= St. Stephen's Cathedral, Vienna =

St. Stephen's Cathedral
- Cathedral and Metropolitan Church of Saint Stephen and All Saints
- Stephansdom (German), Dom- und Metropolitankirche zu Sankt Stephan und allen Heiligen (German)
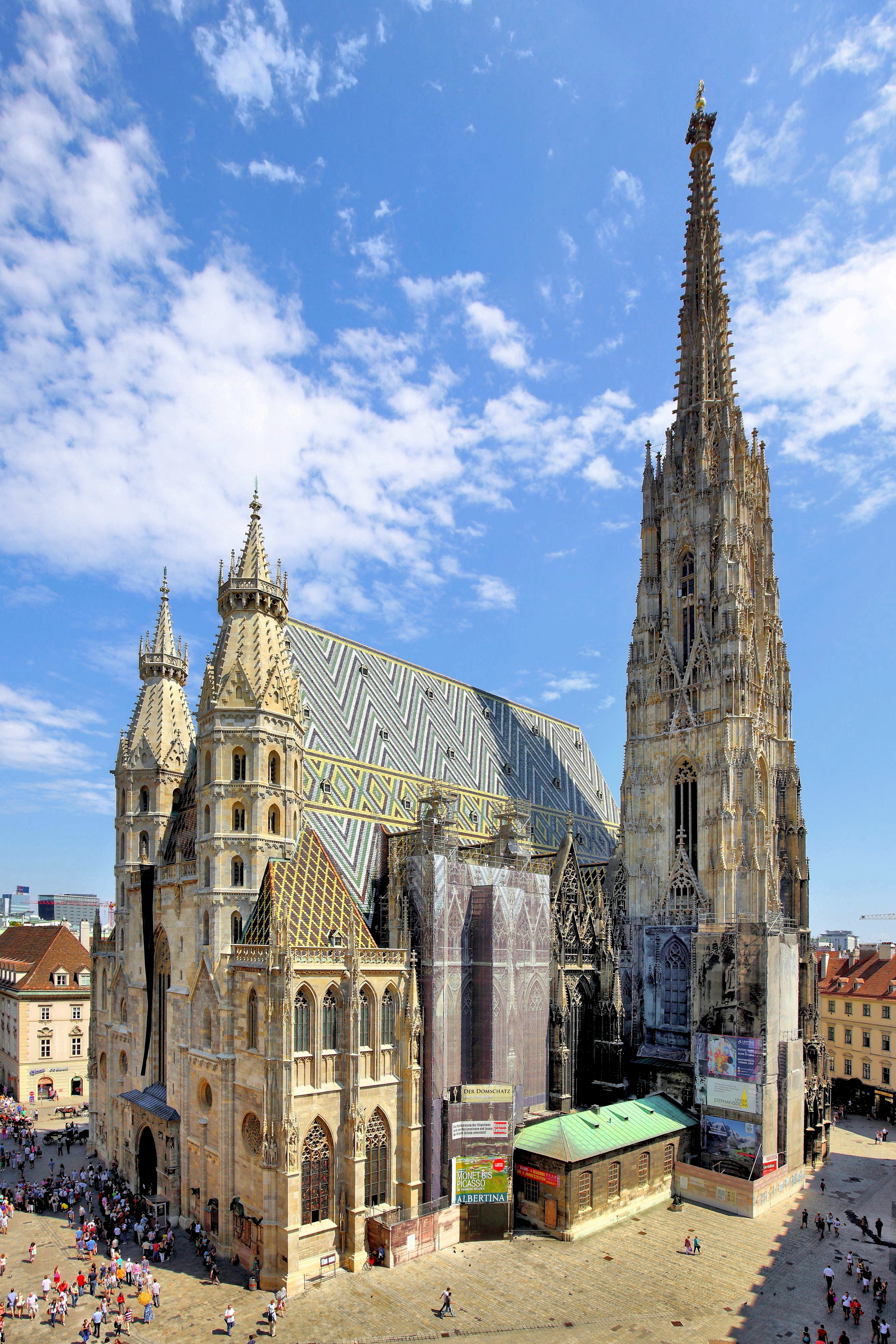
- St. Stephen's Cathedral
- 48.2085°N 16.373°E
- Location: Vienna
- Country: Austria
- Denomination: Roman Catholic
- Website: stephanskirche.at

History
- Status: Cathedral (also parish church)

Architecture
- Functional status: Active
- Style: Romanesque, Gothic
- Groundbreaking: 1137
- Completed: 1578

Specifications
- Length: 107 metres (351 ft)
- Width: 70 metres (230 ft)
- Height: 136.7 metres (448 ft)
- Materials: limestone

Administration
- Archdiocese: Vienna

Clergy
- Archbishop: Josef Grünwidl

St. Stephen's Cathedral (German: Domkirche St. Stephan [ˈdɔmˌkɪʁçə ˈzaŋkt ˈʃ͡tɛfan] also known as Stephansdom German pronunciation: [ˈʃ͡tɛfansˌdoːm]) is a Roman Catholic church in Vienna, Austria, and the mother church of the Archdiocese of Vienna. It is the seat of the Archbishop of Vienna, Josef Grünwidl.

The current Romanesque and Gothic form of the cathedral, seen today in the Stephansplatz, was largely initiated by Duke Rudolf IV (1339–1365) and stands on the ruins of two earlier churches, the first a parish church consecrated in 1147. The most important religious building in Vienna, St. Stephen's Cathedral has borne witness to many important events in Habsburg and Austrian history and has, with its multi-coloured tile roof, become one of the city's most recognizable symbols. It has 256 stairs from the top to the bottom

== History ==
By the middle of the 12th century, Vienna had become an important municipal centre, and the four existing churches, including only one parish church, no longer met the town's religious needs. In 1137, Bishop of Passau Reginmar and Margrave Leopold IV signed the Treaty of Mautern, which referred to Vienna as a civitas for the first time and transferred St. Peter's Church to the Diocese of Passau. Under the treaty, Margrave Leopold IV also received from the bishop extended stretches of land beyond the city walls, with the notable exception of the territory allocated for the new parish church, which would eventually become St. Stephen's Cathedral. Although previously believed built in an open field outside the city walls, the new parish church was in actuality likely built on an ancient cemetery dating to Ancient Roman times; excavations for a heating system in 2000 revealed graves 2.5 metres (8.2 ft) below the surface, which were carbon-dated to the 4th century. This discovery suggests that an even older religious building on this site predated the St. Rupert's Church, which is considered the oldest church in Vienna.

Growth of the cathedral, showing the Roman towers and Giant's Door from the burned first church (1137), the Romanesque second church (1263), the Gothic Albertine Choir (1340), and the Duke Rudolf IV additions (1359), which removed the second church, leaving Stephansdom as it appears today.

Founded in 1137 following the Treaty of Mautern, the partially constructed Romanesque church was solemnly dedicated in 1147 to Saint Stephen in the presence of Conrad III of Germany, Bishop Otto of Freising, and other German nobles who were about to embark on the Second Crusade. Although the first structure was completed in 1160, major reconstruction and expansion lasted until 1511, and repair and restoration projects continue to the present day. From 1230 to 1245, the initial Romanesque structure was extended westward; the present-day west wall and Romanesque towers date from this period. In 1258, however, a great fire destroyed much of the original building, and a larger replacement structure, also Romanesque in style and reusing the two towers, was constructed over the ruins of the old church and consecrated 23 April 1263. The anniversary of this second consecration is commemorated each year by a rare ringing of the Pummerin bell for three minutes in the evening.

In 1304, King Albert I ordered a Gothic three-nave choir to be constructed east of the church, wide enough to meet the tips of the old transepts. Under his son Duke Albert II, work continued on the Albertine choir, which was consecrated in 1340 on the 77th anniversary of the previous consecration. The middle nave is largely dedicated to St. Stephen and All Saints, while the north and south nave, are dedicated to St. Mary and the Apostles respectively. Duke Rudolf IV, the Founder, Albert II's son, expanded the choir again to increase the religious clout of Vienna. On 7 April 1359, Rudolf IV laid the cornerstone for a westward Gothic extension of the Albertine choir in the vicinity of the present south tower. This expansion would eventually encapsulate the entirety of the old church, and in 1430, the edifice of the old church was removed from within as work progressed on the new cathedral. The south tower was completed in 1433, and vaulting of the nave took place from 1446 to 1474. The foundation for a north tower was laid in 1450, and construction began under master Lorenz Spenning, but its construction was abandoned when major work on the cathedral ceased in 1511.

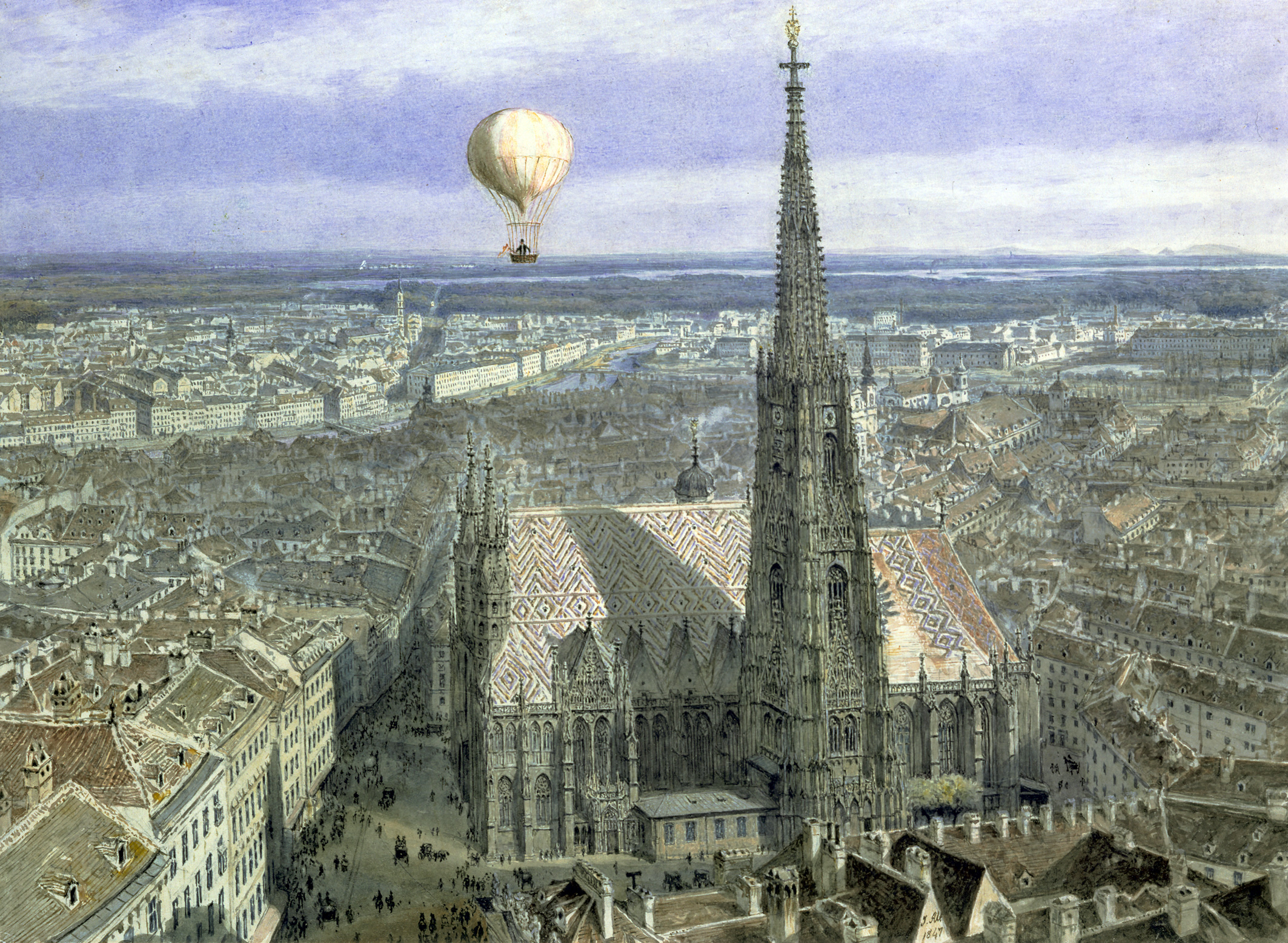
Watercolor by Jakob Alt, 1847

In 1365, just six years after beginning the Gothic extension of the Albertine choir, Rudolf IV disregarded St. Stephen's status as a mere parish church and presumptuously established a chapter of canons befitting a large cathedral. This move was only the first step in fulfilling Vienna's long-held desire to obtain its own diocese; in 1469, Emperor Frederick III prevailed upon Pope Paul II to grant Vienna its own bishop, to be appointed by the emperor. Despite long-standing resistance by the Bishops of Passau, who did not wish to lose control of the area, the Diocese of Vienna was canonically established on 18 January 1469, with St. Stephen's Cathedral as its mother church. In 1722 during the reign of Emperor Charles VI, Pope Innocent XIII elevated the see to an archbishopric.

During World War II, the cathedral was saved from intentional destruction at the hands of retreating German forces when Wehrmacht Captain Gerhard Klinkicht disregarded orders from the city commandant, "Sepp" Dietrich, to "fire a hundred shells and reduce it to rubble". On 12 April 1945, civilian looters lit fires in nearby shops as Soviet Army troops entered the city. The winds carried the fire to the cathedral, where it severely damaged the roof, causing it to collapse. Fortunately, protective brick shells built around the pulpit, Frederick III's tomb, and other treasures, minimized damage to the most valuable artworks. However, the Rollinger choir stalls, carved in 1487, could not be saved. Reconstruction began immediately after the war, with a limited reopening 12 December 1948 and a full reopening 23 April 1952.

== Exterior ==
The church was dedicated to St. Stephen, also the patron of the bishop's cathedral in Passau, and so was oriented toward the sunrise on his feast day of 26 December, as the position stood in the year that construction began. Built of limestone, the cathedral is 107 metres (351 ft) long, 40 metres (130 ft) wide, and 136 metres (446 ft) tall at its highest point. Over the centuries, soot and other forms of air pollution accumulating on the church have given it a black colour, but recent restoration projects have again returned some portions of the building to their original white.

=== Towers ===
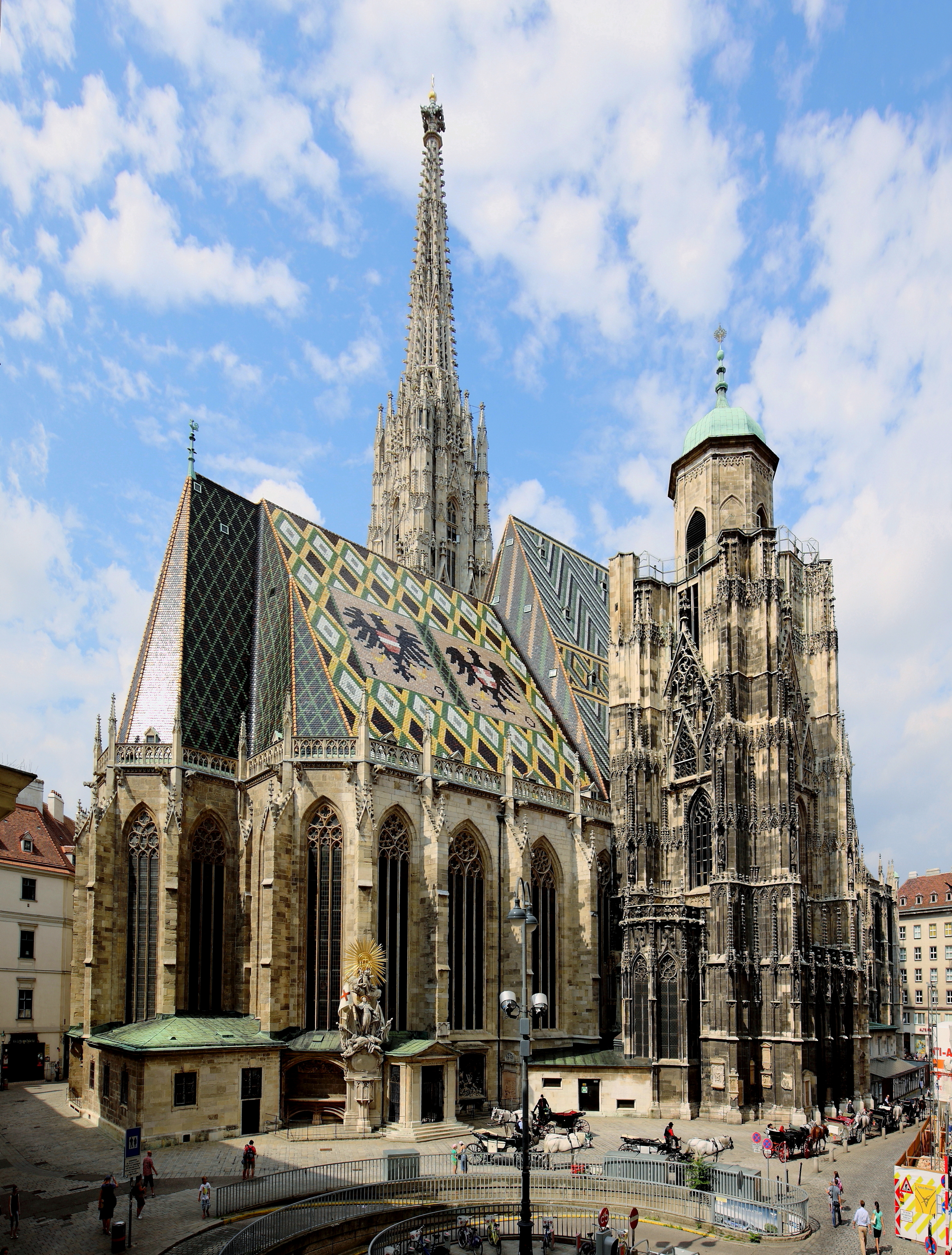
South tower and the shorter north tower, along with the roof tiles mosaic.

Standing at 136 meters (446 ft) tall and affectionately referred to by the city's inhabitants as "Steffl" (a diminutive form of "Stephen"), St. Stephen's Cathedral's massive south tower is its highest point and a dominant feature of the Vienna skyline. Its construction lasted 65 years, from 1368 to 1433. During the Siege of Vienna in 1529 and again during the Battle of Vienna in 1683, it served as the main observation and command post for the defence of the walled city, and it even contains an apartment for the watchmen who, until 1955, manned the tower at night and rang the bells if a fire was spotted in the city. At the tip of the tower stands the double-eagle imperial emblem with the Habsburg-Lorraine coat of arms on its chest, surmounted by a double-armed apostolic cross, which refers to Apostolic Majesty, the imperial style of kings of Hungary. This emblem replaced earlier crescent and the six-pointed star emblem. The original emblem, as well as a couple of later ones, today can be seen at the Vienna City Museum.

The north tower was originally intended to mirror the south tower, but the design proved too ambitious, considering the era of Gothic cathedrals was nearing its end, and construction was halted in 1511. In 1578, the tower-stump was augmented with a Renaissance cap, nicknamed the "water tower top" by the Viennese. The tower now stands at 68 metres (223 ft) tall, roughly half the height of the south tower.

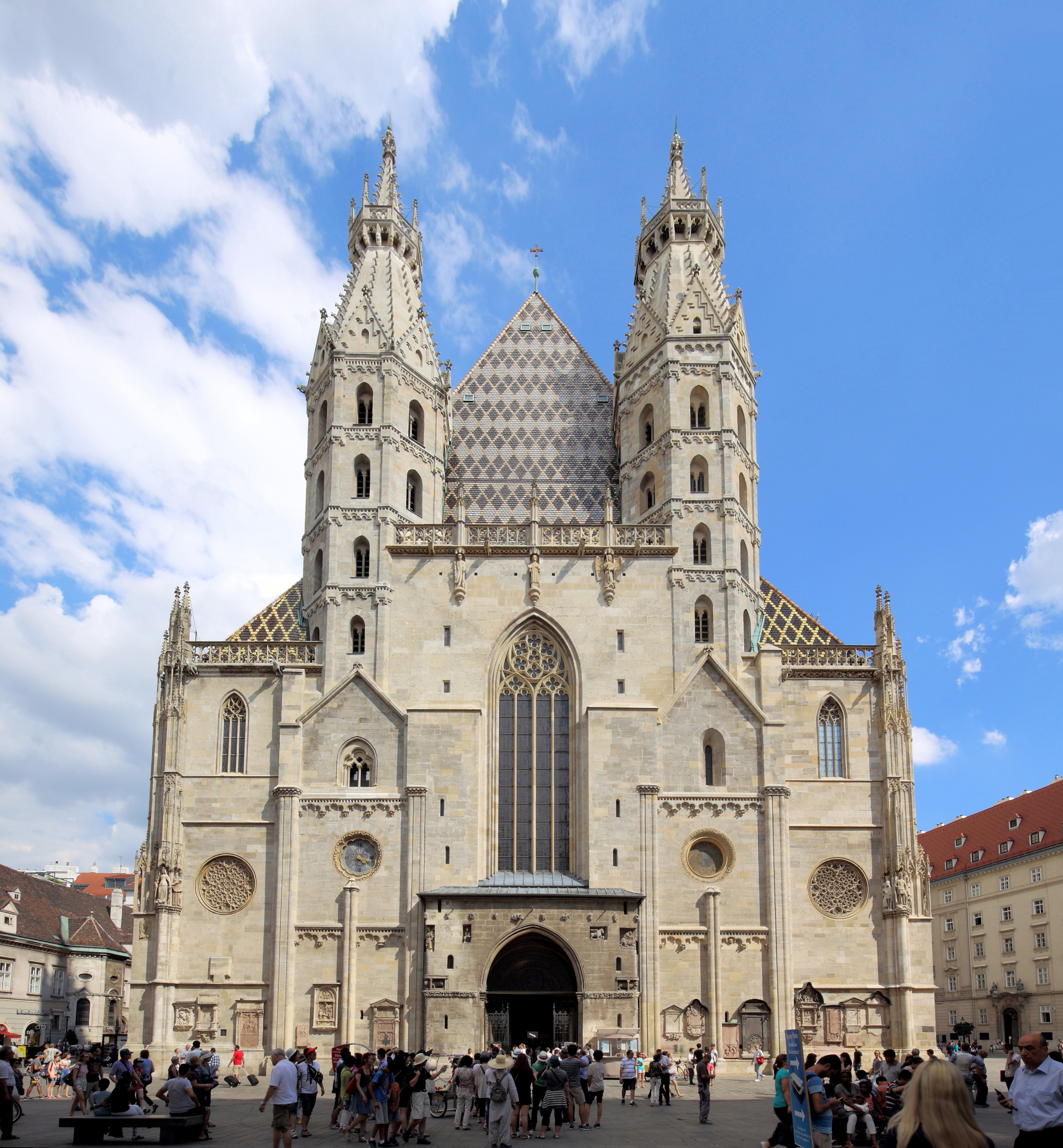
Romanesque Towers on the west front, with the Giant's Door

The main entrance to the church is named the Giant's Door, or Riesentor, possibly referring to the thighbone of a mammoth that hung over it for decades after being unearthed in 1443 while digging the foundations for the north tower, or else to the funnel shape of the door, from the Middle High German word risen, meaning 'sink or 'fall'. The tympanum above the Giant's Door depicts Christ Pantocrator flanked by two winged angels, while on the left and right are the two Roman Towers, or Heidentürme, that each stand at approximately 65 metres (213 ft) tall. The name for the towers derives from the fact that they were constructed from the rubble of old structures built by the Romans (German Heiden meaning heathens or pagans) during their occupation of the area. Square at the base and octagonal above the roofline, the Heidentürme originally housed bells; those in the south tower were lost during World War II, but the north tower remains an operational bell tower. The Roman Towers, together with the Giant's Door, are the oldest parts of the church.

=== Roof ===
The glory of St. Stephen's Cathedral is its ornately patterned, richly coloured roof, 111 metres (364 ft) long, and covered by 230,000 glazed tiles. Above the choir on the south side of the building the tiles form a mosaic of the double-headed eagle that is symbolic of the empire ruled from Vienna by the Habsburg dynasty. On the north side, the coats of arms of the City of Vienna and of the Republic of Austria are depicted. In 1945, fire caused by World War II damage to nearby buildings leapt to the north tower of the cathedral and destroyed the wooden framework of the roof. Replicating the original bracing for so large a roof (it rises 38 metres above the floor) would have been cost-prohibitive, so over 600 metric tons of steel bracing were used instead. The roof is so steep that it is sufficiently cleaned by the rain alone and is seldom covered by snow.

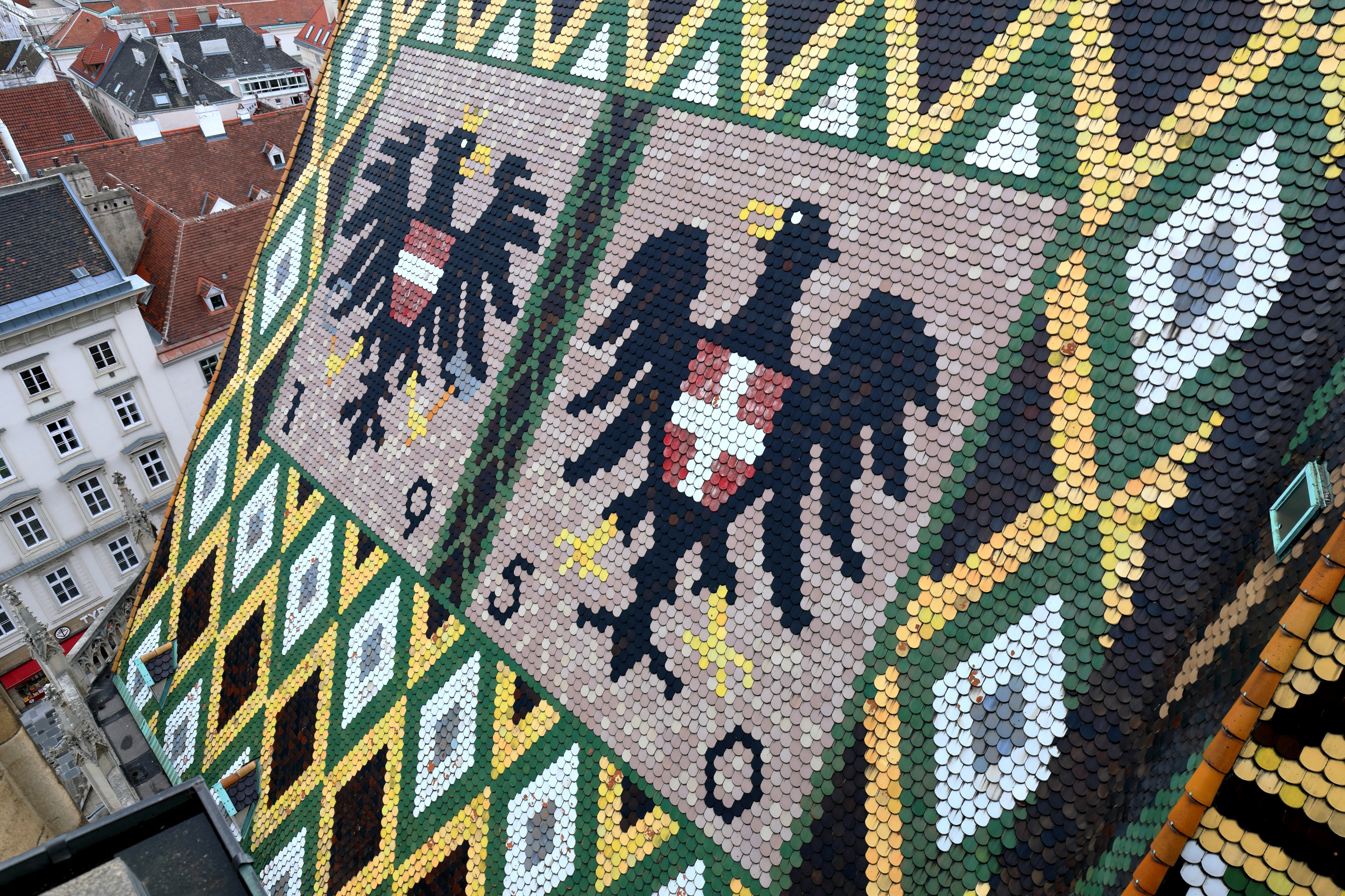
St. Stephen's Cathedral roof

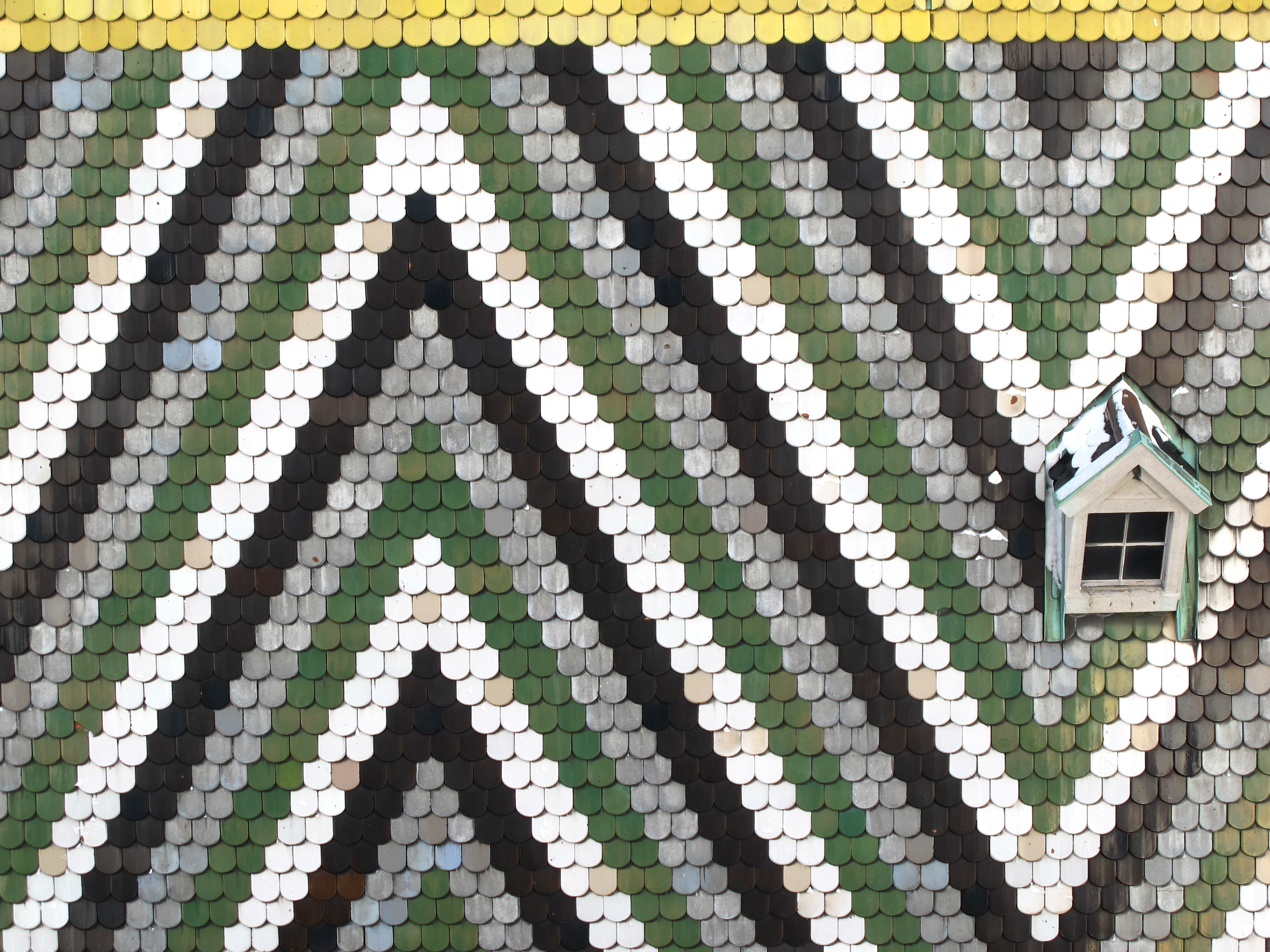
Window on the Stephansdom roof

== Bells ==
St. Stephen's Cathedral currently has a total of 22 bells in four separate belfries.

Bell Number	Name (German)	Name (English)	Weight (kg)	Tower
1	Pummerin/Marienglocke (Bourdon Bell)	Boomer/St. Mary	20.130	North
2	Halbpummerin/Stephanusglocke (2nd Bourdon Bell)	Half Boomer/Saint Stephen	5.221,5	South
3	Leopoldsglocke	St. Leopold	2.193	South
4	Christophorusglocke	St. Christopher	1.286	South
5	Leonhardsglocke	St. Leonhard	956	South
6	Josefsglocke	St. Joseph	593	South
7	Petrus-Canisius-Glocke	St. Peter Canisius	388	South
8	Pius-X.-Glocke	St. Pius X	266,9	South
9	Allerheiligenglocke	All Saints	261,4	South
10	Clemens-Maria-Hofbauer-Glocke	St. Clement Maria Hofbauer	108,9	South
11	Erzengel-Michael-Glocke	St. Michael	63,9	South
12	Tarzisiusglocke	St. Tarsicius	44,4	South
13	Feuerin	Fire bell	1750	North romanesque
14	Kantnerin	Cantor bell	1250	North romanesque
15	Fehringerin	?	750	North romanesque
16	Bieringerin	Beer ringer	530	North romanesque
17	Churpötsch	Maria Pötsch	290	North romanesque
18	Zügenglocke	The deathbed	158	North romanesque
19	Chorglöckl	Choir bell	212	North romanesque
20	Speisglocke	Communion bell	237	Spire
21	Uhrschelle	Hour bell	1500	Spire
22	Primglocke	Quarter bell	140	Spire

=== Pummerin ===
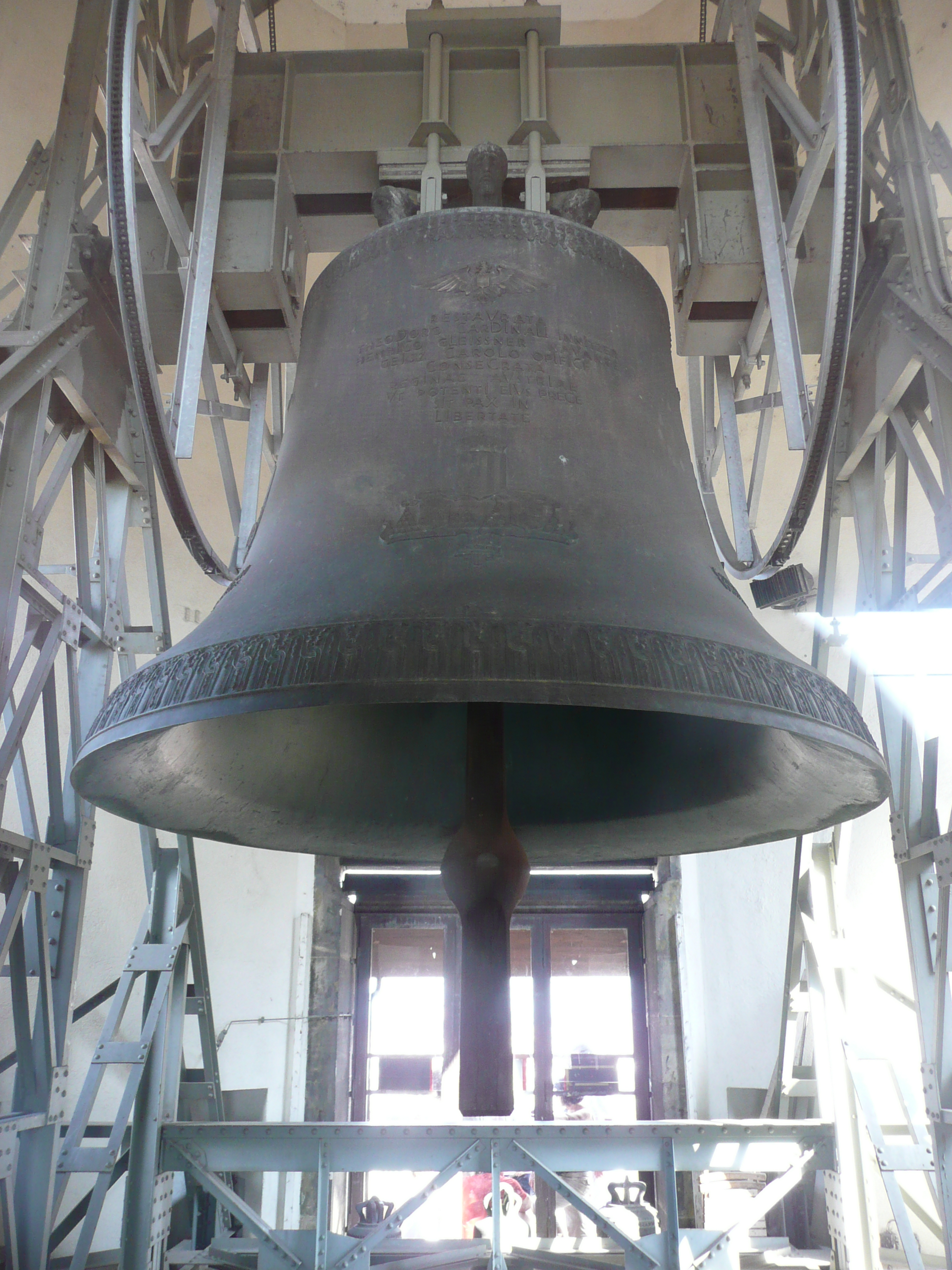
The bourdon bell of the cathedral: The Pummerin

Pummerin's sound

Mounted 20 metres (66 ft) above the street level in the north tower, the bourdon bell of the cathedral is officially named Marienglocke, after St. Mary, but it is locally referred to as Pummerin (literally, "Boomer") for its immersive tonal quality. It weighs in at 20,130 kilograms (44,380 lb) and has a diameter of 3.14 metres (10.3 ft) at its mouth, making it the largest bell in Austria, as well as the third largest swinging bell in Europe. (Note: Ranking behind Petersglocke of the Cologne Cathedral in Germany, and the great bell of the People's Salvation Cathedral in Romania.) It was cast in 1951 after World War II at St. Florian, Upper Austria, and delivered to the cathedral as a gift from the provincial government. Pummerin usually sounds on special occasions, including Easter, Pentecost, the Feast of Corpus Christi, Christmas Eve, Saint Stephen's Day, and New Year's Day.

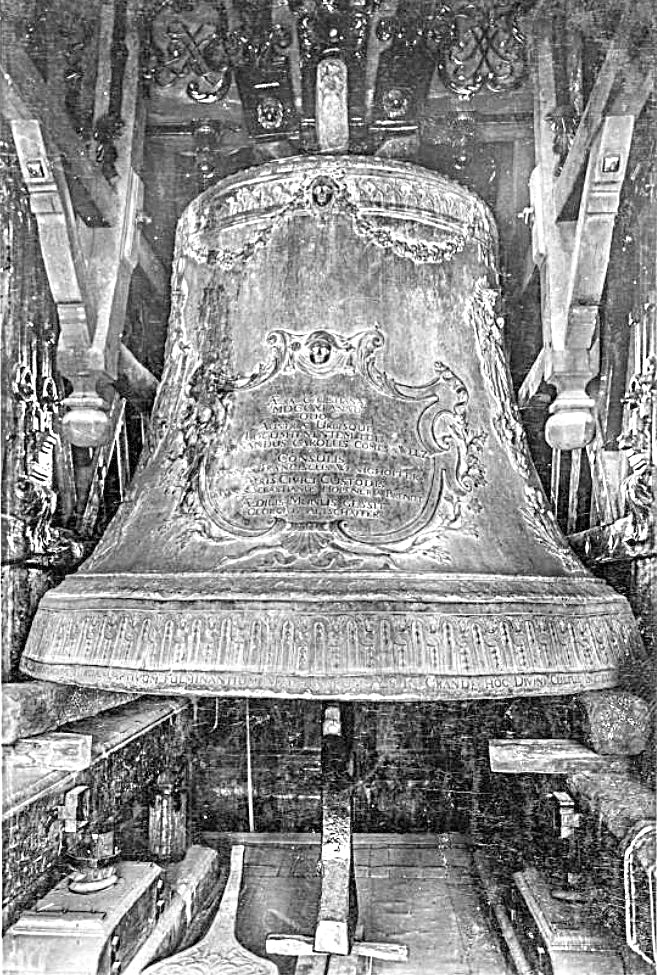
The old Pummerin, known as the Josefinische-glocke

Pummerin is in fact a replacement of an original bell, Josephinische Glocke, named after St. Joseph, colloquially known as "Old Pummerin". Created in 1705 under the auspices of founder Johann Achamer, the old bell hung in the south tower and was slightly larger than the current bell, weighing a few extra tons and having a lower pitch. It was composed partially of material from nearly 300 cannons seized during an unsuccessful Ottoman uprising on the city in the late 1600s. A unique feature for the bell was a pair of thick oak slats forming a cradle on which the bell sat on. When it was time to ring the bell, the cradle would be lowered via jackscrews, and eight men would pull the hefty clapper back and forth on ropes. This method of ringing was recommended by architect Friedrich von Schmidt, who was concerned that the tower's structure was too fragile to withstand the forces induced by swinging the bell itself, however, an ORF clip from the 1930s showed the bell swinging back and forth. The bell was resting on the cradle as the fire of 1945 overtook the belfry. The burning cradle ultimately gave out, and the bell crashed through multiple floors, and shattered once it hit the bottom. The shattered pieces were salvaged and mixed in with the metal that was used to cast today's Pummerin that was put into service in 1957.

=== Bells in the North tower ===
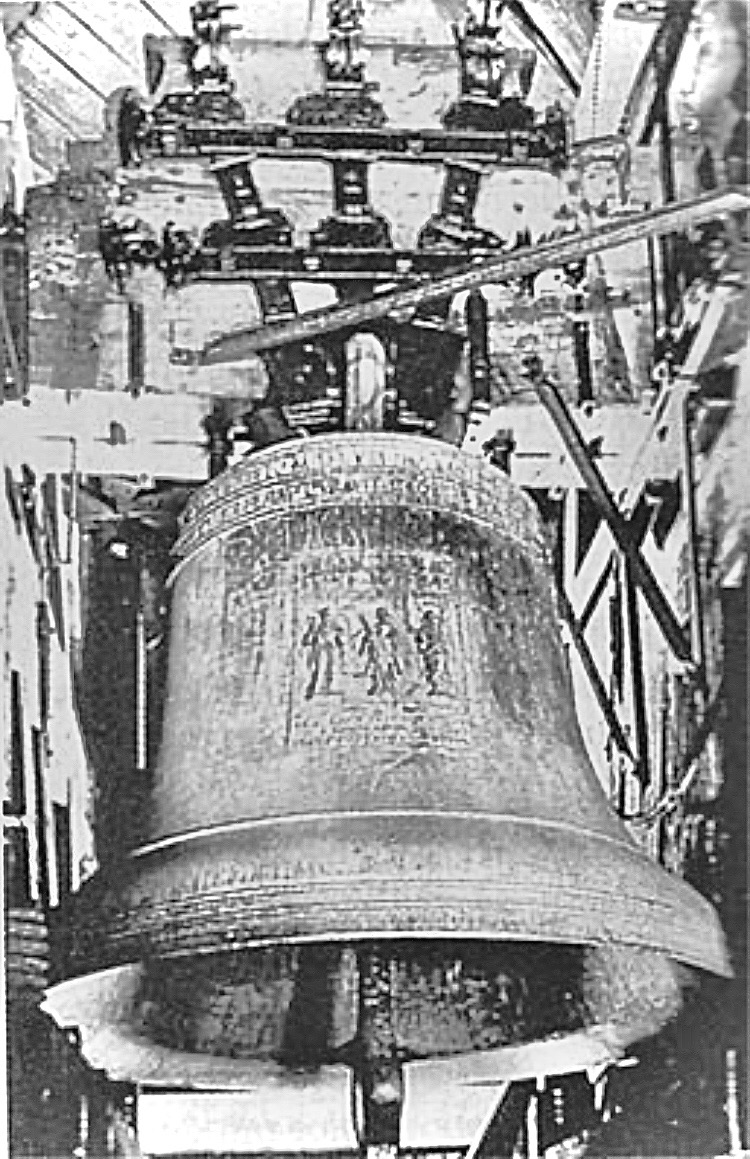
The Johannesglocke/Halbpummerin, cast in 1558 and destroyed in 1945

In addition to Pummerin, the north tower temporarily housed three historic bells:

- Speisglocke ("communion bell"), weighing 240 kilograms (530 lb), c. 1746.
- Chorglöckl ("choir bell"), weighing 212 kilograms (467 lb), c. approximately 1280.
- Zügenglocke ("processions bell"), weighing 65 kilograms (143 lb), c. 1830.

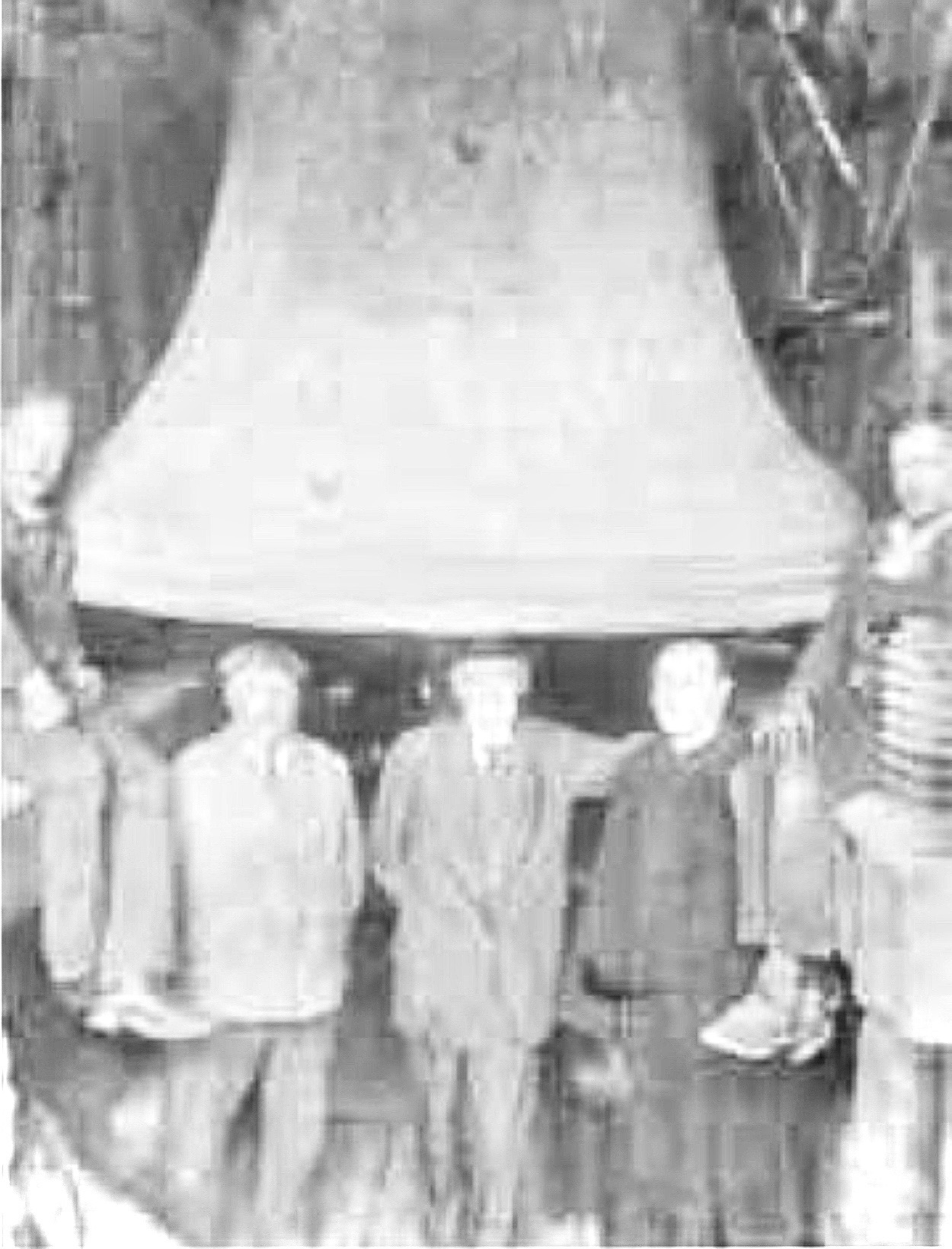
The Johannesglocke/Halbpummerin, shortly after the electric swinging system was installed, 1925

The Speisglocke and Zügenglocke were originally hung in the spire in the South tower with the clock bells. At one point, these bells including the Chorglöckl, were planned to be melted down, and their precious bronze confiscated as raw material for war efforts in 1940. However, the Zügenglocke and Chorglöckl were each moved and resuspended in the northern Romanesque tower following an extensive restoration project. In early 2026, the Speisglocke was reinstalled in the spire of the South tower, where it previously hung beforehand, after being extensively repaired by the Grassmayr bell foundry in Innsbruck, as when the bell was transported away in 1940, the bell was heavily damaged

Before the fire in 1945, the north tower housed an older bell, known as Johannesglocke ("St. John’s Bell"), cast in 1558 by Urban Weiß (a recast of a bell from the 1470s). This was also called the Halbpummerin (English, "Half Pummerin"). The Johannesglocke was actually the very first iteration of the Pummerin, until a larger version (the Josefinische-glocke) was cast in 1705, turning this bell into the Half Pummerin. This bell hung in the octagonal chamber, in the exact spot where the current Pummerin hangs. The Halbpummerin had a strike tone of E^{0}, and in terms of sound quality, was said to have been much nicer than the Gloriosa of Erfurt cathedral. In 1925, the bell was given an electrical swinging system, so it wouldn't require several men to ring. Unfortunately, this bell did not survive the devastating fire, as it too, crashed to the ground. The Halbpummerin had an estimated weight of roughly 11,878 kg. This bell's clapper currently sits under the framework of the current Pummerin, and can be seen from one of the sound windows. Some interesting facts about this bell, are its many relations to the Gloriosa of Erfurt. Gloriosa was cast an entire century earlier, but it has the exact same diameter (257 cm), same strike tone (E^{0}), and more. Another unique fact, is that the largest bell in Hannover's Marktkirche has a perfectly identical E^{0}, especially within the background tones, so if you still want to hear the Halbpummerin, just visit the Marktkirche in Hannover

=== Bells in the South tower ===
Of the 14 bells in the south tower, eleven are used for traditional pealing. Installed at an elevation of 25 metres (82 ft), the bells were cast in 1960 by the Pfundner Bell Foundry as replacements for the 4 older bells, especially the Josephinische-glocke, lost in the 1945 fire. The largest of these new bells is the replacement Halbpummerin, known as the Stephanusglocke ("Bell of St. Stephan", sharing the cathedral's namesake), and is the cathedral's second bourdon bell after the Pummerin. They are rung in exacting patterns to announce Mass gatherings, feasts and other significant holy events. For example, the Stephanusglocke sounds whenever the archbishop of Vienna is present at the cathedral, just like its predecessor, the Johannesglocke.

On 16 March 2022, the bells erroneously sounded for 20 minutes overnight, beginning at 2:11 a.m. According to priest Toni Faber, it was determined that hackers remotely accessed the computer-automated system that activates the bells. Luckily the Pummerin was not involved.

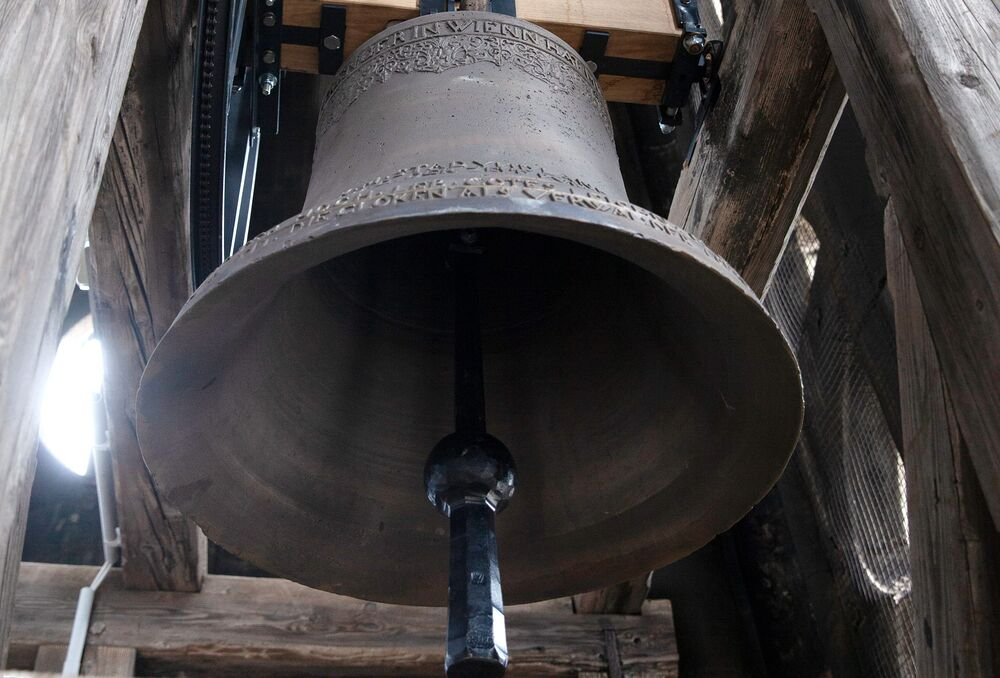
Speisglocke in Stephansdom

The other three bells are mounted 100 metres (330 ft) in the spire. Two of which serve as the cathedral's clock bells. The Primglocke (recast in 1771) chimes the quarter-hour, and the Uhrschälle (c. 1449) strikes the hour on the hour. The third bell is the Speisglocke, which is rung when the communion is brought to a sick, or even a dying person. This bell was reinstalled in late 2025/early 2026, after a restoration from the Grassmayr bell foundry

=== In the Romanesque towers ===
In their prime, the five bells of the northern Romanesque tower were given names based on the civic functions they were devoted for. Nowadays they are used for evening prayers. Two more bells were added later on, raising the count to 7.

Bell Number	Name	Weight (kg)	Diameter (cm)	Bell Founder	Casting Year	Strike Tone	
1	Feuerin	1750	140	Friedrich Gössner	1879	es^{1}(+0)	Feuerin in Stephansdom
2	Kantnerin	1250	129.7	Franz Josef Scheichel	1772	es^{1}(+2)	Kantnerin in Stephansdom
3	Fehringerin	750	111.5	Franz Josef Scheichel	1772	ges^{1}(+4)	Fehringerin in Stephansdom
4	Bieringerin	530	99	Franz Josef Scheichel	1772	as^{1}(+7)	Bieringerin in Stephansdom
5	Churpötsch	290	78.5	Franz Josef Scheichel	1772	c^{2}(+11)	Churpötsch in Stephansdom
6	Zügenglocke	158	65	Bartholomäus Kaffel	1830	es^{2}(-3)	
7	Chorglöckl	212	62	Konrad von München	1280	g^{2}(+8)	Chorglöckl in Stephansdom

Cast in 1879 by Friedrich Gössner, the Feuerin (literally, "fire alarm") rings every Thursday evening to reinvoke the final tragic moments of Christ; it also sounds together with the other bells for the Saturday and Sunday vespers. Likewise on Saturday, the Churpötsch rings after the evening Angelus. It was donated by the local curia in honour of the Maria Pötsch icon. Up until the 18th century, the tolling of the Bieringerin ("beer ringer") signaled the last call at taverns. Cantors are summoned to Mass at the sound of Kantnerin. The Fehringerin, together with Kantnerin and Bieringerin, calls upon the Asperges. These four bells were cast in 1772 by the now-defunct Scheichel Bell Foundry, as recasts of older bells. Feuerin was a recast of an older bell from 1453, Kantnerin from 1552, Bieringerin from 1546 and Zügenglocke from 1707

The bells are located in 3 separate floors of the tower. The lower deck houses the Bieringerin and the Feuerin. The middle deck houses the Chorglöckl, Zügenglocke, Fehringerin and the Kantnerin. The upper deck holds the Churpötsch. To know where the decks sit from the outside, the middle deck sits on the uppermost sound windows (the lower deck is literally just right below those windows), and the upper deck sits just above it. There are some really small windows around the upper deck area. The way to access the tower is rather through catwalks in the cathedral's attic, or the floor of the attic. The romanesque towers are still off limits to the public. The little "crowns" on the top of the towers are actually private viewing decks, which are accessible, via ladders and a little door at the top

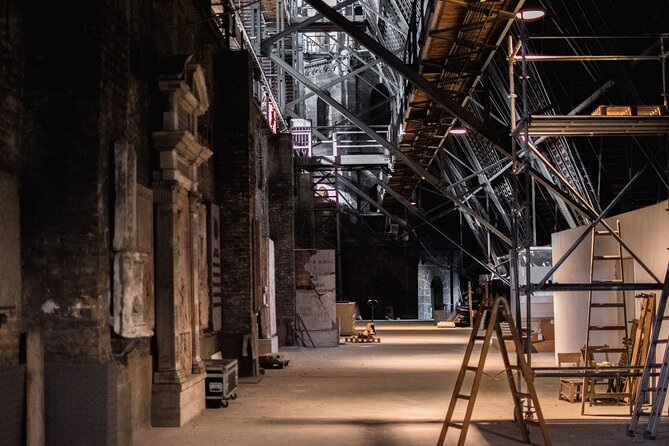
The Nördlichen Heidenturm

In February 2017, the ~1280-made Chorglöckl was added to the northern Romanesque tower belfry after lying in disuse at the main north tower. The oldest in the cathedral, the bell traces back to the great Vienna fire of 1276. It was restored to working order at the Grassmayr Bell Foundry in Innsbruck in 2017. Its clapper, last repaired during the Baroque Period, was found hidden in a niche on the wall of the tower. This bell sounds every Friday, after the evening Angelus, to memorialize all those who died the week before. The Zügenglocke got the same restorative treatment and was transferred from the north tower in 2022. Its chiming encourages final prayers for persons nearing death on their communion.

The south romanesque tower used to house 2 slightly larger bells until the fire:

Bell Number	Name	Nickname	Weight (kg)	Diameter (cm)	Bell Founder	Casting Year	Strike Tone
1	Viertelpummerin	Neuerin	4900	202	Peter Hilzer	1884	A^{0}/Gis^{0}
2	Zwölferin	Fürstenglocke	2350	159	Franz Josef Scheichel	1772	c^{1}

The Zwölferin (twelve bell), or the Fürstenglocke (prince's bell), had its crown removed some time during the 20th century, likely due to metal fatigue/cracking. The Viertelpummerin (quarter pummerin), or the Neuerin (newcomer), was originally cast without a crown. It had a metal disc, similar to the replacement Pfudner bells in the south tower. The reason the bell was known as the Neuerin, was due to the bell being the newest one at the cathedral from 1884 to 1945. The Viertelpummerin was actually a recast of an older version from 1772 by the Scheichel foundry. These romanesque towers were above the organ, allowing the flames to enter a little space below the tower, causing the wooden frame and bell yokes to be engulfed in the flames, causing the bells to eventually fall through the tower's levels and shatter on the ground. As of today, the only thing remaining in the tower is a large steel frame, built after the fire

=== Fixtures on the outside walls ===
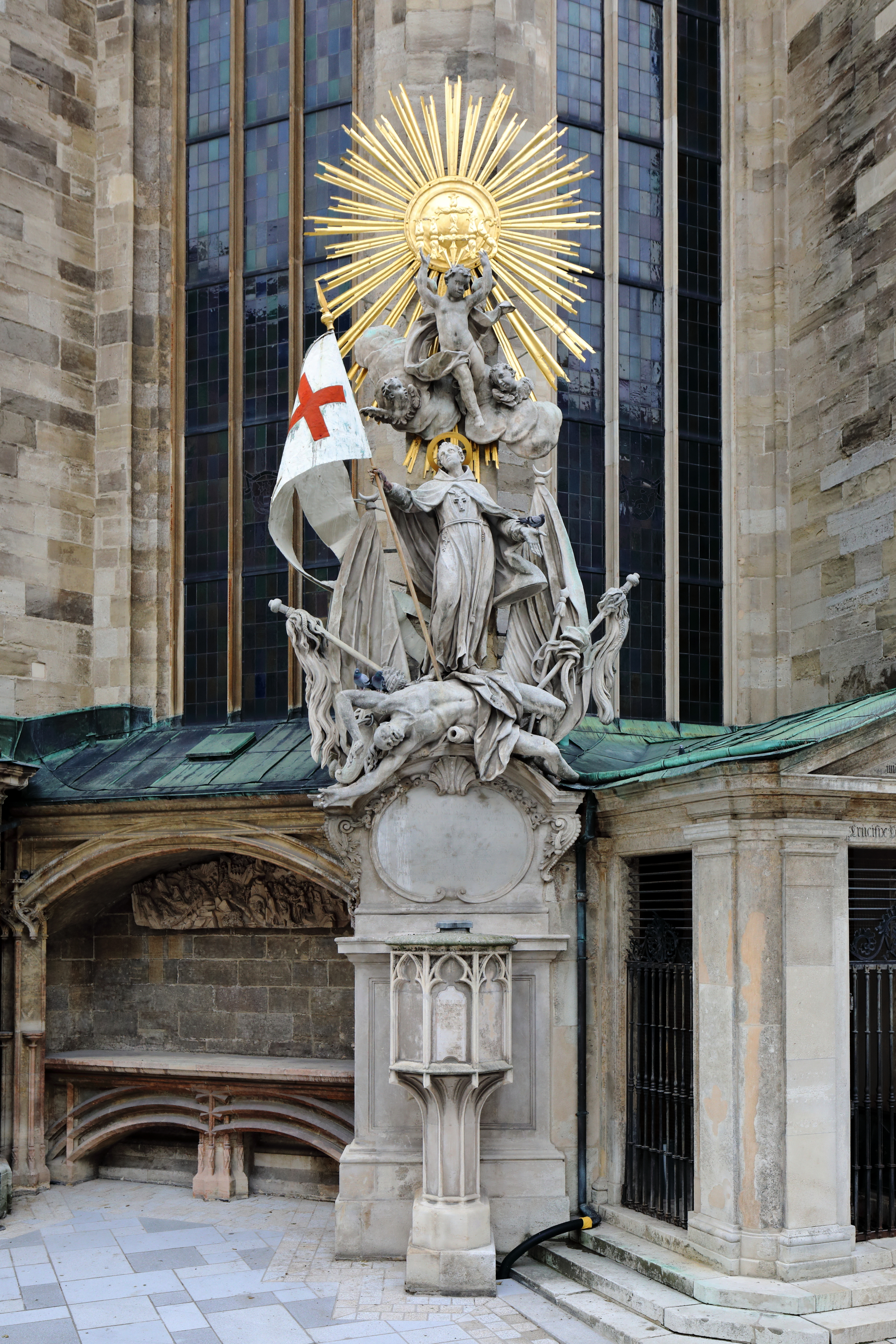
Capistran Chancel

During the Middle Ages, major cities had their own set of measures and the public availability of these standards allowed visiting merchants to comply with local regulations. The official Viennese ell length standards for verifying the measure of different types of cloth sold are embedded in the cathedral wall, to the left of the main entrance. The linen ell, also called Viennese yard, (89.6 centimetres (35.3 in)) and the drapery ell (77.6 centimetres (30.6 in)) length standards consist of two iron bars. According to Franz Twaroch, the ratio between the linen ell and the drapery ell is exactly $\sqrt{3}/2$. The Viennese ells are mentioned for the first time in 1685 by the Canon Testarello della Massa in his book Beschreibung der ansehnlichen und berühmten St. Stephans-Domkirchen.

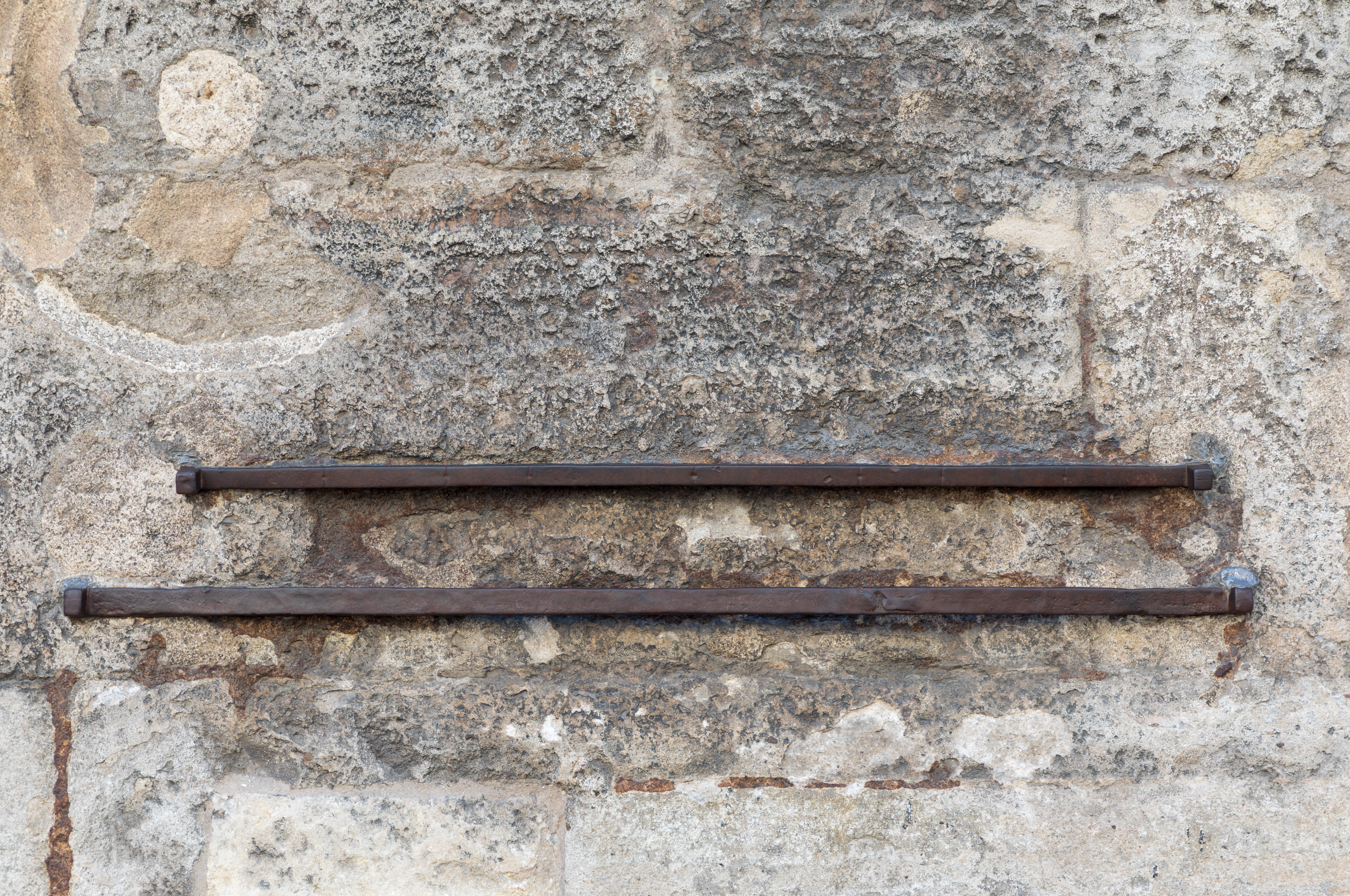
Official Viennese linen ell and drapery ell length standards embedded in the cathedral wall

A memorial tablet (near location SJC on the Plan below) gives a detailed account of Wolfgang Amadeus Mozart's relationship with the cathedral, including the fact that he had been appointed an adjunct music director here shortly before his death. This was his parish church when he lived at the "Figaro House" and he was married here, two of his children were baptised here, and his funeral was held in the Chapel of the Cross (at location PES) inside.

Adjacent to the catacomb entrance is the Capistran Chancel, the pulpit (now outdoors at location SJC) from which St. John Capistrano and Hungarian general John Hunyadi preached a crusade in 1456 to repel Muslim invasions of Christian Europe. (See: Siege of Belgrade). The 18th century Baroque statue shows the Franciscan friar under an extravagant sunburst, trampling on a beaten Turk. This was the original cathedral's main pulpit inside until it was replaced by Niclaes Gerhaert van Leyden's pulpit in 1515.

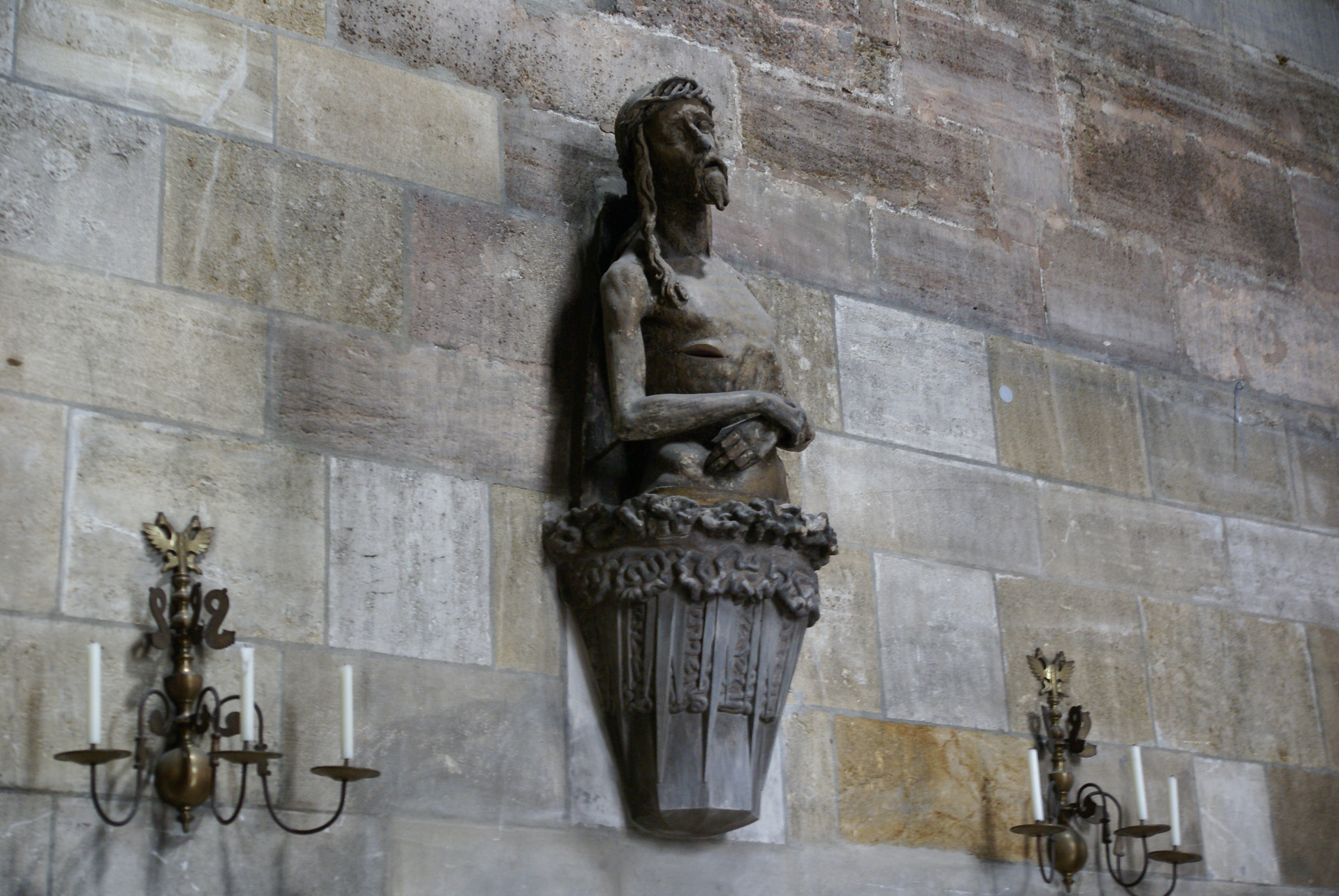
"Christ with a toothache"

A figure of Christ (at location CT) is known affectionately to the Viennese as "Christ with a toothache". At the southwest corner (location S) are various memorials from when the area outside the cathedral was a cemetery, as well as a recently restored 15th-century sundial on a flying buttress.

== Interior ==
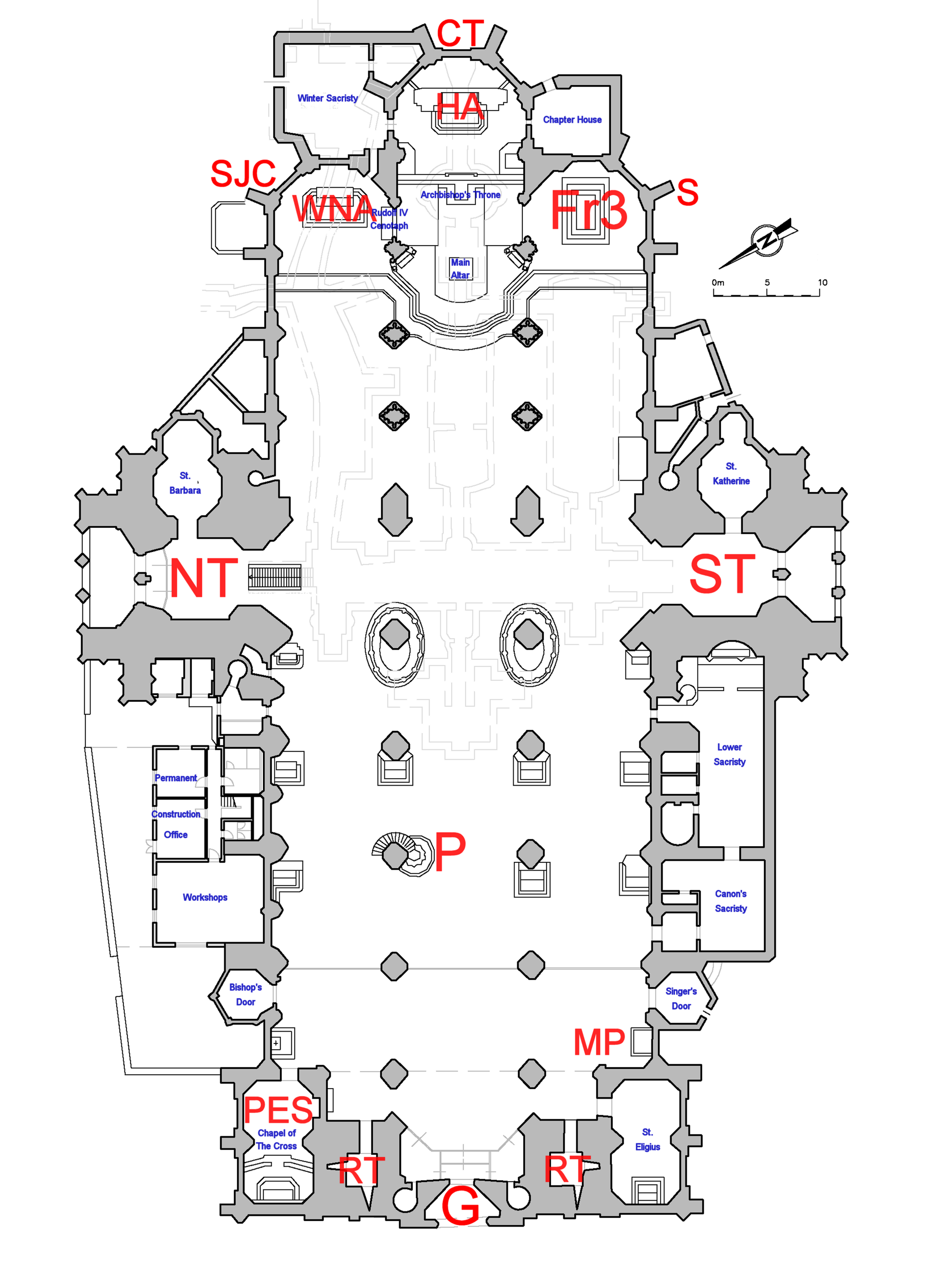
Plan of St. Stephen's Cathedral. CT "Christ with a toothache"; Fr3 Tomb of Emperor Frederick III; G Giant's Door HA High Altar; MP Maria Pötsch icon; NT North Tower; P Pulpit; PES Prince Eugene of Savoy burial chapel; RT Roman Towers; S Sundial; SJC St. John of Capistrano pulpit; ST South Tower; WNA Wiener Neustädter Altar

=== Altars ===
The main part of the church contains 18 altars, with more in the various chapels. The High Altar (HA) and the Wiener Neustadt Altar (German: Wiener Neustädter Altar) (WNA) are the most famous.

The first focal point of any visitor is the distant High Altar, built over seven years from 1641 to 1647 as part of the first refurbishment of the cathedral in the baroque style. The altar was built by Tobias Pock at the direction of Vienna's Bishop Philipp Friedrich Graf Breuner with marble from Poland, Styria and Tyrol. The High Altar represents the stoning of the church's patron St. Stephen. It is framed by figures of patron saints from the surrounding areas – Saints Leopold, Florian, Sebastian and Rochus – and surmounted with a statue of St. Mary which draws the beholder's eye to a glimpse of heaven where Christ waits for Stephen (the first martyr) to ascend from below.

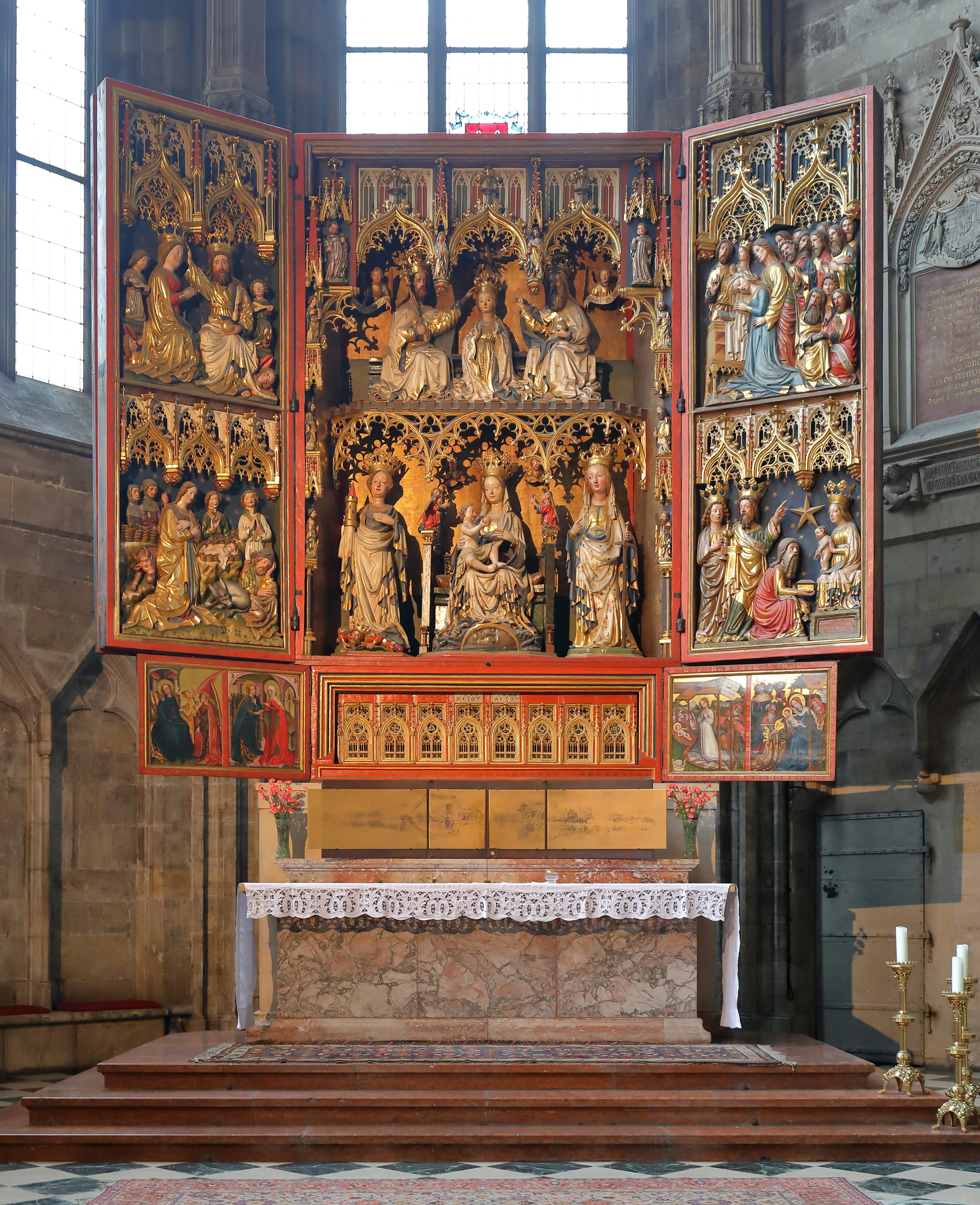
Wiener Neustädter Altar

The Wiener Neustädter Altar at the head of the north nave was ordered in 1447 by Emperor Frederick III, whose tomb is located in the opposite direction. On the predella is his famous A.E.I.O.U. device. Frederick ordered it for the Cistercian Viktring Abbey (near Klagenfurt) where it remained until the abbey was closed in 1786 as part of Emperor Joseph II's anti-clerical reforms. It was then sent to the Cistercian monastery of St. Bernard of Clairvaux (founded by Emperor Frederick III) in the city of Wiener Neustadt, and finally sold in 1885 to St. Stephen's Cathedral when the Wiener Neustadt monastery was closed after merging with Heiligenkreuz Abbey.

The Wiener Neustädter Altar is composed of two triptychs, the upper being four times taller than the lower one. When the lower panels are opened, the Gothic grate of the former reliquary depot above the altar is revealed. On weekdays, the four panels are closed and display a drab painted scene involving 72 saints. On Sundays, the panels are opened showing gilded wooden figures depicting events in the life of the Virgin Mary. Restoration began on its 100th anniversary, in 1985 and took 20 years, 10 art restorers, 40,000 man-hours, and €1.3 million to complete, primarily because its large surface area of 100 square metres (1,100 sq ft).

=== Máriapócs Icon ===
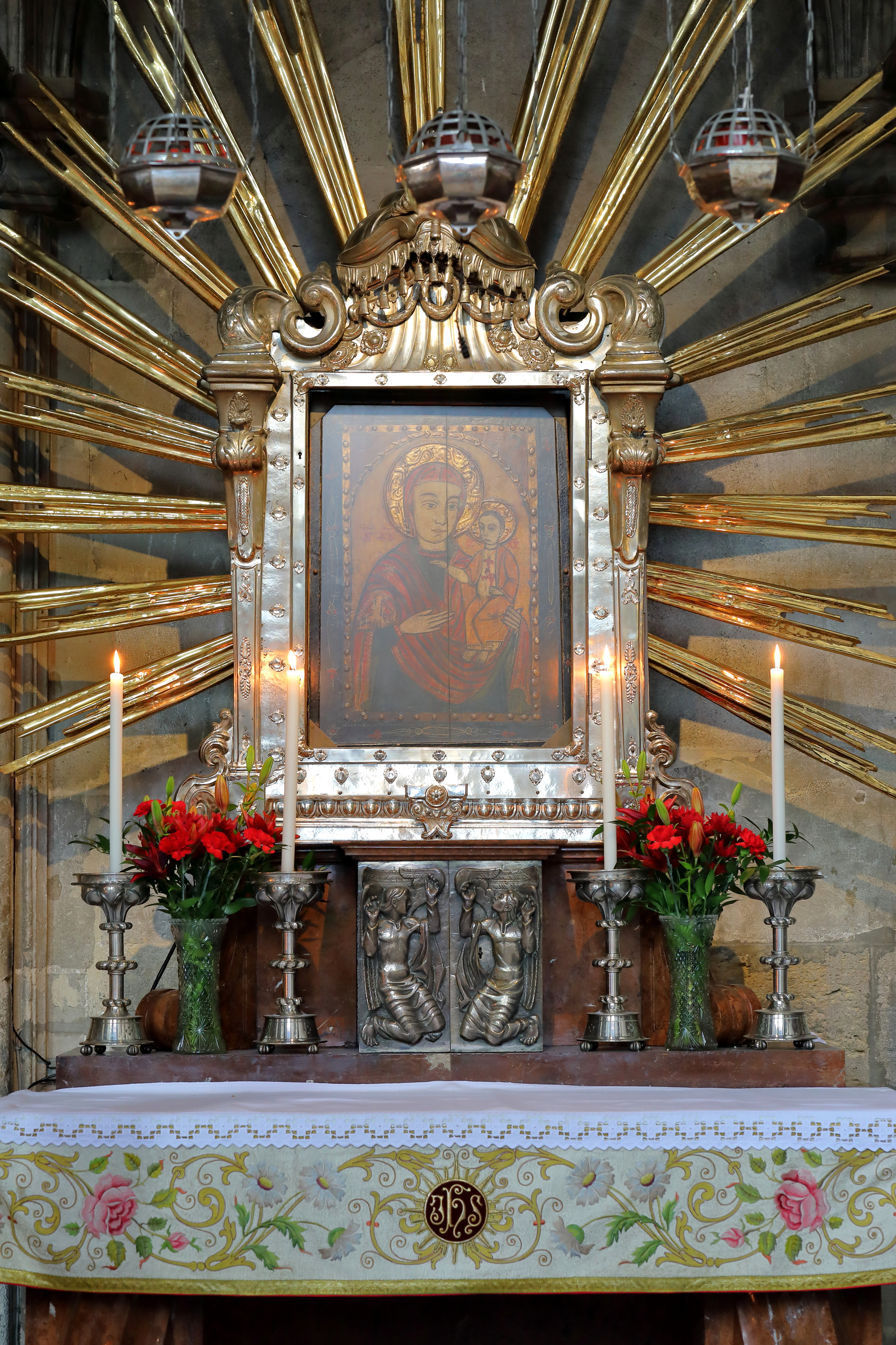
Pötscher Madonna

The Maria Pötsch Icon (MP) is a Byzantine style icon of St. Mary with the child Jesus. The icon takes its name from the Hungarian Byzantine Catholic shrine of Máriapócs (pronounced Poach), whence it was transferred to Vienna. The picture shows the Virgin Mary pointing to the child (signifying "He is the way") and the child holding a three-stemmed rose (symbolizing the Holy Trinity) and wearing a prescient cross from his neck. The 50 x 70 cm icon was commissioned in 1676 from painter István Papp by László Csigri upon his release as a prisoner of war from the Turks who were invading Hungary at the time. As Csigri was unable to pay the 6-forint fee the icon was bought by Lőrinc Hurta who donated it to the church of Pócs.

After claims of two miraculous incidents in 1696 with the mother in the picture allegedly shedding real tears, Emperor Leopold I ordered it brought to St. Stephen's Cathedral, where it would be safe from the Muslim armies that still controlled much of Hungary. Upon its arrival after a triumphal five-month journey in 1697, Empress Eleonora Magdalena commissioned the splendid Rosa Mystica oklad and framework (now one of several) for it, and the Emperor personally ordered the icon placed near the High Altar in the front of the church, where it stood prominently from 1697 until 1945. Since then, it has been in a different framework, above an altar under a medieval stone baldachin near the southwest corner of the nave – where the many burning candles indicate the extent of its veneration, especially by Hungarians. Since its arrival the picture has not been seen weeping again but other miracles and answered prayers have been attributed to it, including Prince Eugene of Savoy's victory over the Turks at Zenta few weeks after the icon's installation in the Stephansdom.

The residents of Pócs wanted their holy miracle-working painting returned, but the emperor sent them a copy instead. Since then, the copy has been reported to weep real tears and work miracles, so the village changed its name from merely Pócs to Máriapócs and has become an important pilgrimage site.

=== Pulpit ===
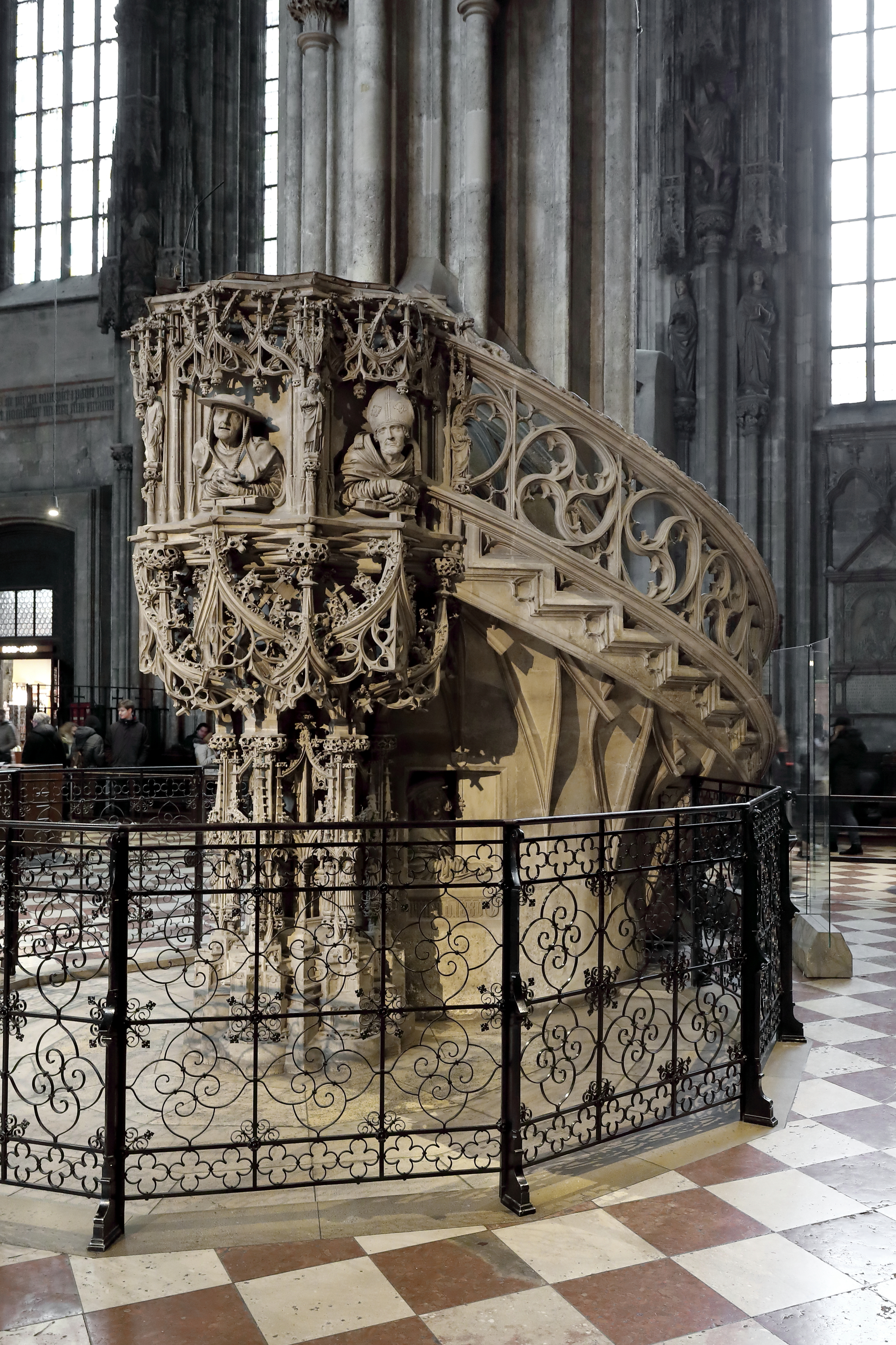
Pulpit

The stone pulpit is a masterwork of late Gothic sculpture. Long attributed to Anton Pilgram, today Niclaes Gerhaert van Leyden is thought more likely to be the carver. So that the local language sermon could be better heard by the worshipers in the days before microphones and loudspeakers, the pulpit stands against a pillar out in the nave, instead of in the chancel at the front of the church.

The sides of the pulpit erupt like stylized petals from the stem supporting it. On those Gothic petals are relief portraits of the four original Doctors of the Church (St. Augustine of Hippo, St. Ambrose, St. Gregory the Great and St. Jerome), each of them in one of four different temperaments and in one of four different stages of life. The handrail of the stairway curving its way around the pillar from ground level to the pulpit has fantastic decorations of toads and lizards biting each other, symbolizing the fight of good against evil. At the top of the stairs, a stone puppy protects the preacher from intruders.

Beneath the stairs is one of the most beloved symbols of the cathedral: a stone self-portrait of the unknown sculptor gawking (German: gucken) out of a window (German: fenster) and thus famously known as the Fenstergucker. The chisel in the subject's hand, and the stonemason's signature mark on the shield above the window led to the speculation that it could be a self-portrait of the sculptor.

=== Chapels ===
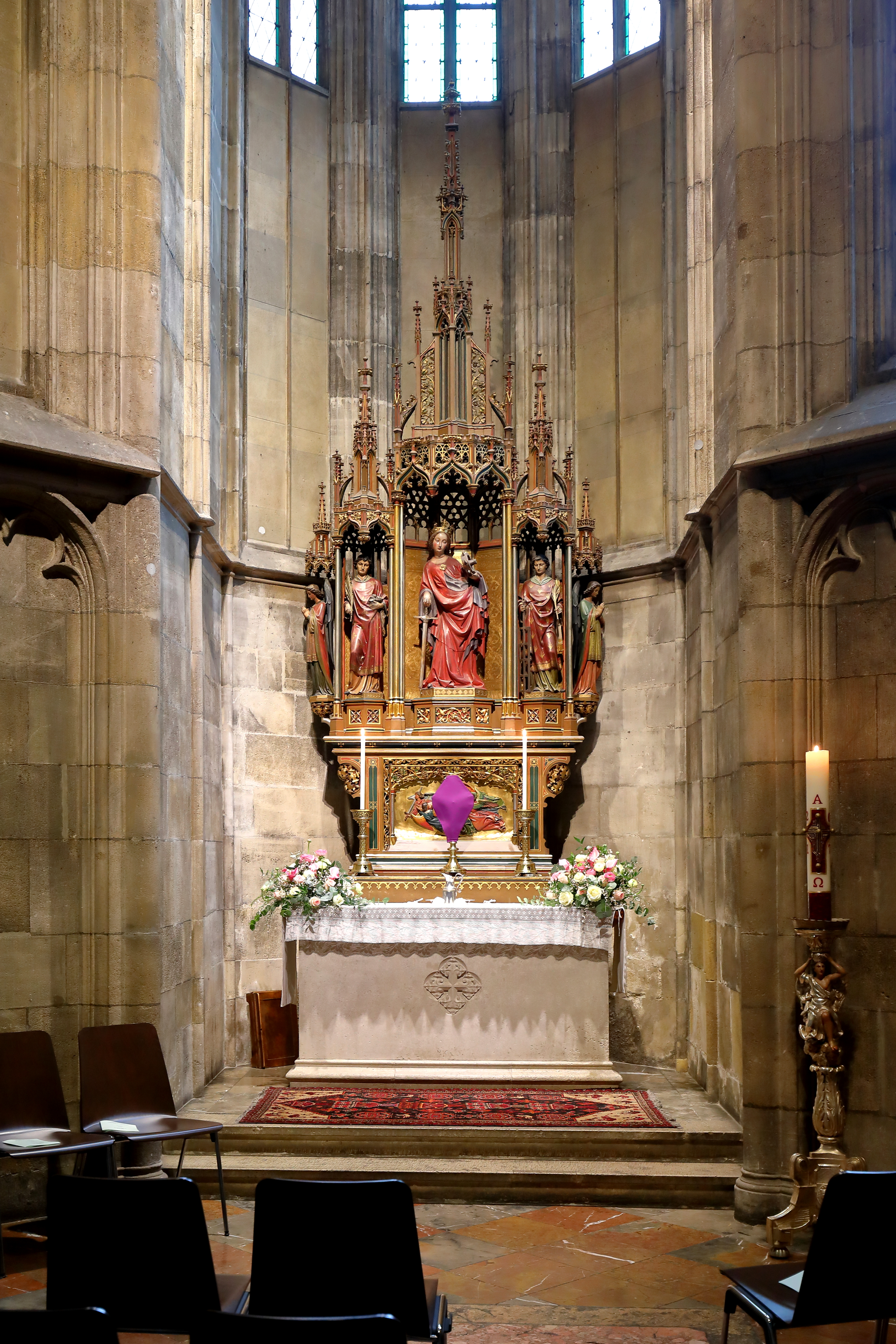
St. Catherine's Chapel

There are several formal chapels in St. Stephen's Cathedral:

- St. Catherine's Chapel, in the base of the south tower, is the baptismal chapel. The 14-sided baptismal font was completed in 1481, and its cover was formerly the soundboard above the famed pulpit in the main church. Its marble base shows the four Evangelists, while the niches of the basin feature the twelve apostles, Christ and St. Stephan.
- St. Barbara's Chapel, in the base of the north tower, is used for meditation and prayer.
- St. Eligius's Chapel, in the southeast corner, is open for prayer. The altar is dedicated to St. Valentine whose body (one of three, held by various churches) is in another chapel, upstairs.
- St. Bartholomew's Chapel, above St. Eligius' Chapel, has recently been restored.
- The Chapel of the Cross (PES), in the northeast corner, holds the burial place of Prince Eugene of Savoy in the vault containing 3 coffins and a heart urn, under a massive stone slab with iron rings. The funeral of Mozart occurred here on 6 December 1791. The beard on the crucified Christ above the altar is of real hair. The chapel is not open to the public.
- St. Valentine's Chapel, above the Chapel of the Cross, is the current depository of the hundreds of relics belonging to the Stephansdom, including a piece of the tablecloth from the Last Supper. A large chest holds the bones of St. Valentine that were moved here about a century ago, from what is now the Chapter House to the south of the High Altar.

=== Tombs, catacombs, and crypts ===
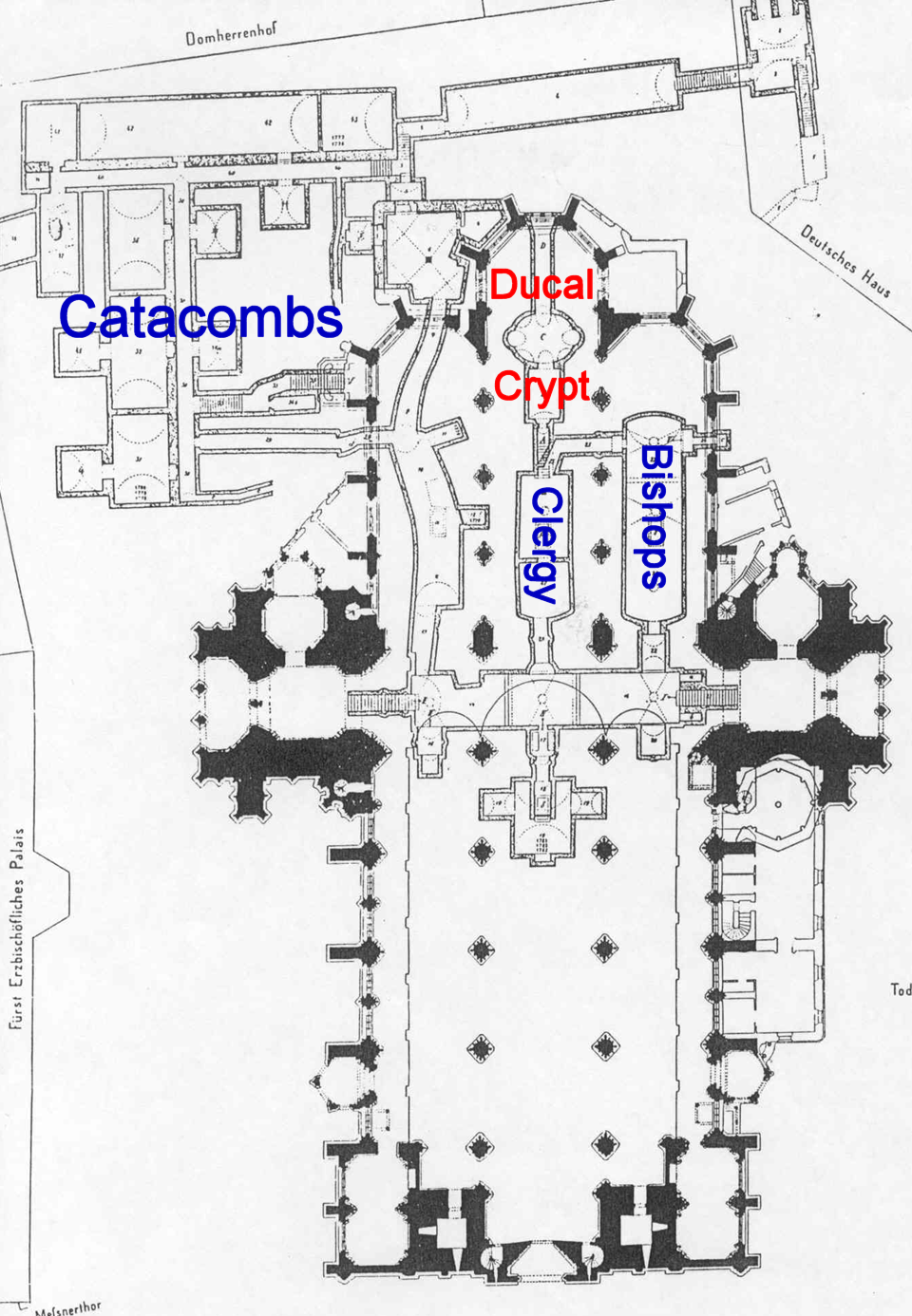
Plan of St. Stephen's Cathedral basement

Since its earliest days, the cathedral has been surrounded by cemeteries dating back to Roman times, and has sheltered the bodies of nobles and commoners. It has always been an honour to be buried inside a church, close to the physical presence of the saints whose relics are preserved there. Those less honoured were buried near, but outside, the church.

Inside the cathedral are the tombs of Prince Eugene of Savoy (PES), commander of the Imperial forces during the War of the Spanish Succession in the Chapel of The Cross (northwest corner of the cathedral) and of Frederick III, Holy Roman Emperor (Fr3), under whose reign the Diocese of Vienna was canonically erected on 18 January 1469, in the Apostles' Choir (southeast corner of the cathedral).

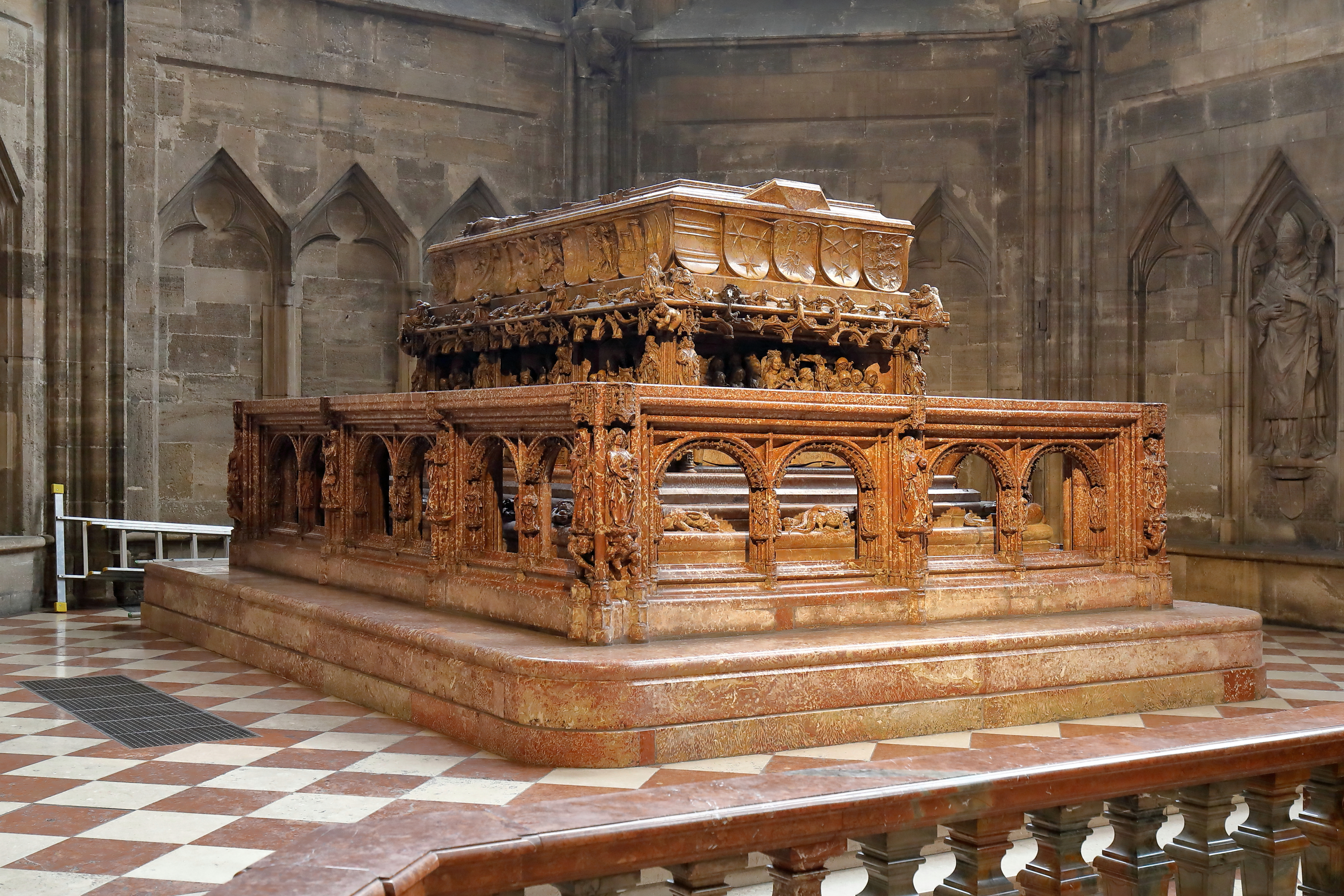
Tomb of Emperor Frederick III

The construction of Emperor Frederick's tomb spanned over 45 years, starting 25 years before his death. The impressive sarcophagus is made of the unusually dense red marble-like stone found at the Adnet quarry. Carved by Niclaes Gerhaert van Leyden, the tomb lid shows Emperor Frederick in his coronation regalia surrounded by the coats of arms of all of his dominions. The body of the tomb has 240 statues and is a glory of medieval sculptural art.

When the charnel house and eight cemeteries abutting the cathedral's side and back walls closed due to an outbreak of bubonic plague in 1735, the bones within them were moved to the catacombs below the church. Burials directly in the catacombs occurred until 1783 when a new law forbade most burials within the city. The remains of over 11,000 persons are in the catacombs (which may be toured).

The basement of the cathedral also hosts the Bishops, Provosts and Ducal crypts. The most recent interment in the Bishop's crypt completed in 1952 under the south choir was that of 98-year-old Cardinal Franz König in 2004. Provosts of the cathedral are buried in another chamber. Other members of the cathedral chapter are now buried in a special section at the Zentralfriedhof.

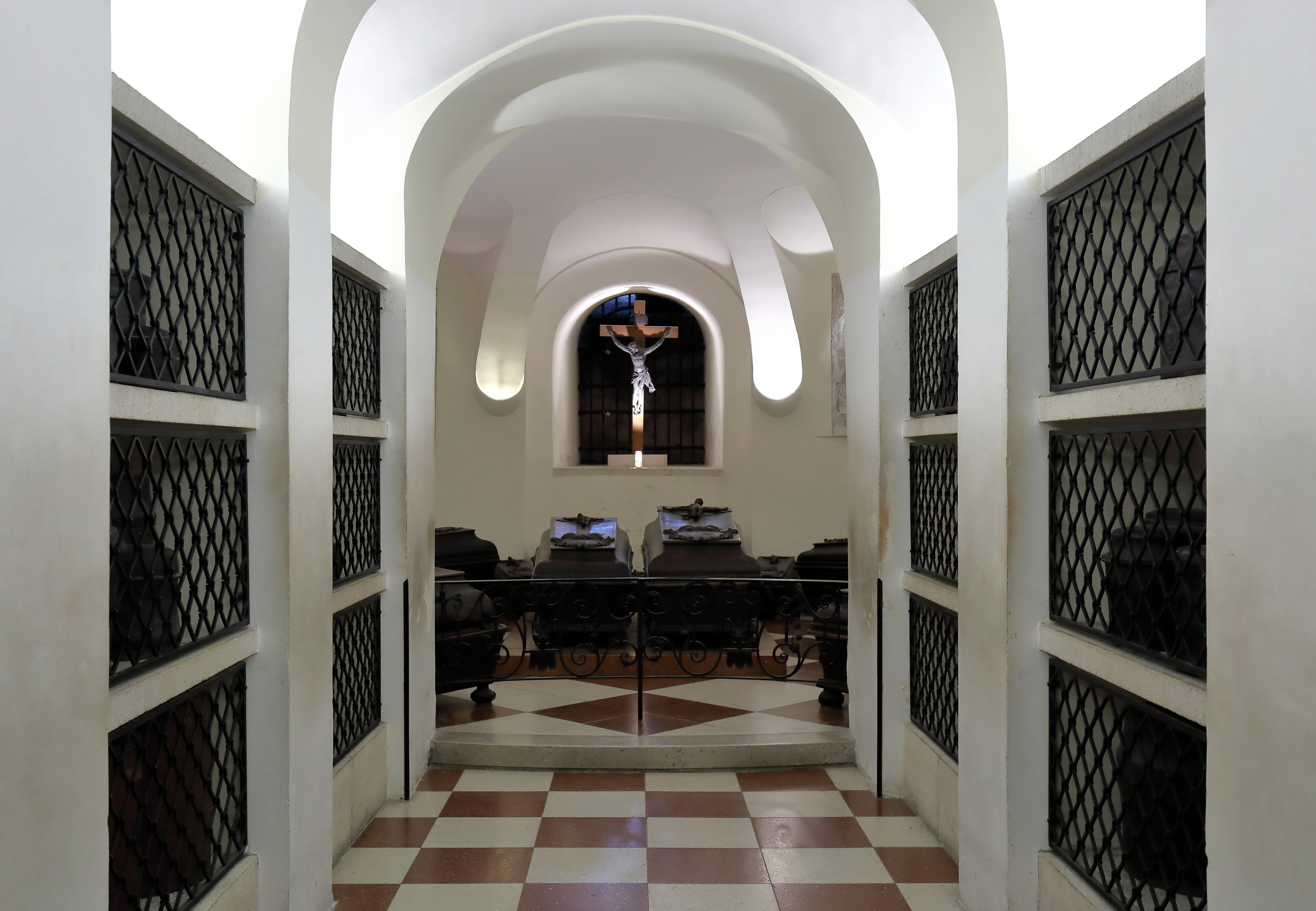
Ducal Crypt

The Ducal Crypt located under the chancel holds 78 bronze containers with the bodies, hearts, or viscera of 72 members of the Habsburg dynasty. Before his death in 1365, Duke Rudolf IV ordered the crypt built for his remains in the new cathedral he commissioned. By 1754, the small rectangular chamber was overcrowded with 12 sarcophagi and 39 urns, so the area was expanded with an oval chamber added to the east end of the rectangular one. In 1956, the two chambers were renovated and their contents rearranged. The sarcophagi of Duke Rudolf IV and his wife were placed upon a pedestal and the 62 urns containing organs were moved from the two rows of shelves around the new chamber to cabinets in the original one.

=== Organs ===
St Stephen's Cathedral has an old organ tradition. The first organ is mentioned in 1334. After the 1945 fire, Michael Kauffmann finished a large electric action pipe organ in 1960 with 125 stops and 4 manuals, financed with public donations. In 1991, the Austrian firm of Rieger rebuilt the choir organ. It is a mechanical organ, with 56 voices and 4 manuals.

The Kauffmann organ at the west end was only used for about 35 years before falling into disuse. In 2017-2020 the Austrian firm of Rieger rebuilt the west end (Riesenorgel) organ using the 1960 facade and some old pipework and this resulted in an organ of 5 manuals with 130 stops. The choir organ has its own console but there is a separate console, built 2017-2020 and comprising 5 manuals with 185 stops, from which the Riesenorgel and choir organ can be played at the same time. In addition to the Riesenorgel and choir organ the cathedral also has 3 smaller instruments.

== Conservation and restoration ==
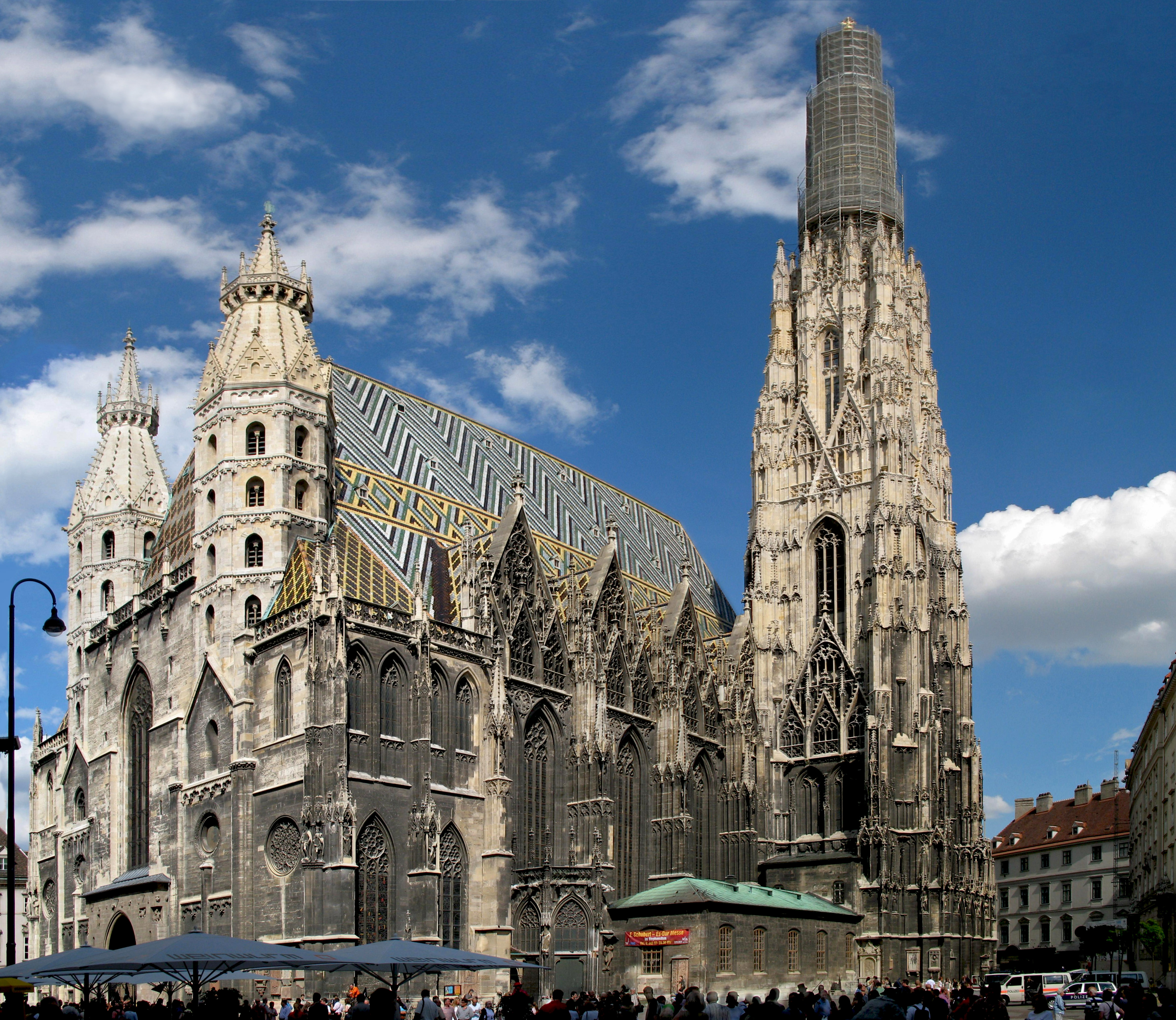
St. Stephen's Cathedral under renovation, 2007

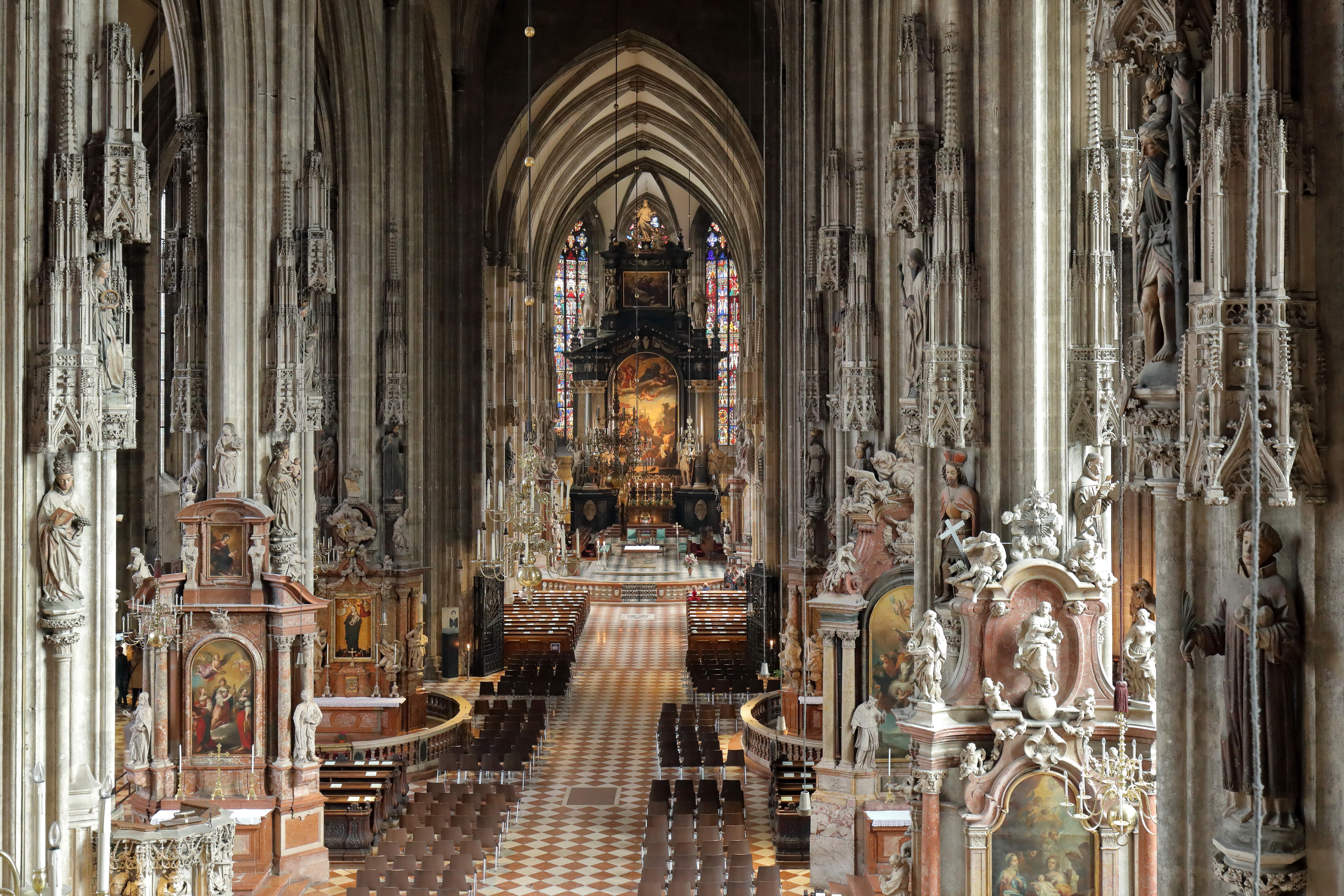
Interior after renovation. 2017

Preservation and repair of the fabric of the medieval cathedral has been a continuous process at St. Stephen's Cathedral since its original construction in 1147.

The porous limestone is subject to weathering, but coating it with a sealer like silicone would simply trap moisture inside the stone and cause it to crack faster when the water freezes. The permanent Dombauhütte (Construction Department) uses the latest scientific techniques (including laser cleaning of delicate features on stonework), and is investigating a process that would impregnate the cavities within the stone with something that would keep water from having a place to infiltrate.

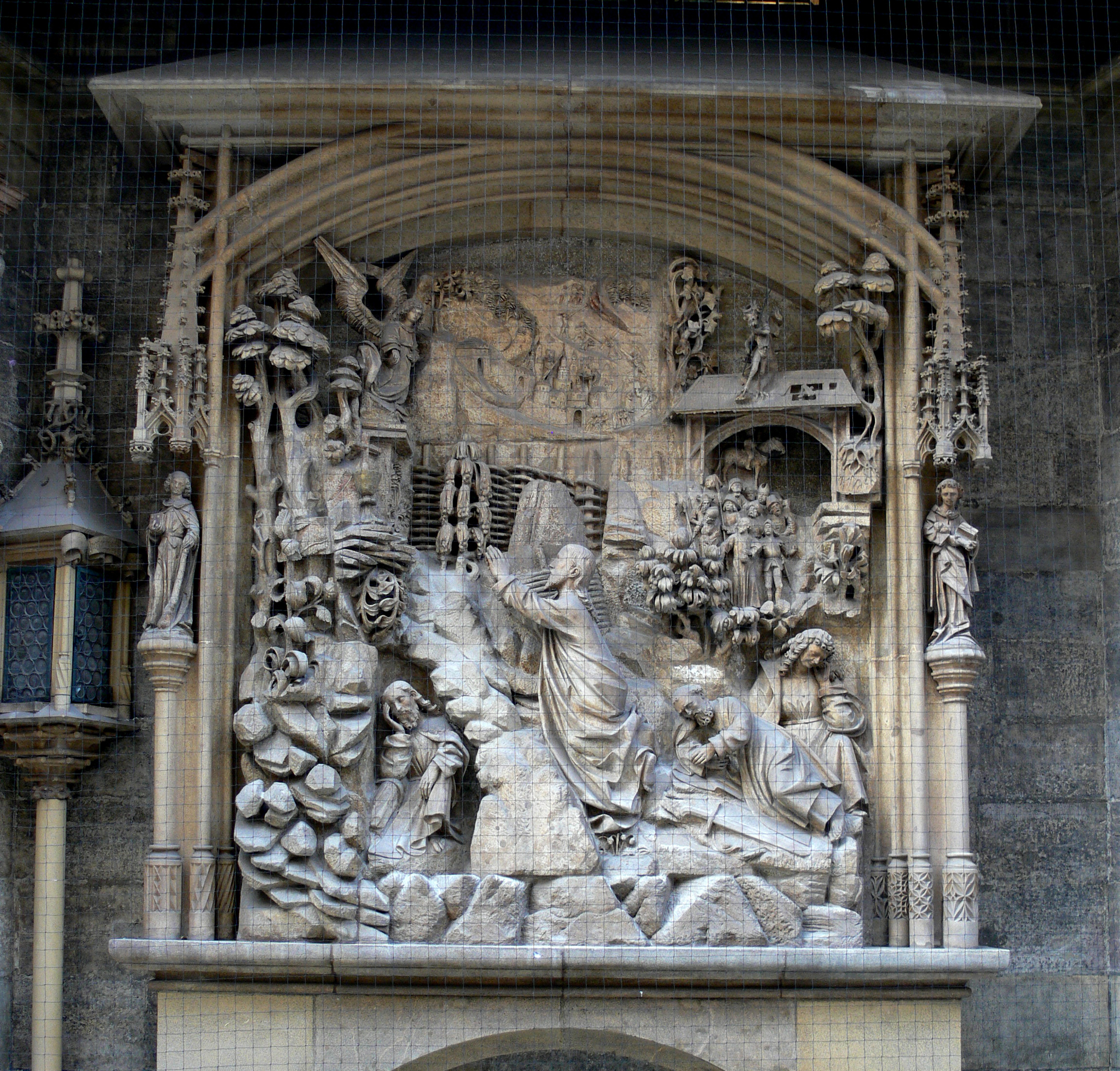
Christ in Gethsemane after restoration

Systematic cleaning of the interior is gradually proceeding around the walls, and an outdoor relief of Christ in Gethsemane is being restored.

A major project has been recently completed for which visitors and worshippers in St. Stephen's Cathedral had been waiting since 1147: better heating of the church during the winter. Previous systems, including fireplaces, just deposited soot and grease on the artwork, but the new system uses apparatus in many different locations so that there is little moving airflow to carry damaging particles. The church is now heated to around 10 °C (50 °F).

Some of the architectural drawings date from the Middle Ages and are on paper 15 ft long and too fragile to handle. Laser measurements of the ancient cathedral have now been made so that a digital 3-dimensional virtual model of the cathedral now exists in its computers, and detailed modern plans can be output at will. When weathered stonework needs to be repaired or replaced, the computerized system can create life-sized models to guide the nine full-time stonemasons on staff in the on-site workshops against the north wall of the cathedral.

On 29 March 2014, a 37-year-old man vandalized the interior of the cathedral by pushing the statue of St. Jude Thaddeus from its marble base.

In November 2019, art historians discovered a mural under layers of dirt on the wall of what is now the cathedral's gift shop. It is believed to be the work of the Renaissance artist Albrecht Dürer.

== Notable people, events and burials ==
Notable musicians who have been Kapellmeister at St. Stephen's include:

- Johann Joseph Fux 1701–1712
- Georg Reutter 1715–1728
- Johann Georg Reinhardt 1728–1738
- Johann Georg Reutter 1738–1772 – kapellmeister when Joseph Haydn and his brothers were choirboys
- Leopold Hoffmann 1772–1793
- Johann Georg Albrechtsberger 1793–1809
- Joseph Preindl 1809–1823
- Johann Baptist Gänsbacher 1823–1844
- Joseph Drechsler 1844–1852
- Johann Baptist Krall

The cathedral has hosted the weddings and funerals of many notable figures in Austrian and European history.

- Weddings of royalty: Louis II of Hungary and Mary of Austria (1515); Ferdinand I, Holy Roman Emperor and Anne of Bohemia and Hungary (1515)
- Weddings of musicians: Teresa Cornelys and Angelo Pompeati (1745); Joseph Haydn and Maria Anna Theresia Keller (1760); Wolfgang Amadeus Mozart and Constanze Weber (1782) – Mozart's funeral in 1791 took place in the Chapel of the Holy Cross
- Funeral of Antonio Vivaldi (1741)
- Wedding of Antonie Brentano (1798), a patroness of the arts who is speculated to be Beethoven's "Immortal Beloved"
- Funerals of members of the House of Habsburg: Franz Joseph I of Austria (1916), Emperor of Austria during World War I and Kaiser for 68 years; Zita of Bourbon-Parma (1989), last Empress of Austria; Otto von Habsburg (2011), last Crown-Prince of Austria-Hungary
- Funerals of European royalty: Matthias Corvinus (also Matthias I), King of Hungary and Croatia
- Funerals of politicians: Thomas Klestil (2004), former president of Austria; Kurt Waldheim (2007), former president of Austria and Secretary-General of the United Nations
- Funeral of Niki Lauda (2019), former Formula One world champion and entrepreneur.

Notable figures buried in the crypt: (For a list of nobility buried in the crypt, see Ducal Crypt, Vienna)

- Johannes Cuspinian (born Johan Spießhaymer) – Austrian humanist, historian, scientist, and diplomat
- Jan van Hoogstraten – Dutch Golden Age painter
- Neidhart von Reuental – minnesinger
- Former archbishops of Vienna: Christoph Anton Migazzi, Johann Rudolf Kutschker, Joseph Othmar Rauscher

== Stephansdom in popular culture ==
As Vienna's landmark, the St. Stephen's Cathedral is featured in media including films, video games, and television shows. These include The Third Man and Burnout 3. The cathedral is also depicted on the Austrian 10 cent euro coins and on the packaging of the Manner-Schnitten wafer treat. The Archdiocese of Vienna allowed the Manner company to use the cathedral as its logo in return for funding the wages of one stonemason doing repair work on the cathedral. In 2008, Sarah Brightman performed a concert promoting her latest album, Symphony, which was recorded for a TV broadcast and a further DVD release in late September.

== Balassi Mass ==
Since 2008, the two sabres of the Balint Balassi Memorial Sword Award, founded by Pal Molnar, have been blessed during a Balassi Mass held a few days before the award ceremony. On 25 January 2013, in the presence of some three hundred Hungarians, Bishop Laszlo Kiss-Rigo blessed the two swords during a Mass celebrated in the cathedral.

== Gallery ==
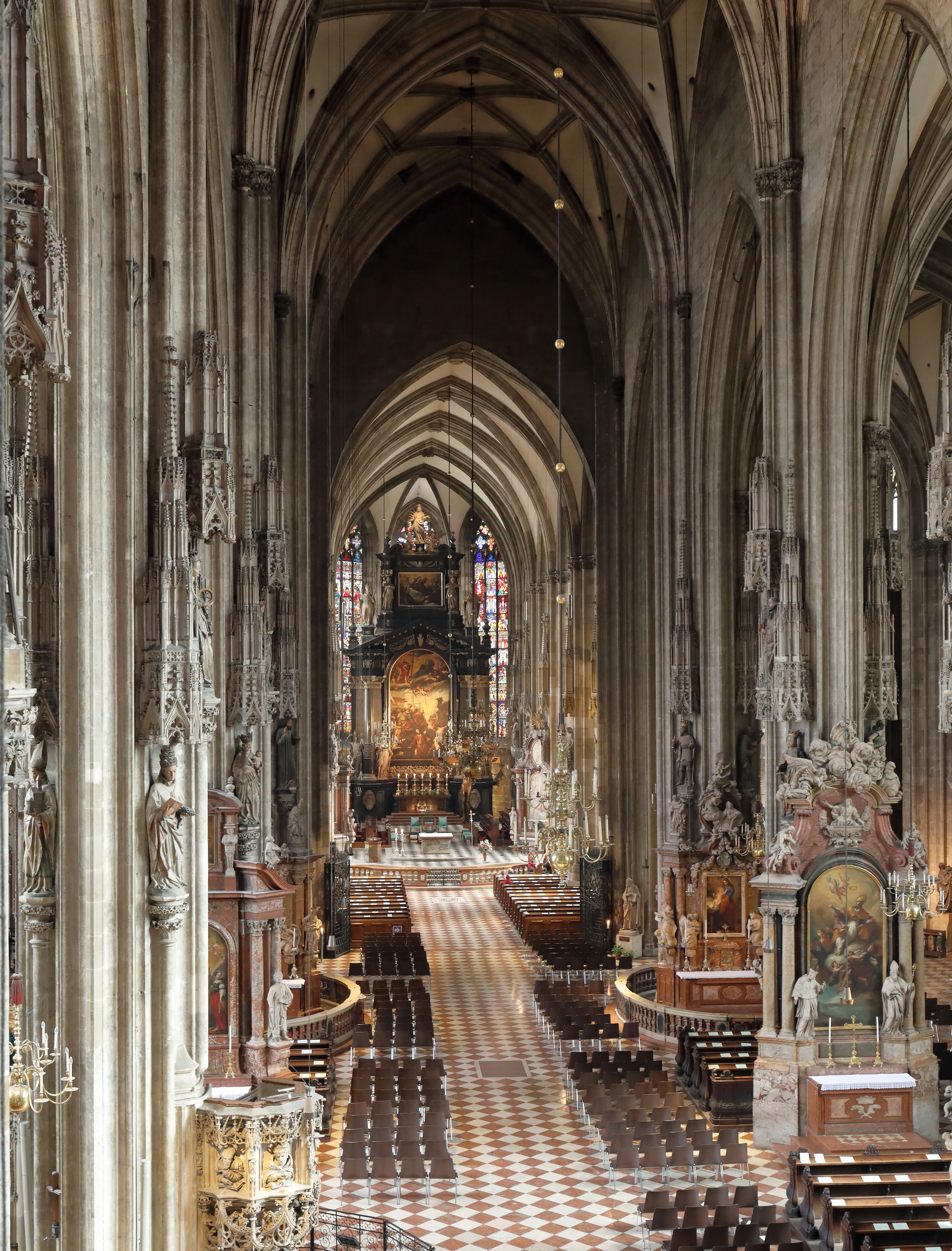
Nave, looking east

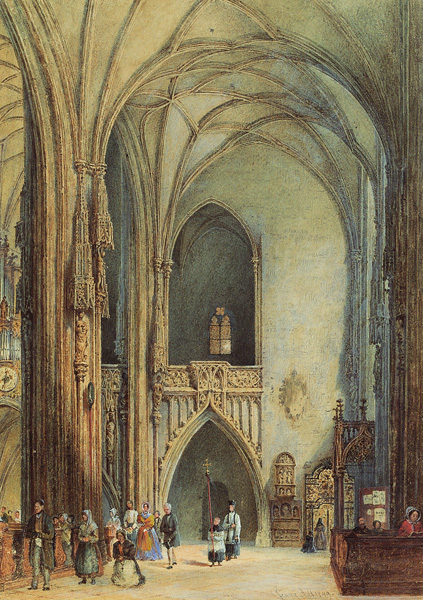
North aisle, 1849

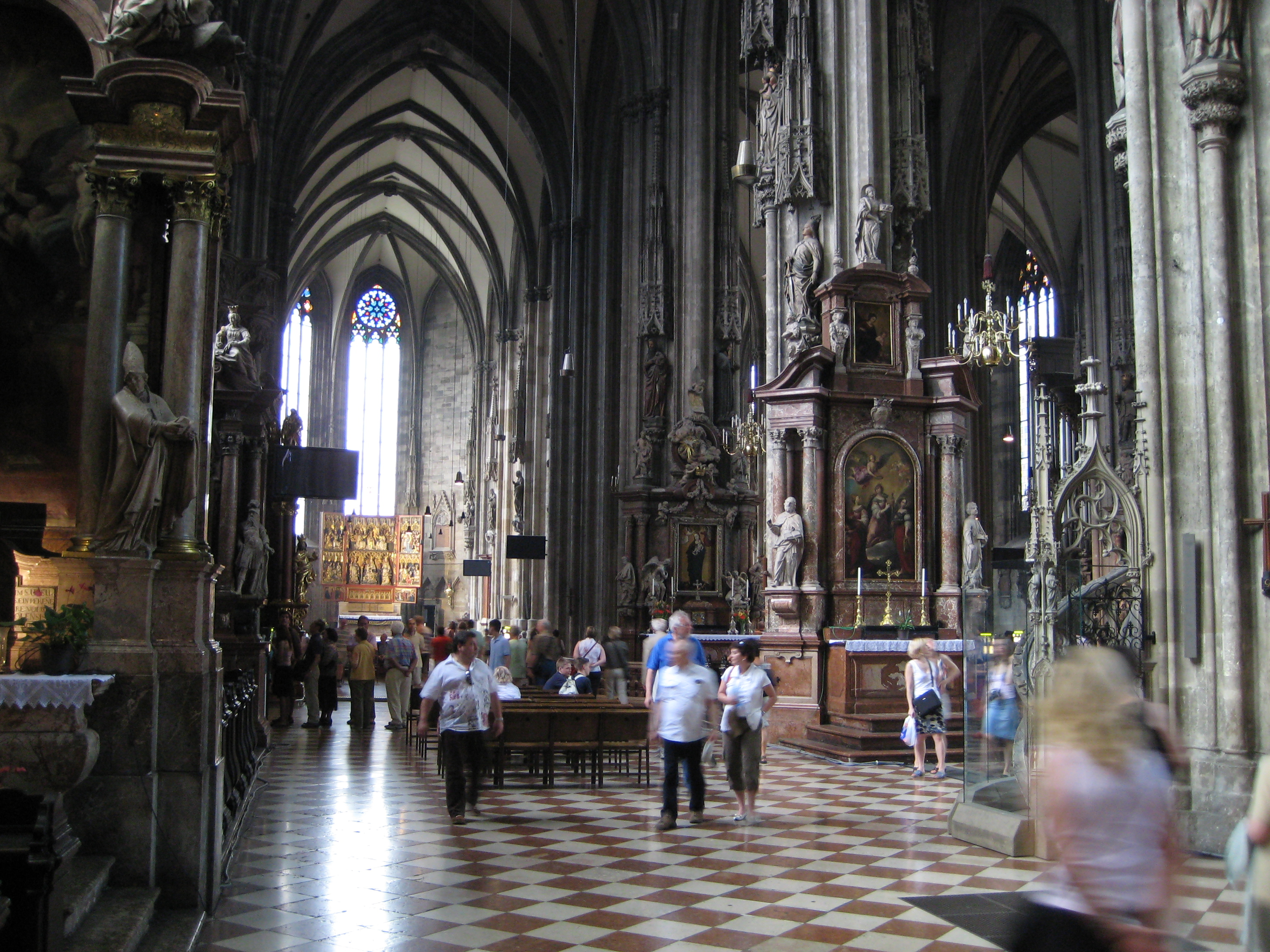
Interior

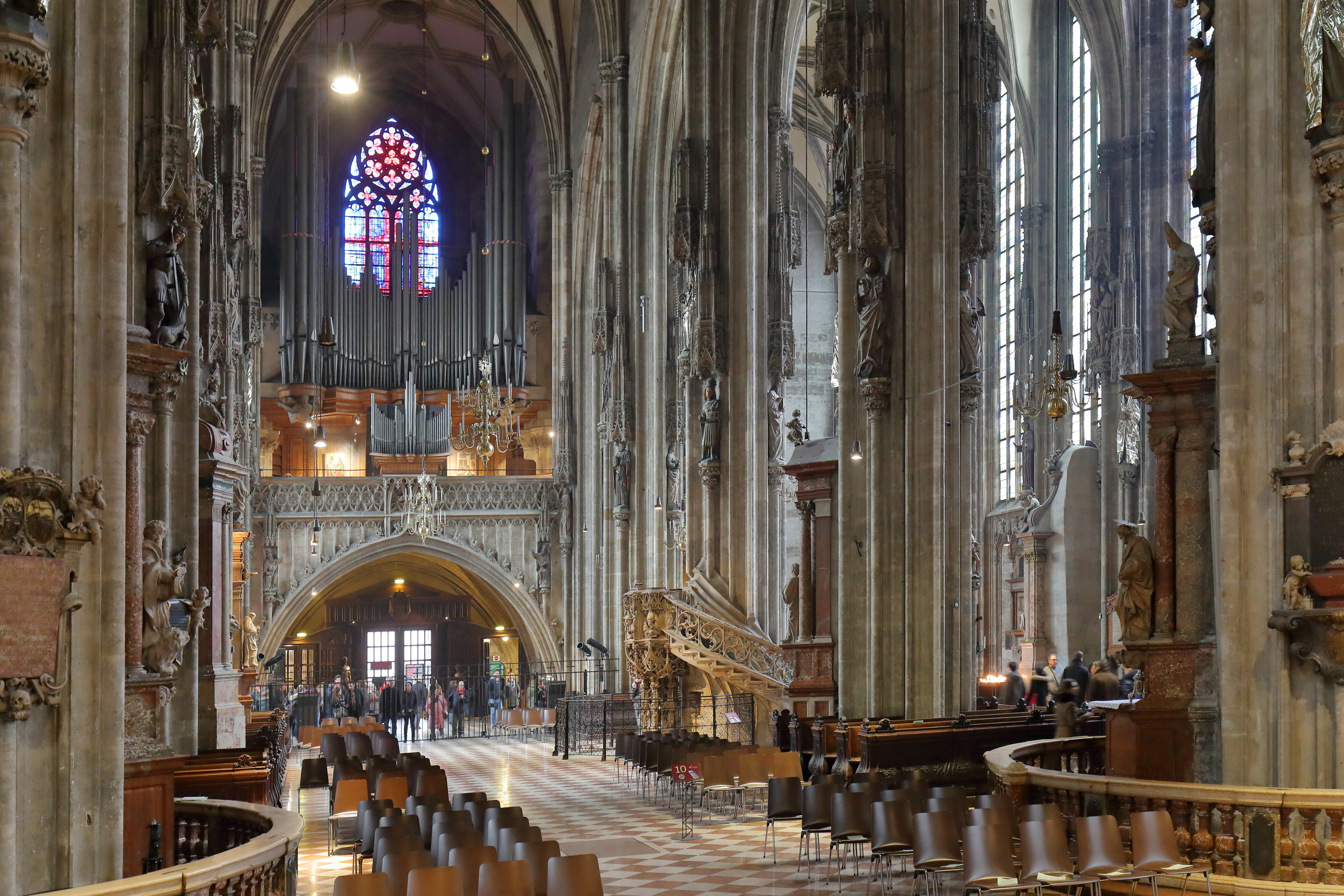
Nave with organ and pulpit

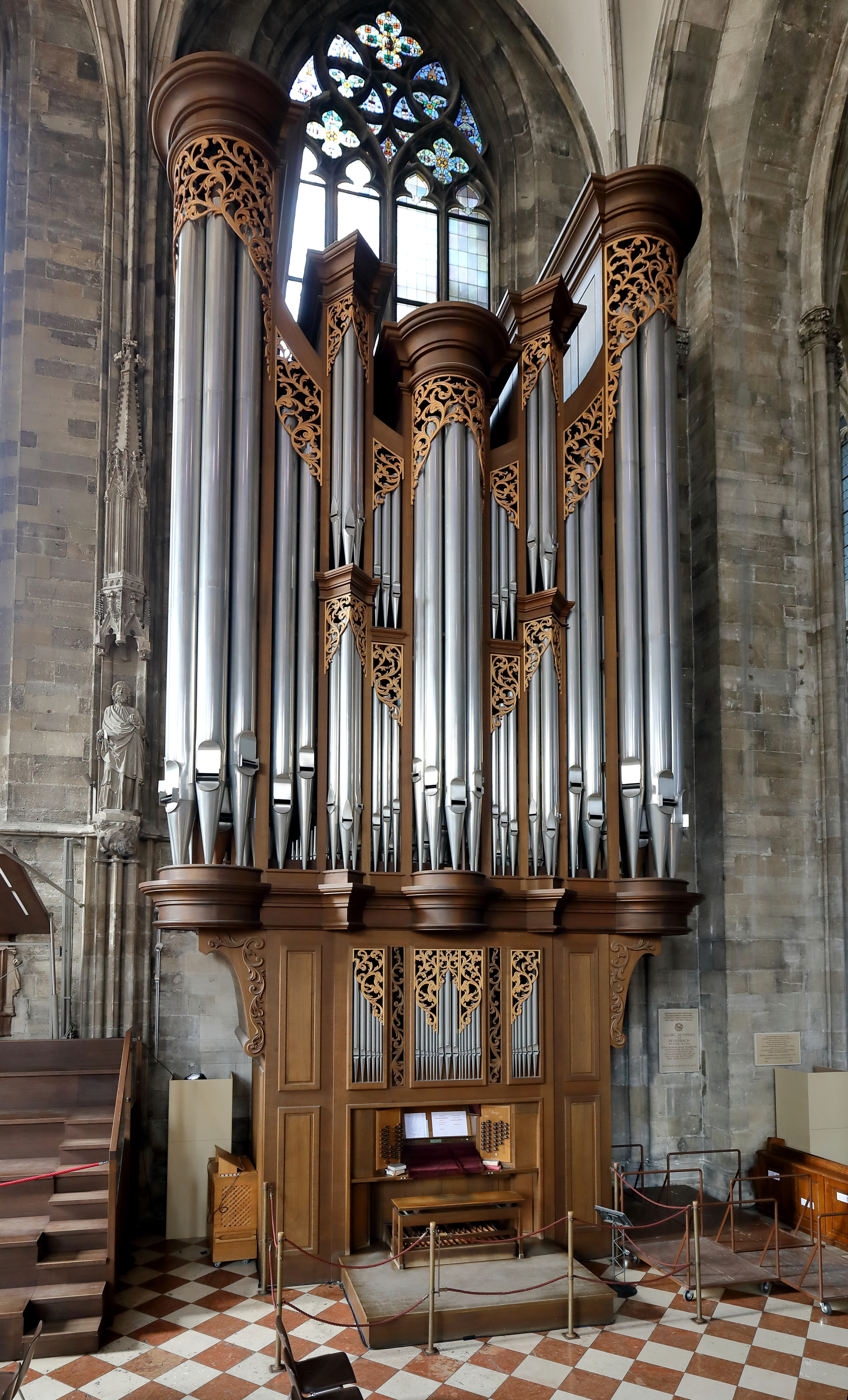
Organ on the side wall

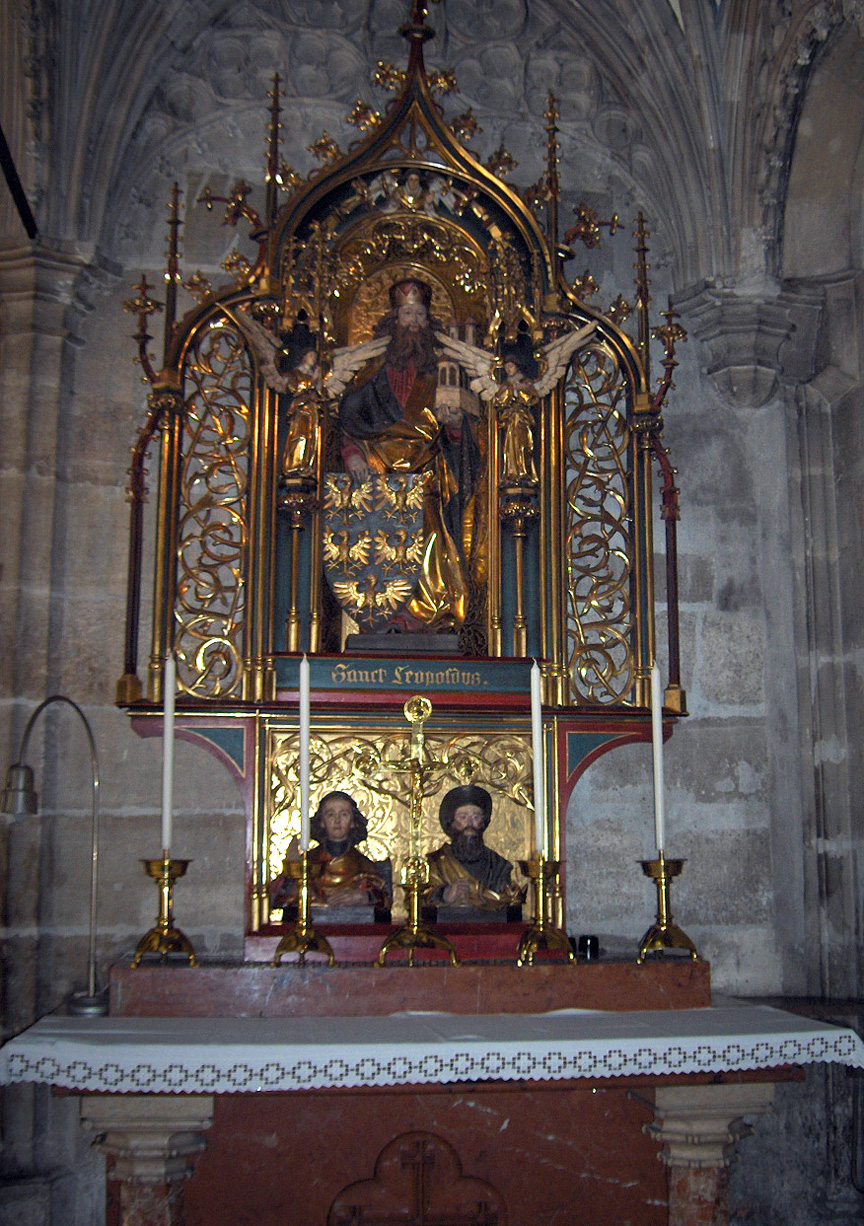
St. Leopold side chapel

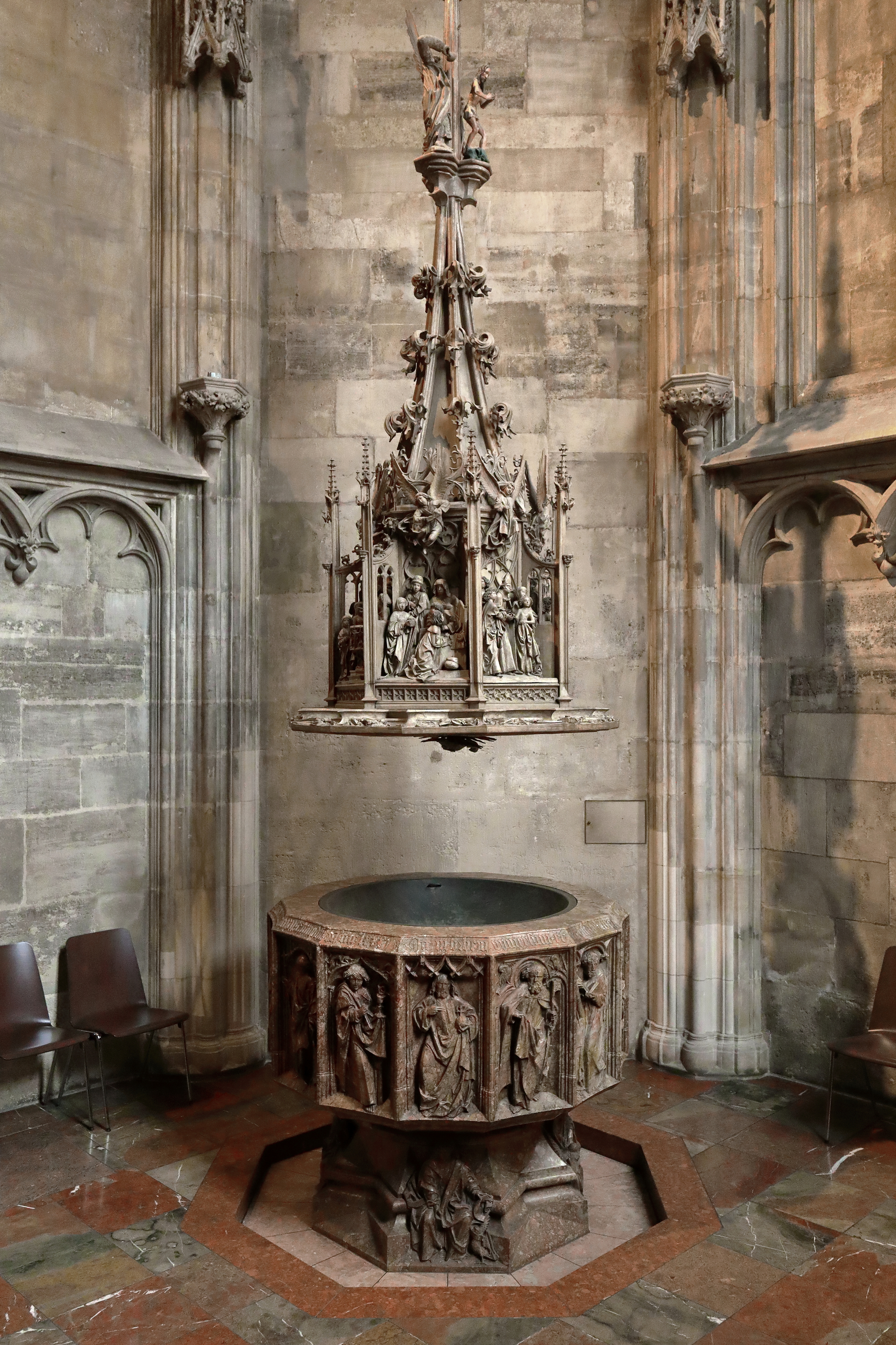
Baptismal font

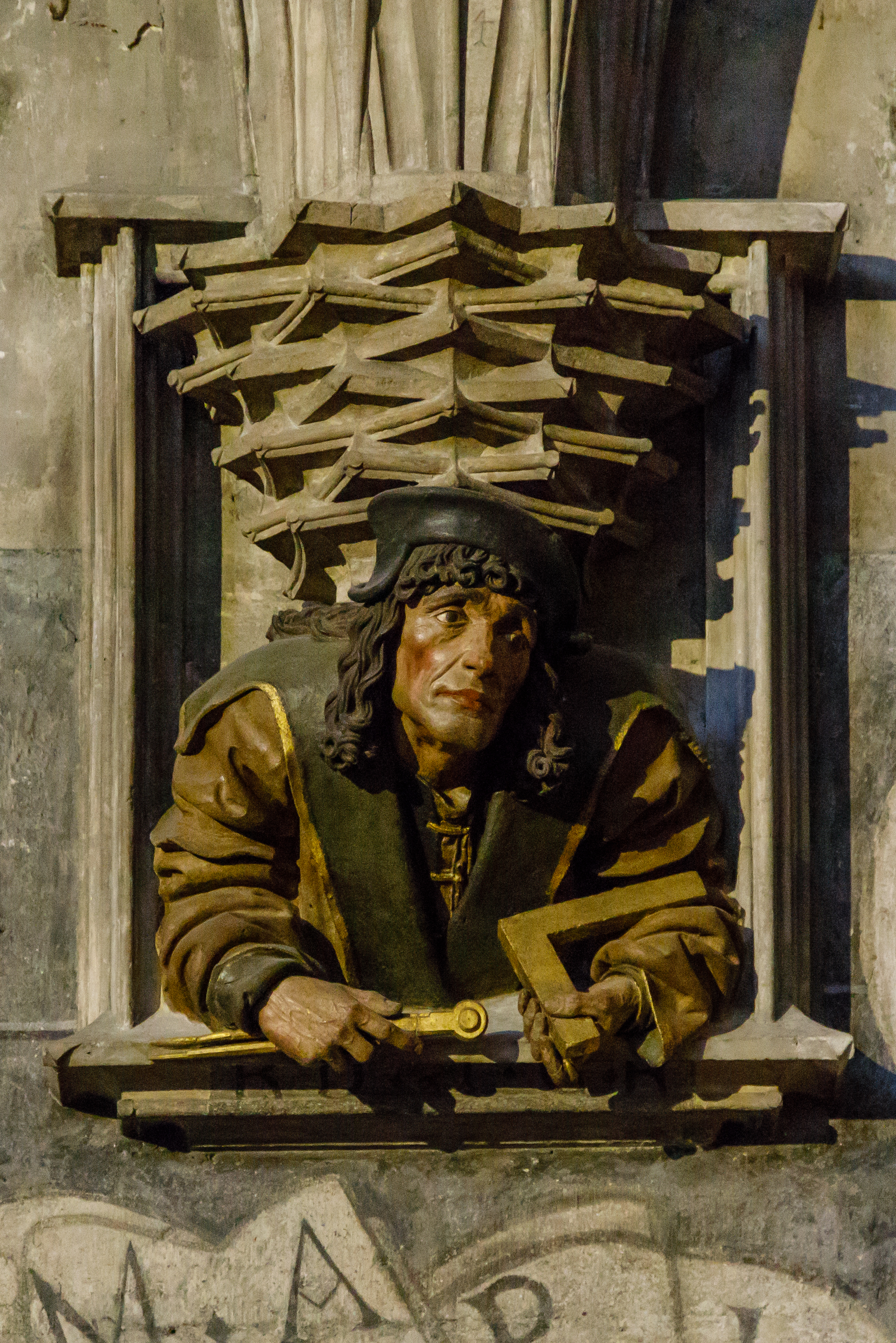
Portrait of Anton Pilgram

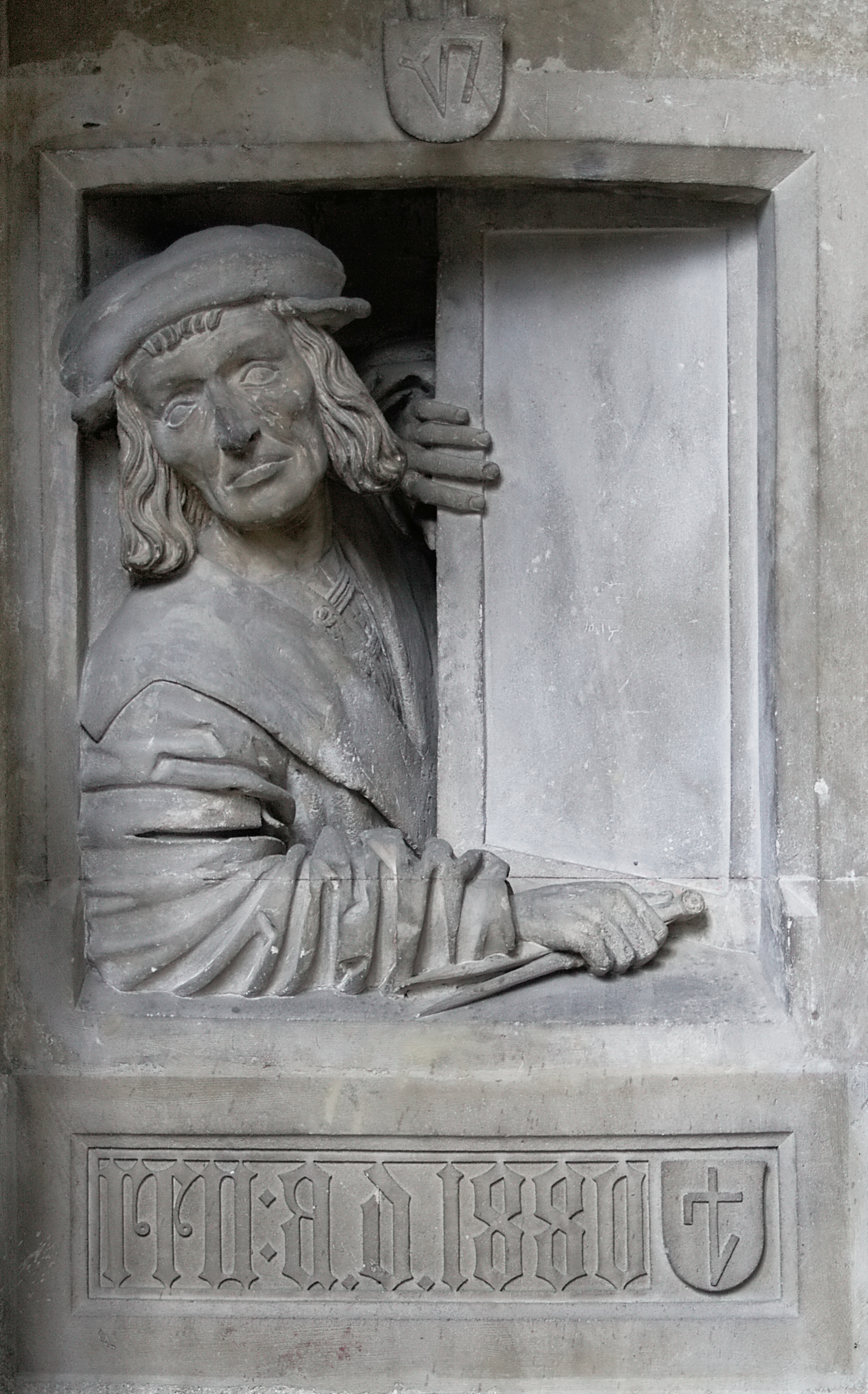
The Fenstergucker

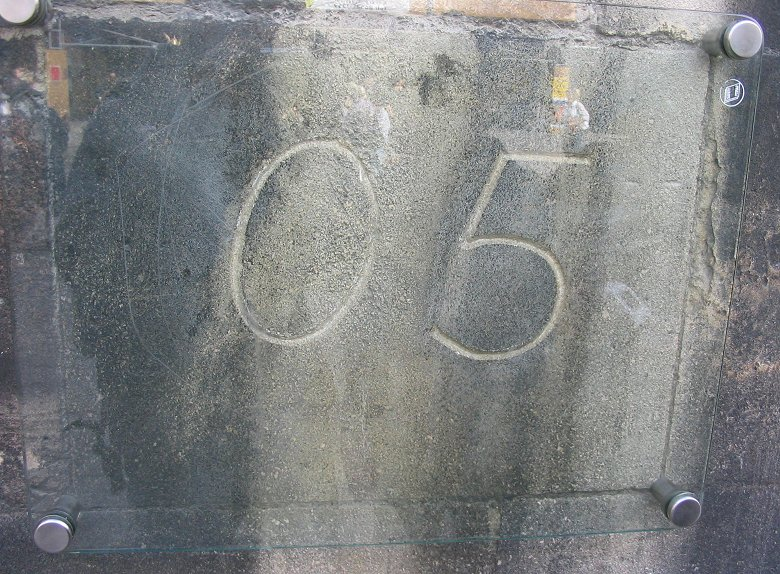
05 symbol for Austrian Resistance

== See also ==
- List of tallest churches
- Stephansplatz, Vienna
- List of Gothic Cathedrals in Europe
- List of tallest structures built before the 20th century
- Megalothorax sanctistephani
- List of cathedrals in Austria
- Late medieval domes
