= Seminary of Vienna =

Roman Catholic seminary in Vienna, Austria

Archiepiscopal Seminary of Vienna
- Erzbischöfliches Priesterseminar Wien
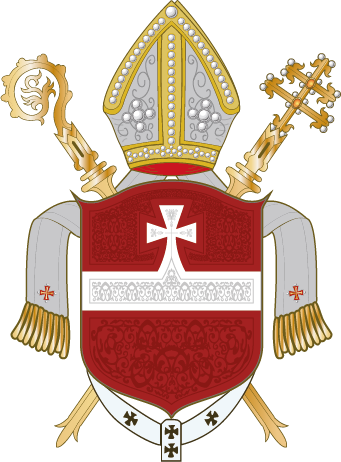
- Coat of arms of the Archdiocese of Vienna
- Type: Diocesan major seminary
- Established: 1758; 268 years ago by Christoph Anton Migazzi
- Parent institution: Archdiocese of Vienna
- Affiliations: Roman Catholic
- Rector: Richard Tatzreiter
- Students: 35 (2014)
- Location: Vienna, Austria
- Campus: Haus Boltzmanngasse
- Language: German
- Website: Official website

The Archiepiscopal Seminary of Vienna (German: Erzbischöfliches Priesterseminar Wien), commonly referred to in German as the Wiener Priesterseminar, is a Roman Catholic major seminary that serves as the seminary of the Archdiocese of Vienna. Founded in 1758 by the Archbishop of Vienna, Christoph Anton Migazzi, the seminary moved to its current building, the Haus Boltzmanngasse, in 1914. Today, the rector is Rev. Richard Tatzreiter and enrollment is 35.

== History ==
The Archiepiscopal Seminary of Vienna was founded in 1758 by Count Christoph Anton Migazzi, the Archbishop of Vienna, as the main seminary for the training of priests for the Archdiocese of Vienna. For many years, it was located in the Curhaus in Stephansplatz, the same square in Vienna where St. Stephen's Cathedral is located. The building was expanded in 1805 during the reign of Archbishop Sigismund Anton von Hohenwart in order to accommodate more seminarians. By 1912, the seminary had grown to 112 seminarians.

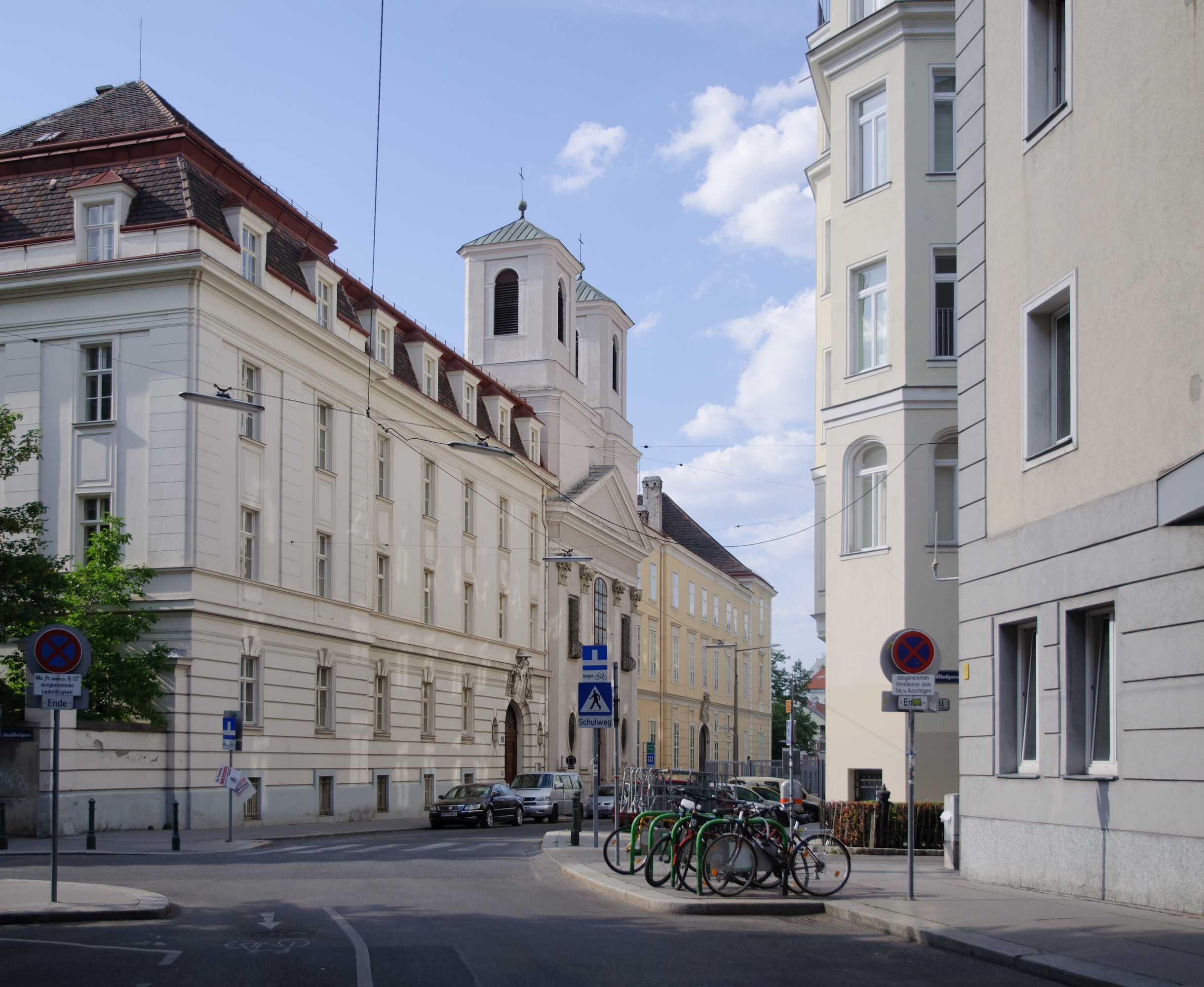
Haus Boltzmanngasse, home of the Seminary of Vienna since 1914.

During the reign of Cardinal Franz Xaver Nagl, the Haus Boltzmanngasse, a former hospital and later orphanage in the Alsergrund district of Vienna, was restored and expanded. The new archbishop, Friedrich Gustav Piffl, made the decision to move the seminary from Curhaus to Boltzmanngasse. The seminary made the move in the summer of 1914, and has remained in the new building ever since.

Beginning with the 2012–2013 academic year, seminarians from the Burgenländisches Seminary and St. Pölten Seminary will be living and studying in the Seminary of Vienna facilities. In 2014, the seminary had 35 seminarians.

== Administration and organization ==
Rev. Richard Tatzreiter is the seminary rector, and Rev. Markus Muth is vice rector. Rev. Michael Meßner, SJ, is the spiritual director, and Michael Sipka is the librarian.

== Student life ==
=== Student body ===
In 2014, there were 35 seminarians at the Seminary of Vienna. However, in addition to this, there are a number of other seminarians from the Burgenländisches Seminary and St. Pölten Seminary, which are now located in the same building.

== Notable people ==
=== Alumni ===
- Hans Hermann Groër, Austrian Benedictine cardinal; Archbishop of Vienna
- Rudolf Henke, Austrian writer and producer at the Austrian Broadcasting Corporation
- Prince Alexander of Hohenlohe-Waldenburg-Schillingsfürst, German Roman Catholic priest
- Theodor Innitzer; Austrian cardinal and politician; Archbishop of Vienna
- Franz Jáchym, Austrian Roman Catholic bishop; coadjutor bishop of Vienna
- Joseph Kenner, Austrian artist and politician
- Blessed Franz Alexander Kern; Austrian Premonstratensian priest
- Nikolaus Krasa, Austrian Roman Catholic priest; Vicar General of the Archdiocese of Vienna
- Florian Kuntner, Austrian Roman Catholic bishop; Auxiliary Bishop of Vienna
- Štefan László, Austrian Roman Catholic bishop; Bishop of Eisenstadt
- Leopold Lentner, Austrian Roman Catholic priest and theologian; director of the Vienna Catechetical Institute
- Heinrich Maier, Austrian Roman Catholic priest and educator; member of the Austrian Resistance
- Godfried Marschall, Austrian Roman Catholic bishop; Vicar General and Auxiliary Bishop of Vienna
- Laurenz Mayer, Austrian Roman Catholic bishop; Auxiliary Bishop of Vienna
- Johannes Nedbal, Austrian Roman Catholic priest and theologian; rector of the Collegio Teutonico
- Konstantin Reymaier; Austrian Roman Catholic priest, composer, and organist
- Karl Rühringer, Moravian Roman Catholic bishop
- Wenzel Schanz, Austrian Roman Catholic priest and theologian; professor at the University of Vienna
- Franz Scharl, Austrian Roman Catholic bishop; Auxiliary Bishop of Vienna
- Anton Schiestl, Austrian Roman Catholic priest and art collector
- Johann Baptist Schneider, Austrian Roman Catholic bishop; Vicar General and Auxiliary Bishop of Vienna
- Blessed Anton Maria Schwartz, Austrian Roman Catholic priest; founder of the Pious Workers of St. Joseph Calasanctius of the Mother of God
- Alois Schwarz, Austrian Roman Catholic bishop; Bishop of Gurk-Klagenfurt
- Vinzenz Eduard Milde; Austrian Roman Catholic archbishop; Bishop of Litomērice and Archbishop of Vienna
- Thomas Renner, Austrian Benedictine priest; abbot of Altenburg Abbey
- Stephan Turnovszky, Austrian Roman Catholic bishop; Auxiliary Bishop of Vienna
- Leopold Ungar, Austrian Roman Catholic priest; director of Caritas in the Archdiocese of Vienna
- Rudolf Weiler, Austrian Roman Catholic priest and theologian
- Raimund Weissensteiner, Austrian Roman Catholic priest and composer
- Michael Weninger, Austrian Roman Catholic priest and diplomat; Austrian Ambassador to Yugoslavia and Serbia and Montenegro
- Friedrich Wessely, Austrian Roman Catholic priest and theologian; professor at the University of Vienna
- Hermann Zschokke, Austrian Roman Catholic bishop; Auxiliary Bishop of Vienna

=== Faculty ===
- Johann Kurz, Austrian Roman Catholic priest and educator; prefect of studies at the seminary from 1939 to 1941
- Maria Loley, Austrian social worker and educator; professor at the seminary from 1996 to 2003
- Heinrich Segur, Austrian Jesuit priest and educator; spiritual director at the seminary from 1966 to 1969

=== Rectors ===
- Richard Tatzreiter (1 January 2011 – )

== See also ==
- Catholic Church in Austria
- List of Roman Catholic seminaries
