= Christian Feurstein =

Austrian Roman Catholic priest and Cistercian monk

The Right Reverend Christian Feurstein KCHS OCist
- Abbot of Rein Abbey
- Church: Roman Catholic Church
- Elected: 8 June 2010
- Installed: 12 July 2010
- Term ended: 9 March 2015
- Predecessor: Petrus Steigenberger
- Successor: Benedikt Fink (administrator)

Orders
- Ordination: 23 May 1983 by Paul Augustin Mayer, OSB

Personal details
- Born: Georg Maria Feurstein; 14 October 1958 Hohenems, Vorarlberg, Austria
- Died: 12 March 2017 (aged 58) Vienna, Austria
- Residence: Heiligenkreuz Abbey (1977-1988); Stiepel Priory (1988-2004); Heiligenkruez Abbey (2004-2009); Rein Abbey (2009-2017)
- Parents: Guntram & Antonia Feurstein
- Motto: Christum semper ante oculos Christ always before our eyes

Christian Feurstein, KCHS, OCist (born Georg Maria Feurstein; 14 October 1958 – 12 March 2017) was an Austrian Roman Catholic priest and Cistercian monk at Heiligenkreuz Abbey, Stiepel Priory, Rein Abbey in Gratwein-Straßengel, Styria. He served as abbot of the Rein Abbey from 2010 to 2015.

== Biography ==
=== Early life and education ===
Georg Maria Feurstein was born on 14 October 1958 in Hohenems, Vorarlberg, Austria, to Guntram and Antonio Feurstein. After graduation, he entered Heiligenkreuz Abbey as a novice on 15 November 1977. He studied theology at the Benedict XVI Philosophical-Theological University, which is located at the abbey, from 1977 to 1983. Taking the religious name Christian, he made his solemn profession on 1 November 1981, and was ordained a deacon on 26 December 1981 by Archbishop Franz Jachym. On 23 May 1983, he was ordained in Heiligenkreuz by Cardinal Paul Augustin Mayer, OSB.

=== Priesthood ===
In 1983, Feurstein began his priestly ministry as pastor of a parish in Wiener Neustadt, a position he held in 1987, and until 1988 he was an assistant teacher at Heiligenkreuz Abbey. In 1988, he was sent with three other monks to the newly reestablished Stiepel Priory in Bochum, Germany. He was subprior there from 1988 to 1991, pilgrimage director from 1988 to 2001, novice master from 1999 to 2002, and prior from 2001 to 2004. In 2004, he returned to Heiligenkreuz Abbey, where he served as prior and novice master until 2009. During his time in that position, 26 novices entered the abbey, the most in 200 years. In 2009, he once again left Heiligenkreuz, this time to live at Rein Abbey in Styria, Austria. On 8 June 2010, he was unanimously elected abbot, and was confirmed by the congregation on 21 June. His benediction took place on 21 August 2010, performed by Bishop Egon Kapellari. As abbot, he was concerned with the stability of the monastic community and the pastoral care of the parishes the abbey is entrusted with, as well as monastery renovations and improving the abbey's financial situation. The abbey basilica was restored and renovated during his tenure.

In 2013, Feurstein was accepted into the Order of the Holy Sepulchre with the rank of Knight Commander with Star, and was invested by Grand Master Cardinal Edwin Frederick O'Brien on 21 September 2013 at the Mondsee Abbey basilica. He resigned from the office of abbot on 9 March 2015 due to his severe heart disease, and returned to Heiligenkreuz Abbey, where he spent the last two years of his life. He died on 12 March 2017 in a hospital in Vienna after a heart transplant. Bishop Wilhelm Krautwaschl said about his death: "Abbot Christian was a special phenomenon in all his meetings with his kind and sympathetic charisma. We will be grateful to him for his work here in Styria."

His motto was Christum semper ante oculos, which is Latin for "Christ always before our eyes."

== Awards and honors ==
- Knight Commander with Star of the Order of the Holy Sepulchre (2013)
