= Our Lady of Lourdes Grotto =

Our Lady of Lourdes Grotto may refer to:

- Sanctuary of Our Lady of Lourdes, France
- Our Lady of Lourdes Grotto, Heiligenkreuz, Austria
- Our Lady of Lourdes Grotto Shrine, San Jose del Monte, Philippines

== See also ==
- Lourdes grotto, for the general concept
