= Joseph Calasanz =

Spanish priest, educator, founder of the Piarists, & saint (1557–1648)

Saint Joseph Calasanz SchP
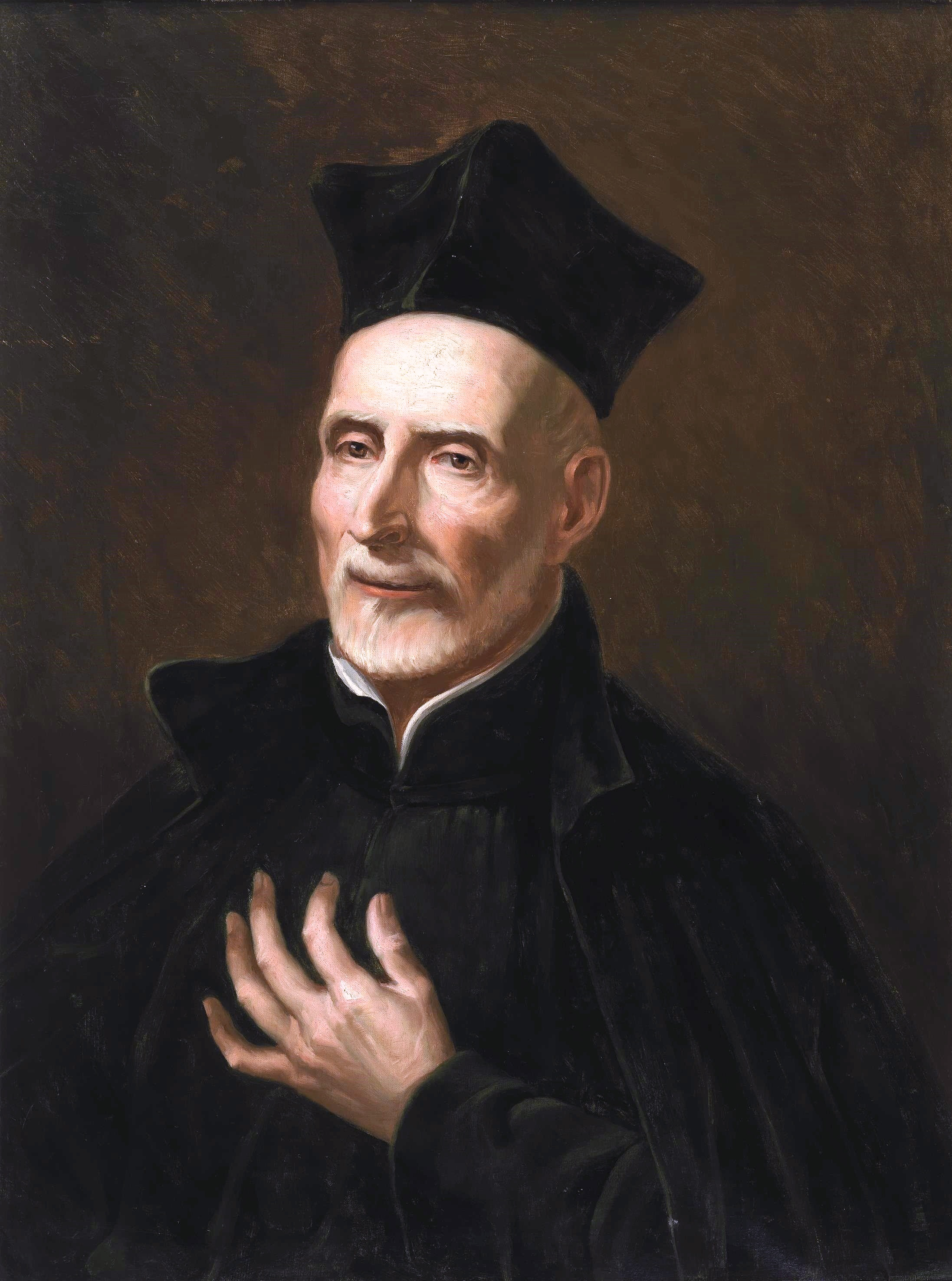
- Portrait by Francisco Jover y Casanova, currently held in the Museo del Prado

Confessor
- Born: 11 September 1557; Peralta de la Sal, Kingdom of Aragon, Crown of Aragon
- Died: 25 August 1648 (aged 90); Rome, Papal States
- Venerated in: Catholic Church
- Beatified: 7 August 1748, Rome, Papal States by Pope Benedict XIV
- Canonized: 16 July 1767, Rome, Papal States by Pope Clement XIII
- Major shrine: San Pantaleo, Rome
- Feast: August 25; August 27 (Pre-1969 General Roman Calendar)

Joseph Calasanz Sch.P. (Catalan: Josep de Calassanç; Spanish: José de Calasanz; Italian: Giuseppe Calasanzio; September 11, 1557 – August 25, 1648), also known as Joseph Calasanctius and Josephus a Matre Dei, was a Spanish Catholic priest, educator and the founder of the Pious Schools, which provided free education to poor boys. For this purpose he founded the religious order that ran them, commonly known as the Piarists. He became a close friend of the renowned astronomer Galileo Galilei. Joseph is honored as a saint by the Catholic Church, following his 1767 papal canonisation.

== Early biography ==
Calasanz was born in Peralta de Calasanz (before de la Sal) in the Kingdom of Aragon, on September 11, 1557, the youngest in a family of eight children, and the second son. His parents were Pedro de Calasanz y de Mur, an infanzón (minor nobleman) and town mayor, and Pedro's wife María Gastón y de Sala. Joseph had two sisters, Marta and Cristina. In his youth, he was nearly two meters tall. His parents gave him a good education at home and then at the elementary school of Peralta. In 1569, he was sent for classical studies to a college in Estadilla run by the friars of the Trinitarian Order. While there, at the age of 14, he determined that he wanted to become a priest. In this, however, he met with no support from his parents.

For his higher studies, Calasanz took up philosophy and law at the University of Lleida, where he was awarded the degree of Doctor of Laws cum laude. He then began theology studies at the University of Valencia and at the Complutense University, which at the time was still located at its original site in Alcalá de Henares.

Joseph's mother and brother having died, his father wanted him to marry and carry on the family. But a sickness in 1582 soon brought Joseph to the brink of the grave, which caused his father to relent. When he recovered, the Bishop of Urgel, Hugo Ambrosio de Moncada, ordained him as a priest on December 17, 1583.

During his ecclesiastical career in Spain, Calasanz held various offices in his native region. He began his ministry in the diocese of Albarracín, where Bishop Gaspar Juan de la Figuera appointed him his theologian, confessor, synodal examiner, and procurator. When the bishop was transferred to Lerida, Calasanz followed him to the new diocese. During that period, he spent several years in La Seu d'Urgell. As secretary of the cathedral chapter, Calasanz had broad administrative responsibilities. In Claverol, a distant village to the northeast of Lerida, he established a foundation that distributed food to the poor.

In October 1585, Bishop de la Figuera was sent as apostolic visitor to the Abbey of Montserrat and Calasanz accompanied him as his secretary. The bishop died the following year and Calasanz left, though urgently requested to remain. He hurried to Peralta de Calasanz to attend the death of his father. He was then called by the Bishop of Urgel to act as vicar general for the district of Tremp.

== In Rome ==
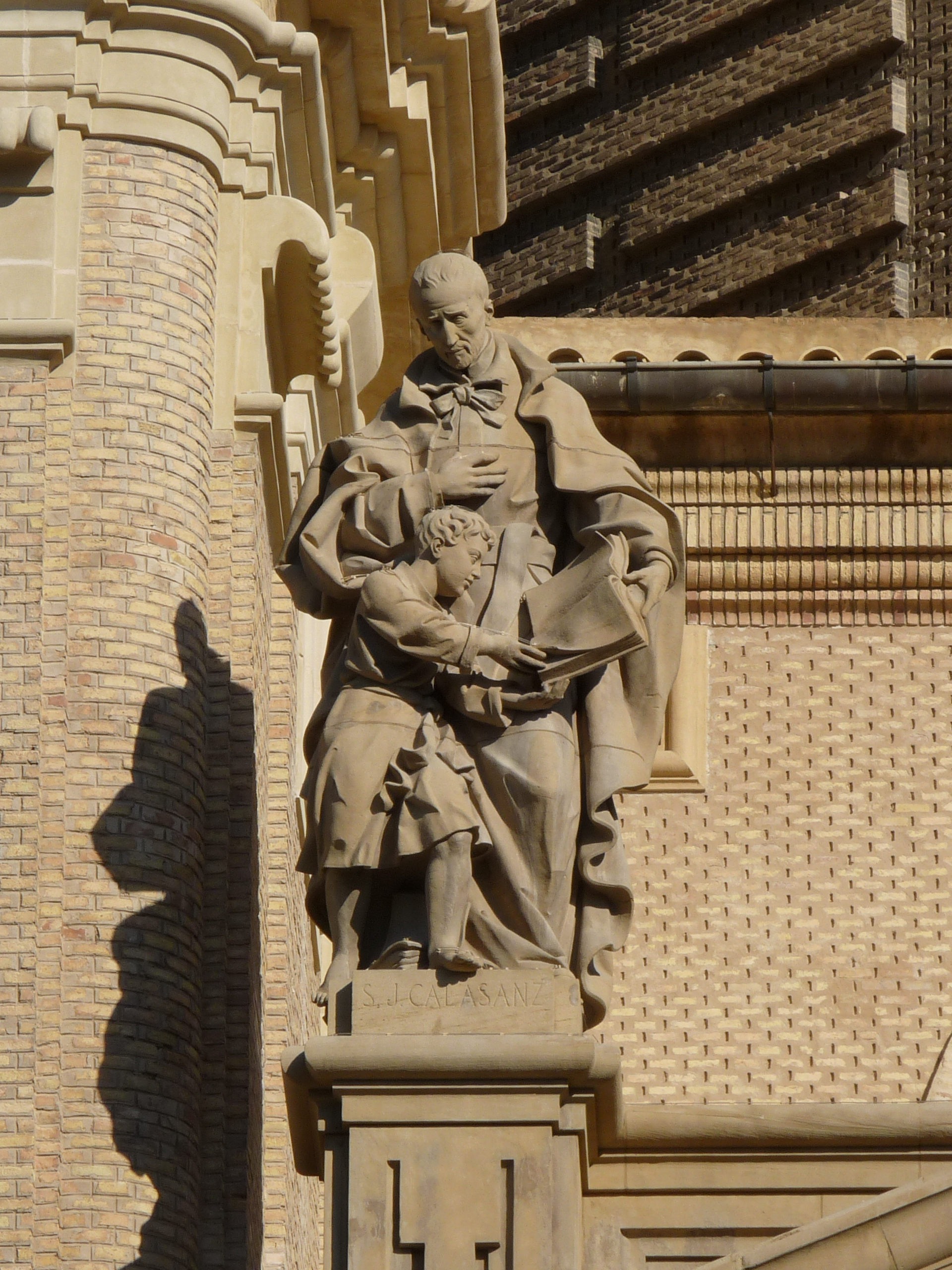
San José de Calasanz, Zaragoza

In 1592, at 35, Calasanz moved to Rome. He hoped to further his ecclesiastical career and secure some kind of benefice. He lived there for most of his remaining 56 years. In Rome, Calasanz found a protector in Cardinal Marcoantonio Colonna, who chose him as his theologian and, once he had learned to express himself in Italian, entrusted him with the spiritual direction of his household. The city of Rome offered many opportunities for works of charity, especially for the instruction of neglected and homeless children, many of whom had lost their parents. Joseph joined the Confraternity of Christian Doctrine and gathered boys from the streets for religious instruction and other schooling. However, this initiative was not well received by teachers at the school. Being poorly paid, they refused to accept the additional labor without remuneration.

The pastor of the Church of Santa Dorotea in Trastevere, Anthony Brendani, offered Joseph two rooms just off of the parish sacristy and promised assistance in teaching, and when two other priests promised similar help, Calasanz, in 1597 (November 27), opened what was thought to be the first free public school in Europe.

On Christmas Day in 1598, the Tiber flooded its banks to historic levels, reaching an additional depth of nearly 20 m (65 ft) above its normal level. The devastation was widespread. Hundreds of the already poor families who lived along the river's banks were left homeless and without food. The death toll was estimated at about 2,000. Calasanz threw himself into the response, joining a religious fraternity dedicated to helping the poor, and began to help in the cleaning up and recovery of the city. In 1600, he opened his “Pious School” in the center of Rome and soon there were extensions, in response to growing demands for enrollment from students.

Pope Clement VIII began making an annual contribution and many others gave their financial support to the work so that in a short time Calasanz had about 1,000 children under his charge. In 1602, he rented a house near Sant'Andrea della Valle, commenced a community life with his assistants, and laid the foundation of the Order of the Pious Schools or Piarists. In 1610, Calasanz wrote the Documentum Princeps in which he laid out the fundamental principles of his educational philosophy. The text was accompanied by regulations for teachers and for pupils.

On September 15, 1616, the first public and free school in Frascati was started up on Calasanz's initiative. One year later, on March 6, 1617, Pope Paul V approved Calasanz's group as the Pauline Congregation of the Poor of the Mother of God of the Pious Schools, the first religious institute dedicated essentially to teaching, by his brief "Ad ea per quae." On March 25, 1617, he and his fourteen assistants received the Piarist habit and became the first members of the new congregation. The habits were paid for by the Cardinal Protector Justiniani, who with his own hands invested Joseph Calasanz in the chapel of his palace. They were the very first priests to have as their primary ministry teaching in elementary schools. Emphasising love, not fear, St. Joseph wrote: "if from the very earliest years, a child is instructed in both religion and letters, it can be reasonably hoped that his life will be happy."

While residing in Rome, Joseph endeavored to visit the seven principal churches of that city almost every evening, and also to honor the tombs of the Roman martyrs. During one of the city's many outbreaks of plague, a holy rivalry existed between him and St. Camillus in aiding the sick and in personally carrying away for burial the bodies of those who had been stricken. On account of his heroic patience and fortitude in the midst of trouble and persecution, he was called a marvel of Christian courage, a second Job. During the following years, Calasanz established Pious Schools in various parts of Europe. In October 1628 he was a guest of the Conti di Segni family in Poli and there, too, he established the Pious Schools. After convincing the pope of the need to approve a religious order with solemn vows dedicated exclusively to the education of youth, the congregation was raised to that status on November 18, 1621, by a papal brief of Pope Gregory XV, under the name of Ordo Clericorum Regularium Pauperum Matris Dei Scholarum Piarum (Order of Poor Clerics Regular of the Mother of God of the Pious Schools). The modern abbreviation "Sch. P." following the name of the Piarist stands for Scholarum Piarum, Latin for "of the Pious Schools". The Order's Constitutions were approved by Gregory XV 1621, and the order was granted all the privileges of the mendicant orders, Calasanz being recognised as superior general. The Order of the Pious Schools was thus the last of the religious Orders of solemn vows approved by the Church. The Piarists, as do many religious, profess vows of poverty, chastity, and obedience. In addition, according to the wishes of St. Joseph, members of the Order also profess a fourth vow to dedicate their lives to the education of youth.

== Educational ideas ==
The concept of free education for the poor was not exclusive to Calasanz. In the Duchy of Lorraine, a similar project was being undertaken simultaneously by the Augustinians Peter Fourier and Alix Le Clerc, whose educational heritage was carried to New France. As recognised by Ludwig von Pastor, Calasanz was the founder of the first free public school in modern Europe. In both cases, it was a revolutionary initiative, a radical break with the class privileges that kept the masses marginalised and in poverty. In the history of education, Calasanz is an educator of the poor, offering education free of charge to all classes of society, without discrimination.

Calasanz displayed the same moral courage, in his attitude to victims of the Inquisition, such as Galileo and Campanella, and in the acceptance of Jewish children in his schools, where they were treated with the same respect as other pupils. Similarly, Protestant pupils were enrolled in his schools in Germany. So great and universal was Calasanz's prestige that he was even asked by the Ottoman Empire to set up schools there, a request which he could not, to his regret, fulfill, due to a lack of teachers. He organised and systematised a method of educating primary school pupils through progressive levels or cycles, a system of vocational training, and a system of public secondary education.

In an era when no one else was interested in public education, Calasanz managed to set up schools with a highly complex structure. He was concerned with physical education and hygiene. He addressed the subject in various documents and requested school directors to monitor children's health.

Calasanz taught his students to read both in Latin and in the vernacular. While maintaining the study of Latin, he was a strong defender of vernacular languages, and had textbooks, including those used for teaching Latin, written in the vernacular. In that respect he was more advanced than his contemporaries.

Calasanz placed great emphasis on the teaching of mathematics. Training in mathematics and science was considered very important in his Pious Schools, both for pupils and teachers. But Calasanz's main concern was undoubtedly the moral and Christian education of his students. As both priest and educator, he considered education to be the best way of changing society. All his writing is imbued with his Christian ideals, and the constitutions and regulations of the Pious Schools were based on the same spirit. Calasanz created an ideal image of a Christian teacher and used it to train the teachers who worked with him.

Calasanz wrote a version of the prayer "The Crown of Twelve Stars," and he established continuous prayer in all his schools. Calasanz was the first educator to advocate the preventive method: it is better to anticipate mischievous behaviour than to punish it. This method was later developed by John Bosco, the founder of the Salesian schools. In terms of discipline, and contrary to the prevailing philosophy of his own and subsequent eras, Calasanz favored the mildest punishment possible. While believing that punishment was necessary in certain cases, he always preached moderation, love and kindness as the basis of any discipline.

== Relationship with Galileo and Campanella ==
At a time when humanistic studies ruled the roost, Calasanz sensed the importance of mathematics and science for the future and issued frequent instructions that mathematics and science should be taught in his schools and that his teachers should have a firmer grounding in those subjects. Calasanz was a friend of Galileo Galilei and sent some distinguished Piarists to study under the great scientist. He shared and defended his controversial view of the cosmos.

When Galileo fell into disgrace, Calasanz instructed members of his congregation to provide him with whatever assistance he needed and authorised the Piarists to continue studying mathematics and science with him. Unfortunately, those opposed to Calasanz and his work used the Piarists' support and assistance to Galileo as an excuse to attack them. Despite such attacks, Calasanz continued to support Galileo. When, in 1637, Galileo lost his sight, Calasanz ordered the Piarist Clemente Settimi to serve as his secretary. Calasanz brought the same understanding and sympathy that he had shown to Galileo to his friendship with the great philosopher Tommaso Campanella (1558–1639), one of the most profound and fertile minds of his time, producing famous philosophical work. Although he was highly controversial as well, Campanella maintained a strong and fruitful friendship with Calasanz.

The philosopher whose utopian visions proposed social reforms in which the education of the masses played an important part must have been a kindred spirit for Calasanz, who was already putting such utopian ideas into practice. Calasanz, with his courage and open-mindedness, invited the controversial thinker to Frascati to help teach philosophy to his teachers. Thus, Campanella, who had rallied to the support of Galileo, also came to the defense of Calasanz with his Liber Apologeticus.

== Death and legacy ==
His pedagogical practictioner idea of educating every child, his schools for the poor, his support of the heliocentric science of Galilei and his service towards children and youth all aroused the opposition of many among the governing classes in society and the ecclesiastical hierarchy. In 1642, as a result of an internal crisis in the congregations as well as outside intrigue and pressur, Calasanz was briefly held and interrogated by the Inquisition.

Problems was exacerbated, however, by Father Stefano Cherubini, originally headmaster of the Piarist school in Naples, who systematically sexually abuse the pupils in his care. Cherubini made no secret about some of his transgressions, and Calasanz came to know of them. Unfortunately for Calasanz as administrator of the Order, Cherubini was the son and the brother of powerful papal lawyers and no one wanted to offend the Cherubini family. Cherubini pointed out that if allegations of his abuse of his boys became public, actions would be taken to destroy the Order. Calasanz therefore promoted him, to get him away from the scene of the crime, citing only his luxurious diet and failure to attend prayers. However, he knew what Cherubini had really been up to, and he wrote that the sole aim of the plan was "to cover up this great shame in order that it does not come to the notice of our superiors".

Superiors in Rome found out but bowed to the same family ties that had bound Calasanz. Cherubini became visitor general for the Piarists. The Piarists became entangled in church politics and, partially because they were associated with Galileo, were opposed by the Jesuits, who were more orthodox in astronomy. (Galileo's views also involved atomism, and were thought to be heretical regarding transubstantiation.) The support for Cherubini was broad enough that in 1643, he was made superior general of the Order and the elderly Calasanz was pushed aside. Upon this appointment, Calasanz publicly documented Cherubini's long pattern of child molestation, a pattern that he had known about for years. Even this did not block Cherubini's appointment, but other members of the Order were indignant about it, although they may have objected to Cherubini's more overt shortcomings. With such dissension, the Holy See took the easy course of suppressing the Order. In 1646, it was deprived of its privileges by Pope Innocent X, but the order was restored ten years later by Pope Alexander VIII.

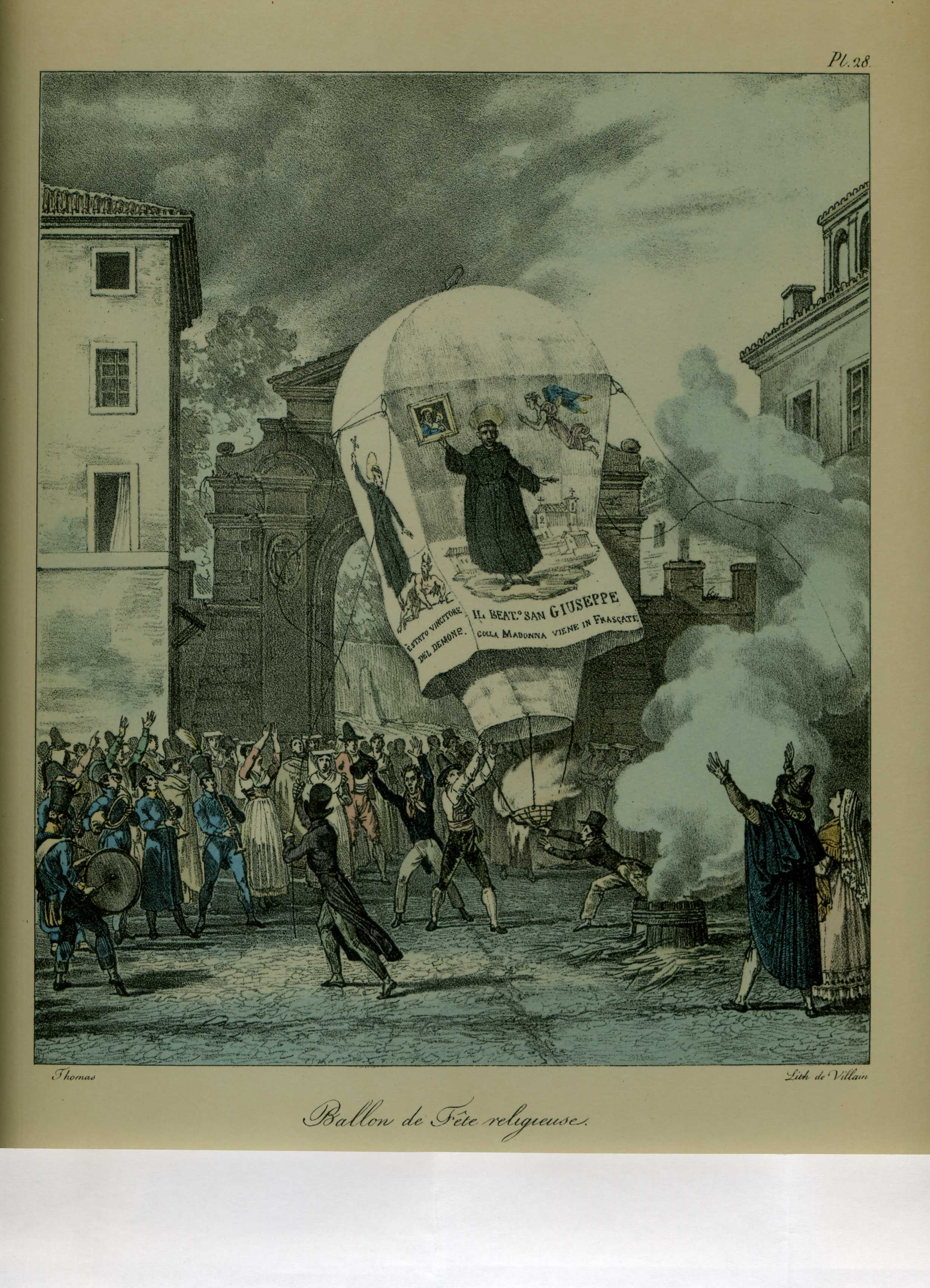
Religious holiday in Frascati: arrival of St Joseph Calasanz and the image of Our Lady – 1823

Calasanz always remained faithful to the Church and died August 25, 1648, at the age of 90, admired for his holiness and courage by his students, their families, his fellow Piarists, and the people of Rome. He was buried in the Church of San Pantaleo.

== Veneration ==
Eight years after his death, Pope Alexander VII cleared the name of the Pious Schools. Joseph Calasanz was beatified on August 7, 1748, by Pope Benedict XIV. He was later canonised by Pope Clement XIII on July 16, 1767.

On August 13, 1948, Pope Pius XII declared him to be the "Universal Patron of all Christian popular schools in the world".

His heart and tongue are conserved incorrupt in a devotional chapel in the Piarist motherhouse in Rome.

Pope John Paul II affirmed that Saint Joseph Calasanz took as a model Christ, and he tried to transmit to youth, besides the profane sciences, the wisdom of the Gospel, teaching them to grasp the loving harmony of God.

Calasanz's liturgical feast day has been celebrated on August 25, the day of his death, in the General Roman Calendar since 1969. The 1769 to 1969 editions of that calendar placed it on August 27, which was then the nearest free day to August 25.

Parishes are dedicated to St. Joseph Calasanctius in Jefferson, Ohio and North Battleford, Saskatchewan. Granada, Spain has a parish church, Parroquia de San José de Calasanz, dedicated to him. There is also the Church of San Jose de Calasanz in Lockney, Texas. Calasanz is also commemorated in a number of schools around the world, named after him and overseen by the Piarists and other religious institutes that have him as their patron saint.

Because August 25 falls during summer vacation in many schools, the Order in its official "Calendarium Ordinis" celebrates November 27 as the "Patrocinium" of St. Joseph Calasanz. It is a day that teachers and students can especially honor him. That date was chosen in honor of the day he opened his first free public school in 1597.

== See also ==
- Piarists
- Pious Workers of St. Joseph Calasanctius of the Mother of God, named after him
- Peter Fourier
- Alix Le Clerc

== Sources ==
- Josep Domènech i Mira, Joseph Calasanz (1557–1648), "Prospects: Quarterly Review of Comparative Education. Paris, UNESCO, XXVII: 2, 327–339. .
- "Calendarium Ordinis Scholarum Piarum. Rome, 2018.
