= Mazak =

Mazak may refer to:

- Mazak, former brand name for Zamak, a zinc-based alloy
- Alberich Mazak (1609–1661), Czech-Austrian composer
- Yamazaki Mazak Corporation, Japanese machine tool builder

== See also ==
- Mazaaq, 1975 Indian film
