= Stiepel Priory =

Monastery in Bochum, Germany

Coordinates: 51°25′54.36″N 7°13′43.23″E

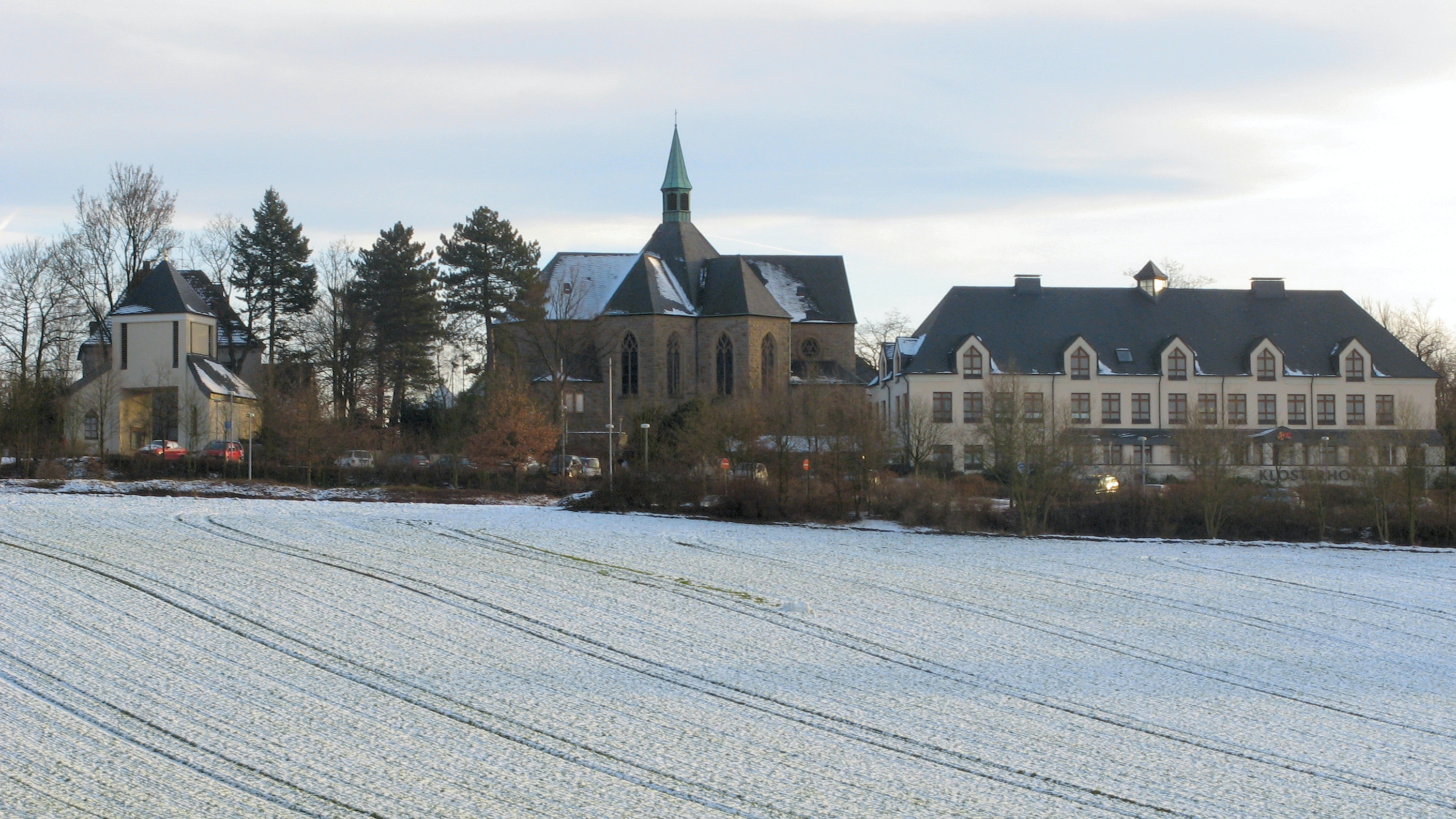

Stiepel Priory is a Cistercian monastery in Stiepel in Bochum, North Rhine-Westphalia, Germany.

It was founded in 1988 at the instigation of Franz Hengsbach, first Bishop of the Diocese of the Ruhr. It is a dependent house of Heiligenkreuz Abbey in Austria.

The priory church is also a Marian pilgrimage site to Our Lady of Sorrows.

== Priors and Subpriors ==
From	To	Prior	Subprior
1 September 1988	30 September 2001	Beda Zilch	Christian Feurstein
1 October 2001	30 September 2004	Christian Feurstein	Jakobus Kempkes
1 October 2004	10 February 2011	Maximilian Heim	Jakobus Kempkes
10 February 2011	12 June 2014	Primin Holzschuh	Jakobus Kempkes
13 June 2014	1 February 2018	Primin Holzschuh	Andreas Wüller
2 February 2018	30 November 2019	Andreas Wüller	Gabriel Chumacera
30 November 2019		Maurus Zerb	Rupert Fetsch
