= The Cistercian Monks of Stift Heiligenkreuz =

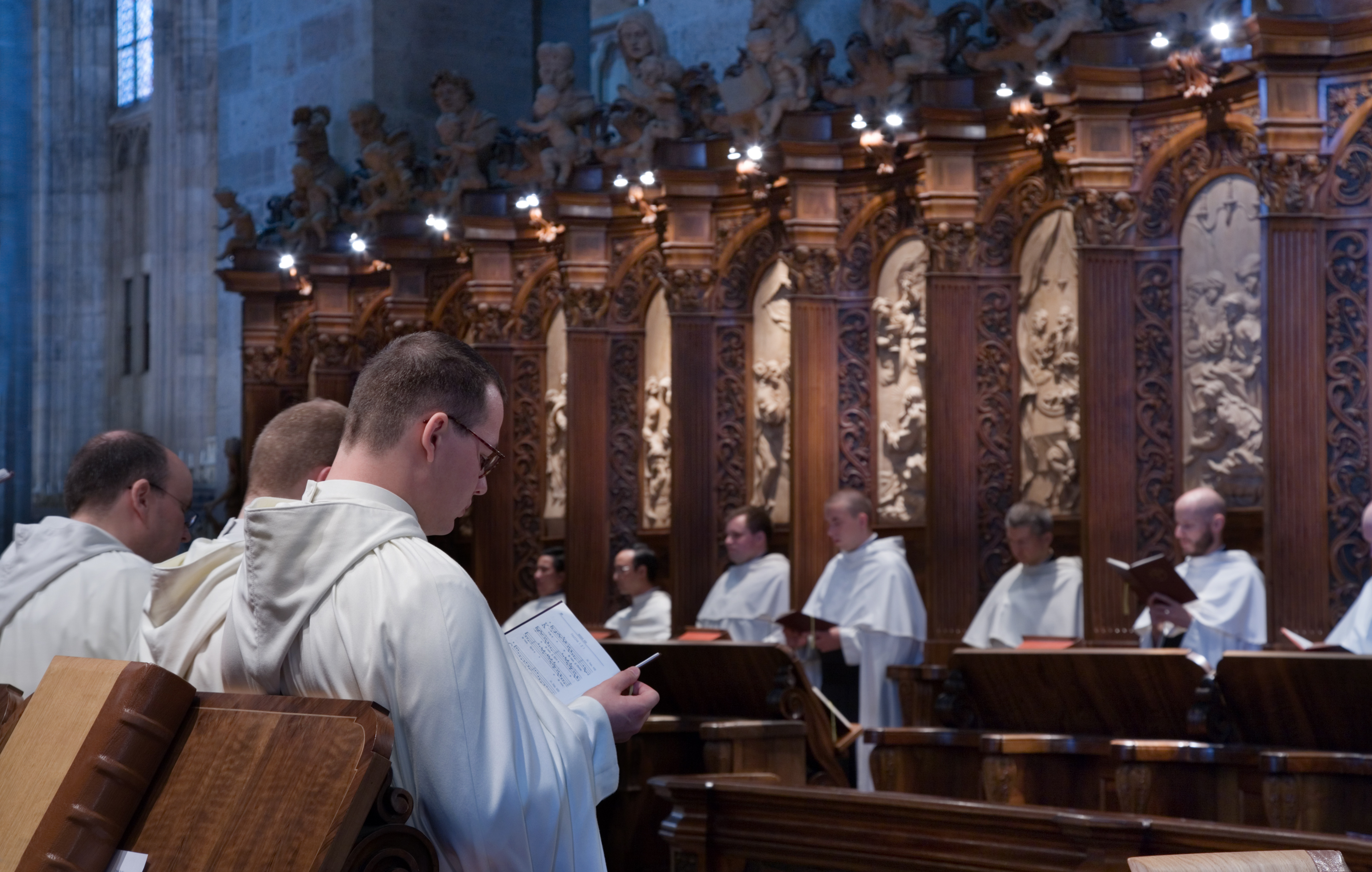
- Choir of monks during the liturgy in the monastery church of the abbey Heiligenkreuz

Background information
- Origin: Heiligenkreuz, Austria
- Genres: Church music, Gregorian chant
- Years active: 2007 – present
- Labels: Universal Music, UCJ Music, London Recordings, Decca, Oehms Classics, Preiser Records, Obsculta Music

The Cistercian Monks of Stift Heiligenkreuz is the artistic name of the Choralschola of Cistercian monks from the Lower Austrian abbey Heiligenkreuz who have so far recorded six CDs of Gregorian chant that have attracted the attention of European and world music public. The names of individual singers have never been specifically published because monks see themselves primarily as people dedicated to God who sing for religious and non-professional reasons.

The Cistercians of the Heiligenkreuz abbey founded in 2011 their own record label Obsculta Music and have received prestigious awards and recognitions for their public musical achievements. Their first music album Chant: Music for Paradise was released by Universal Music in 2008 (under this name the album was released in Europe, while in the rest of the world it was released under the title Chant: Music for the Soul). Just this album achieved several gold and platinum music recording certifications soon after its release and also won the German music award ECHO Klassik in the category "Bestseller of the Year" in 2009.

== Discography ==
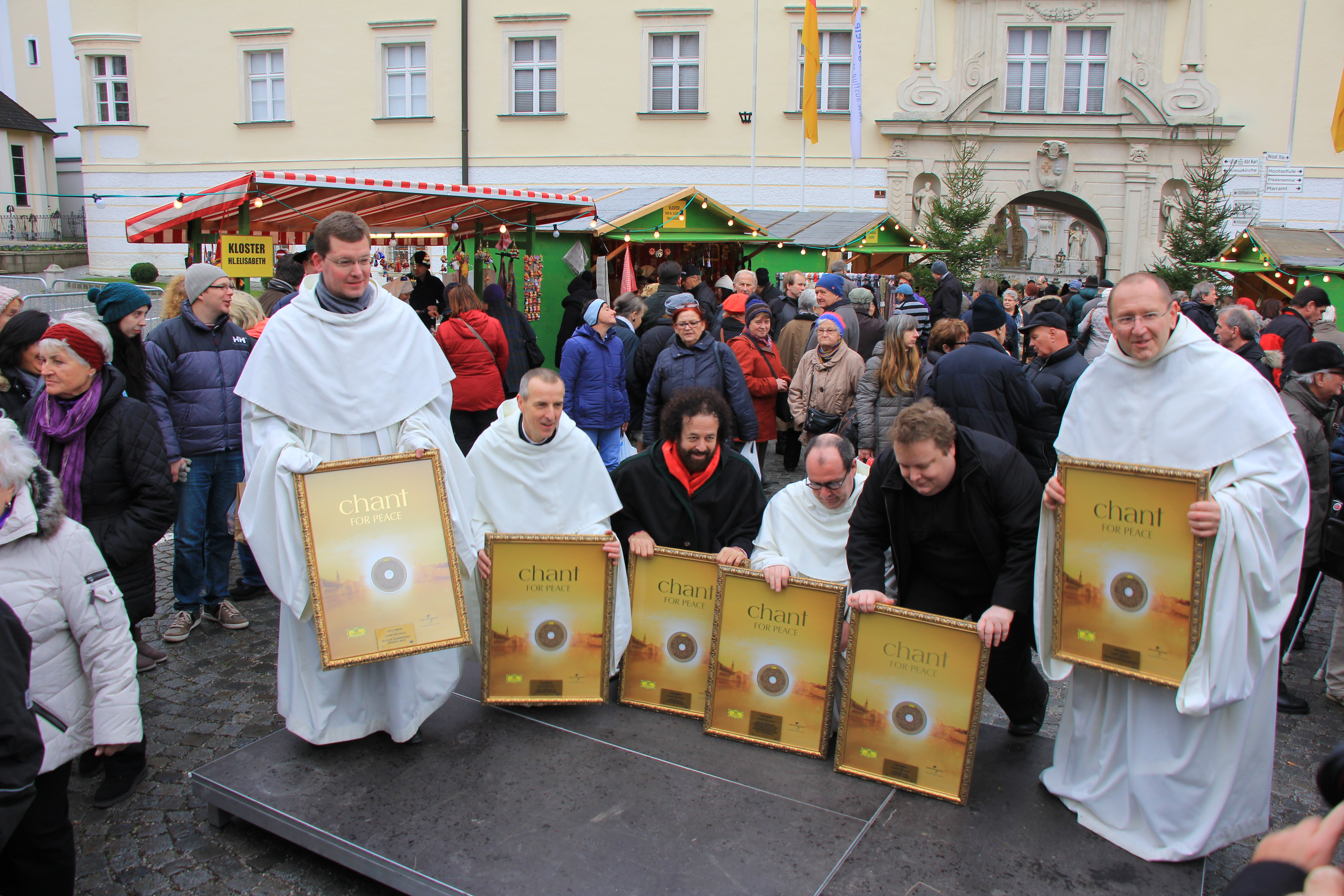
Award "Golden record" to the Cistercians in Heiligenkreuz for the album Chant for Peace (2015)

- 2008 – Chant: Music for Paradise, UCJ Music / Universal Music, CD 4766774 / Chant: Music for the Soul, London – Decca, CD B0011489-02
- 2008 – Chant: Music for Paradise, Universal Music / UCJ Music, 2xCD 4766977
- 2010 – Best of Gregorian Chant (compilation album): Zisterzienser Mönche vom Stift Heiligenkreuz, Choralschola des Klosters Santo Domingo de Silos u.a., Deutsche Grammophon, CD 480 3408
- 2011 – Chant: Amor et Passio, Obsculta Music / Preiser Records, CD 91200
- 2011 – VESPERÆ. Baroque Vespers at Stift Heiligenkreuz – Ensemble dolce risonanza, Florian Wieninger & The Cistercian Monks of Stift Heiligenkreuz, Oehms Classics, CD 826
- 2012 – Chant: Stabat Mater, Obsculta Music, CD OM 0003
- 2012 – Chant: Missa Latina, Obsculta Music, CD OM 0002
- 2014 – Chant: Into the Light, Obsculta Music, CD OSM 0004
- 2015 – Chant for Peace, Deutsche Grammophon, CD 479 4709 GH

== Awards and honors ==
- 2008 – Golden record for the album Chant: Music for Paradise in Belgium United Kingdom, Germany and Poland
- 2008 – Platinum record in Netherlands for the album Chant: Music for Paradise
- 2008 – Media Award (in German: "Medienpreis") of the Lower Austrian Tourism Award 2008
- 2009 – Nomination for the Echo Music Prize in the category "Newcomer international"
- 2009 – Double Platinum record in Poland for the album Chant: Music for Paradise
- 2009 – ECHO Klassik in the category "Bestseller of the Year" for the album Chant: Music for Paradise
