= Our Lady of Lourdes Grotto, Heiligenkreuz =

Lourdes Grotto, Heiligenkreuz

Coordinates: 48.05486°N 16.12958°E

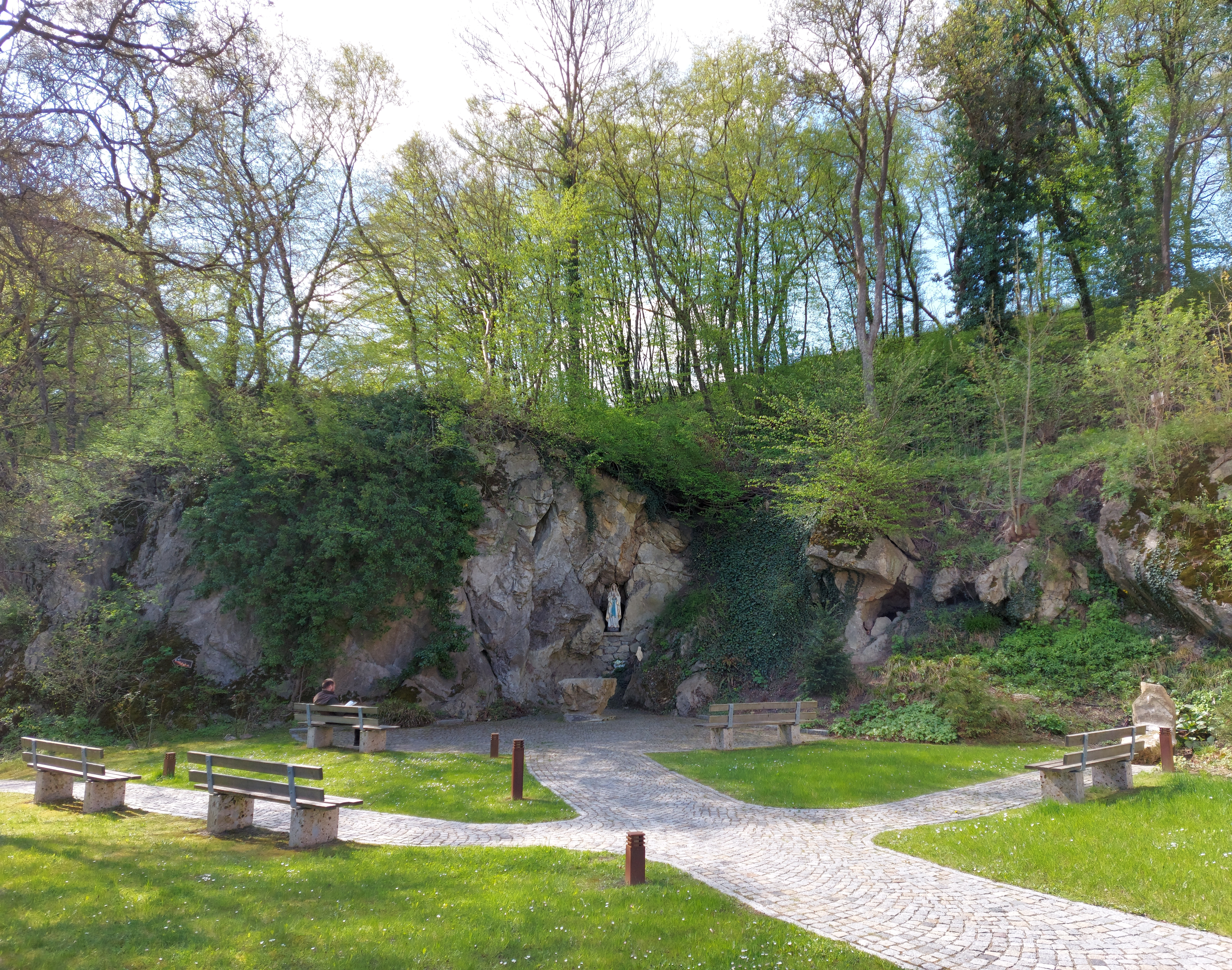
Our Lady of Lourdes Grotto in Heiligenkreuz (Lower Austria)

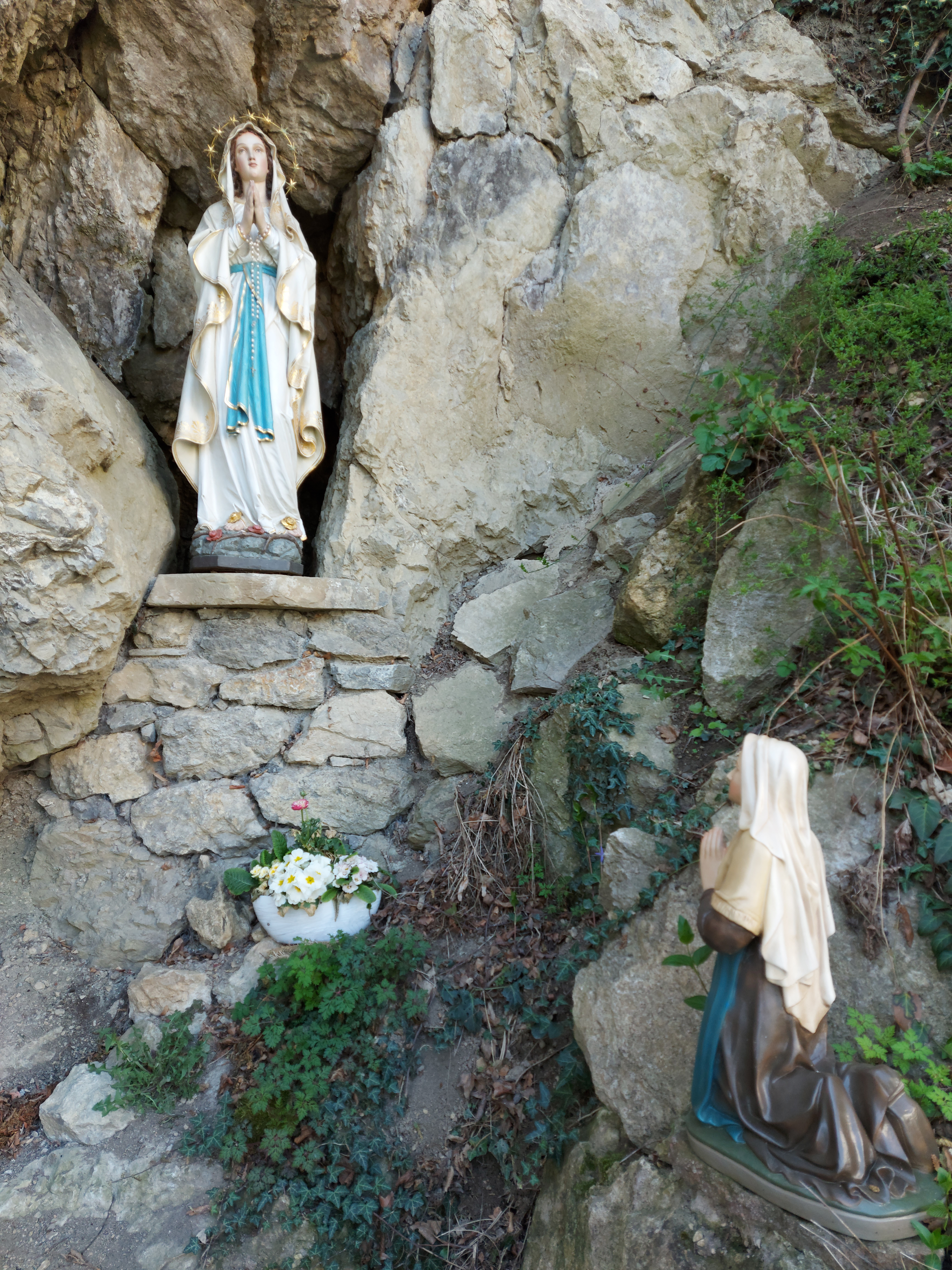
Our Lady of Lourdes and St. Bernadette

The Our Lady of Lourdes Grotto in Heiligenkreuz is a Lourdes grotto in Heiligenkreuz, a municipality in the Vienna Woods in the district of Baden near Vienna, which was created in 2017 by the Heiligenkreuz Abbey as a religious monument in honor of the Blessed Virgin Mary. Like all similar grottoes of Our Lady of Lourdes around the world, it is reminiscent of the world-famous grotto of the apparition of the Virgin Mary in the French pilgrimage town of Lourdes.

== Location and history ==
Heiligenkreuz lies on the Via Sacra pilgrimage route from Vienna to Austria's national Marian shrine Mariazell, and has always been a stopping point of many pilgrims. The Cistercians of Heiligenkreuz Abbey say about the veneration of Mary, the Mother of God: "Where Mary is worshiped and prayed to, faith takes root and becomes alive and strong. Where Mary is loved, the Church is loved". That is why a special place for pilgrims – the Cave of Our Lady of Lourdes – was created in the immediate vicinity of Heiligenkreuz Abbey. This Marian grotto was built in the summer of 2017 in a natural rock next to the Sattelbach stream, near the medieval granary, and was solemnly consecrated on the eve of the Assumption of Mary (14 August) by the Apostolic Nuncio in Austria, archbishop Peter Stephan Zurbriggen. One statue of the Madonna of Lourdes from the beginning of the 20th century, a gift to the Heiligenkreuz Abbey, has been renovated and placed in a natural hollow of the rock, with an altar cut from the same stone and placed in front of it. Since August 2020, a small statue of Saint Bernadette Soubirous, donated by an unidentified benefactor, has also been part of the Grotto of Our Lady of Lourdes in Heiligenkreuz: the abbot of Lilienfeld Abbey Pius Martin Maurer blessed it during the great candlelight procession on 14 August 2020.

Even though Mary is with God, she still wants to be among us. The recognized places of Marian apparitions such as Lourdes and Fátima point to Mary's motherly closeness and love.

— Maximilian Heim OCist

Let us be guided by Mary, so that through her we may become more like Jesus. Let us allow ourselves to be led more and more by the Immaculata wherever and however she wants us, so that in fulfillment of our religious duties we may bring all people closer to her love.

— Maximilian Kolbe OFMConv

Through Mary and with Mary, the Holy Spirit works salvation for mankind.

— Bernhard Vošicky OCist

Where Mary is, there is the archetype of total surrender and the following of Christ. Where Mary is, there is the Pentecostal blast of the Holy Spirit, there is awakening and authentic renewal.

— Pope Benedict XVI
