= Leopold Maximilian von Firmian =

Austrian bishop (1766–1831)

His Grace Leopold Maximilian von Firmian
- Prince-Archbishop of Vienna
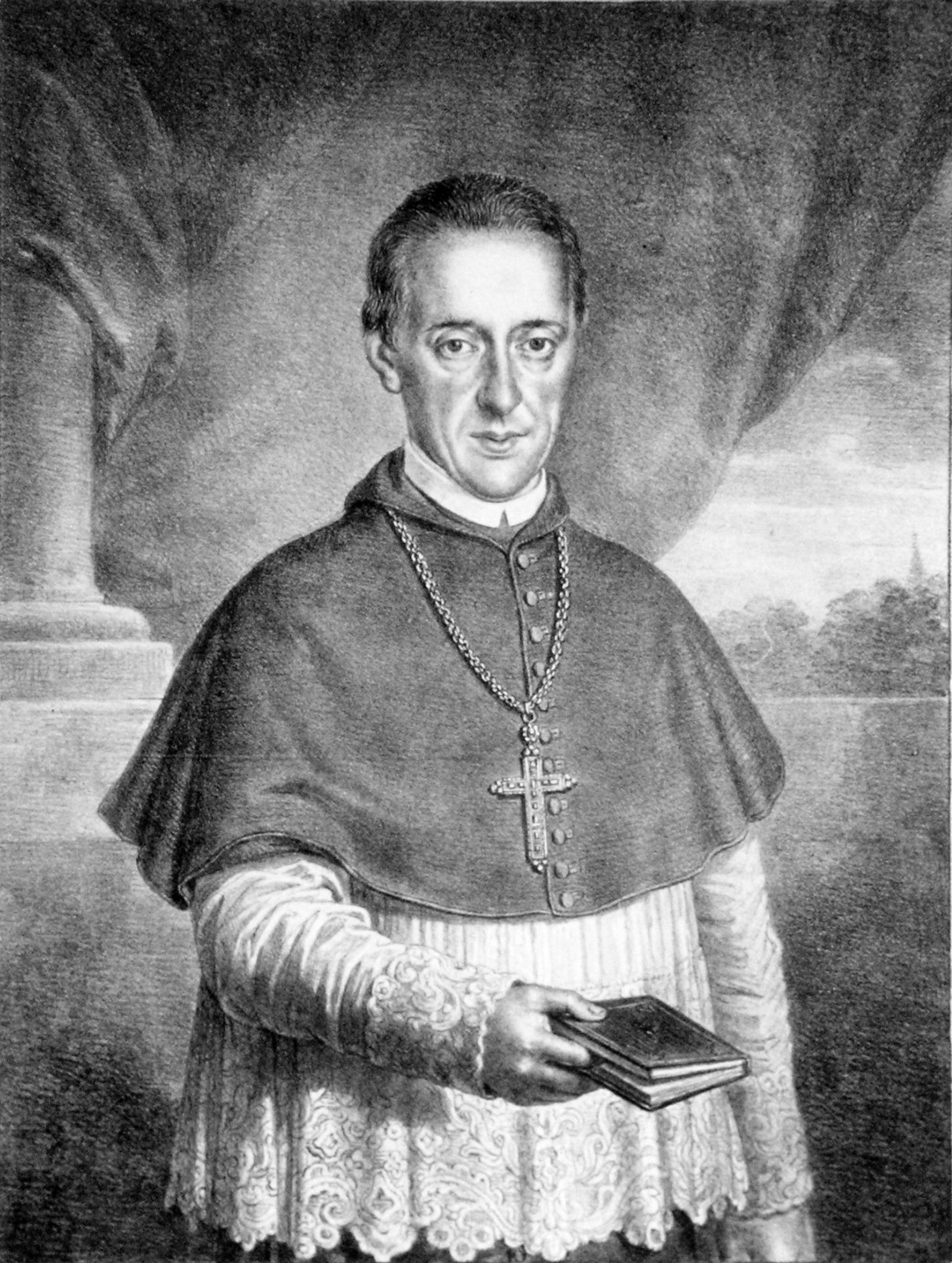
- Engraving by Josef Lanzedelly, 1830
- Church: Roman Catholic Church
- Archdiocese: Vienna
- See: St. Stephen's Cathedral
- Installed: 19 April 1822
- Term ended: 29 November 1831
- Predecessor: Sigismund Anton von Hohenwart
- Successor: Vinzenz Eduard Milde
- Other posts: Titular Bishop of Tiberias (1797–1800); Bishop of Lavant (1800–22)

Personal details
- Born: 11 October 1766 Trento, Bishopric of Trent
- Died: 29 November 1831 (aged 65) Vienna, Austrian Empire
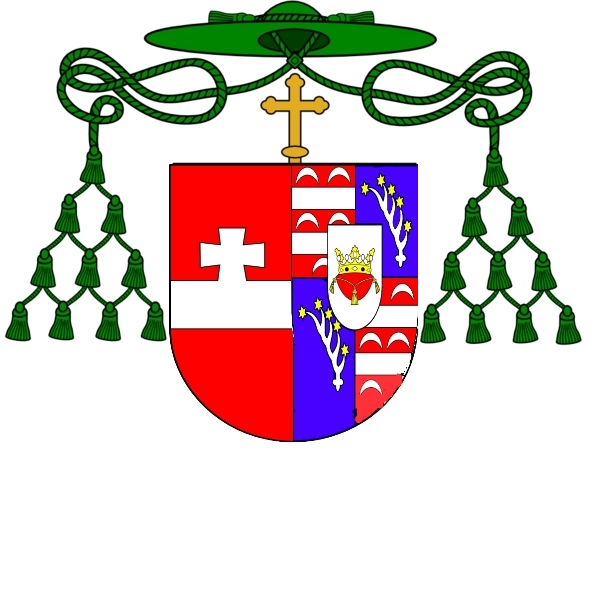
- Coat of arms

Leopold Maximilian Graf von Firmian (11 October 1766, Trento – 29 November 1831, Vienna) was Auxiliary Bishop in Passau and Titular Bishop of Tiberias from 1797, from 1800 to 1816 Bishop of Lavant, was appointed Archbishop of Salzburg in 1816, but in 1818 was only confirmed as administrator of the Archdiocese of Salzburg. From 1822 to 1831, he was Prince-Archbishop of Vienna.

== Biography ==
Coming from the Tyrolean nobility of Firmian, he was canon of Salzburg and Passau in 1780. On 23 September 1792, he was ordained a priest in Salzburg.

On 24 July 1797, he was appointed Auxiliary Bishop in Passau and Titular Bishop of Tiberias. The episcopal consecration was bestowed upon him on 5 November 1797 by the Bishop of Passau, Leopold Leonhard von Thun.

In 1800, he was appointed Bishop of Lavant and, in 1816, Archbishop of Salzburg. Because of the unclear political conditions, he was only confirmed in 1818 as the diocesan administrator. On 18 January 1822, Emperor Francis I appointed him Archbishop of Vienna, the Papal confirmation took place on 19 April of the same year.

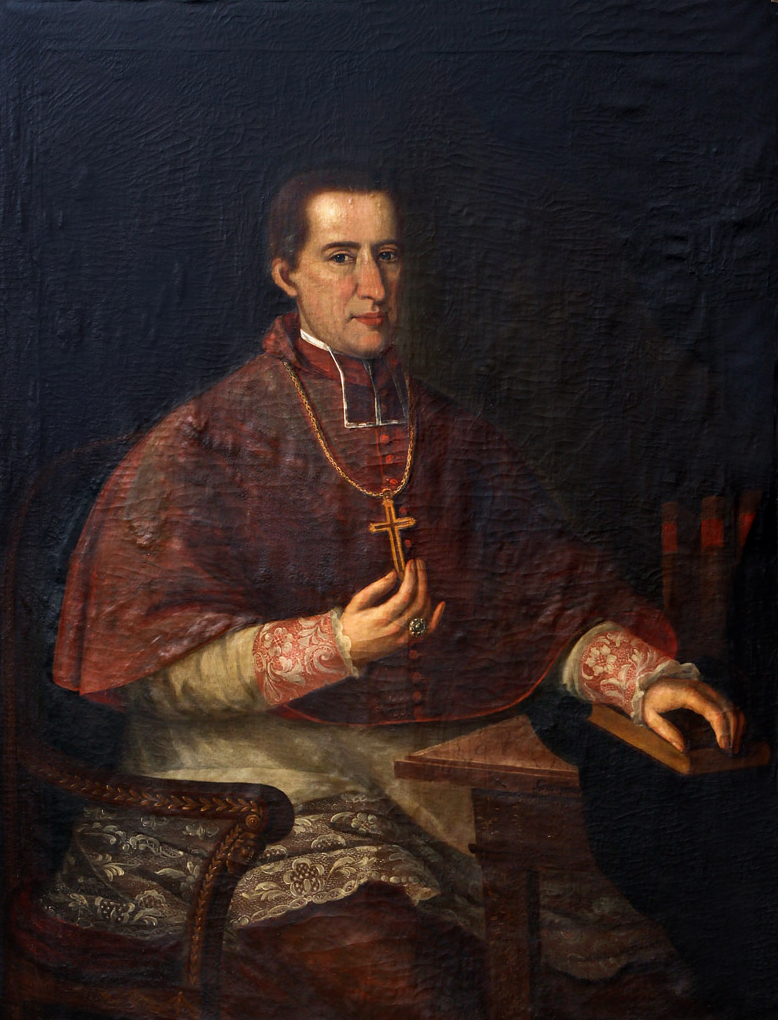
Portrait of Leopold Maximilian von Firmian, Bishop of Lavant (1800–22)

He is portrayed as a praisewelling church prince who fulfilled the will of the Emperor in his diocese and allowed the interventions of late Josephinism in church life. He strove for the church song and had in 1824 created a directory of all songs that were sung in the parishes. During his tenure came the founding of the Leopoldine Society of the Austrian Empire in support of the American missions on 13 May 1829.

In 1894, Firmiangasse in Vienna-Hietzing was named after him.

== Bibliography ==
- Franz Loidl: Geschichte des Erzbistums Wien. Herold, Wien u. a. 1983, ISBN 3-7008-0223-4.
- Ernst Tomek: Kirchengeschichte Österreichs. Band 3: Das Zeitalter der Aufklärung und des Absolutismus. Tyrolia, Innsbruck u. a. 1959.
- Josef Wodka: Kirche in Österreich. Wegweiser durch ihre Geschichte. Herder, Wien 1959.
