= Leopoldine Society =

The Leopoldine Society was an organization established in Vienna for the purpose of aiding Catholic missions in North America. Based on the French model of the Society for the Propagation of the Faith, the Leopoldine Society was founded in 1829 in Vienna, and named in memory of the Emperor's daughter.

The society began with an initiative of Bishop Fenwick of Cincinnati, who sent Frederick Rese, his vicar-general, to Europe to recruit German priests to minister to the German-speaking Catholics who had emigrated to Ohio. Rese, a former cavalryman under Field Marshal Blücher, stimulated great interest with his accounts of life in the New World. His requests for assistance were favorably received. Members were requested to support the missions through prayer and alms. A system was set up to arrange and coordinate the collection of regular small contributions that would be forwarded to the American missions. The interest generated by the society had a collateral effect of increasing the number of priests interested in ministering in America.

== History ==
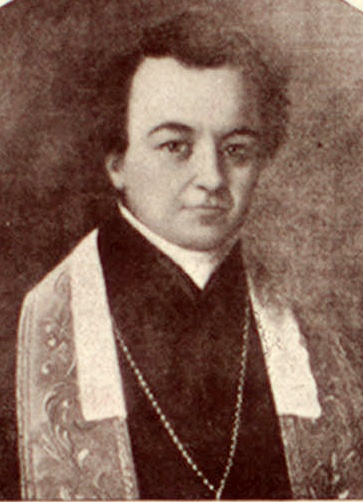
Friedrich Reese

When the Society for the Propagation of the Faith was founded in Lyons, in 1822, it did not spread beyond the French borders for a considerable time. Other nations were not unwilling to cooperate, but were deliberating whether to start a similar society of their own or to join the one already in existence. At this time, in 1827, Bishop Edward Fenwick of Cincinnati, Ohio sent his vicar-general, Father Rese, to Europe to recruit German priests and to obtain assistance for his diocese.

Rese was from Hanover, and before becoming a priest, had served as a cavalryman in the 1815 Battle of Waterloo under command of Field Marshal Blücher. He traveled to Munich and Regensburg and reached Vienna in the latter part of 1828. His accounts stimulated interest in the American missions in those with whom he came in contact. His descriptions of the New World, the scarcity of priests, and the prevailing poverty of the missions awoke a general public interest in the welfare of the American missions.

To strengthen this feeling and encourage the formation of a society similar to the French society Rese published a description of the Roman Catholic Archdiocese of Cincinnati (Abriss der Geschichte des Bisthums Cincinnati in Nord-America, Vienna, 1829), an excerpt from Father Stephen Badin's work. The Archbishop of Vienna, Leopold Maximilian Graf von Firmian, was so well disposed towards this undertaking that he brought it to the notice of the imperial family. Father Rese was granted an audience with the emperor, whose brother, Archduke Rudolf von Habsburg-Lothringen, Cardinal Archbishop of Olmutz, assumed the protectorate of the missionary work.

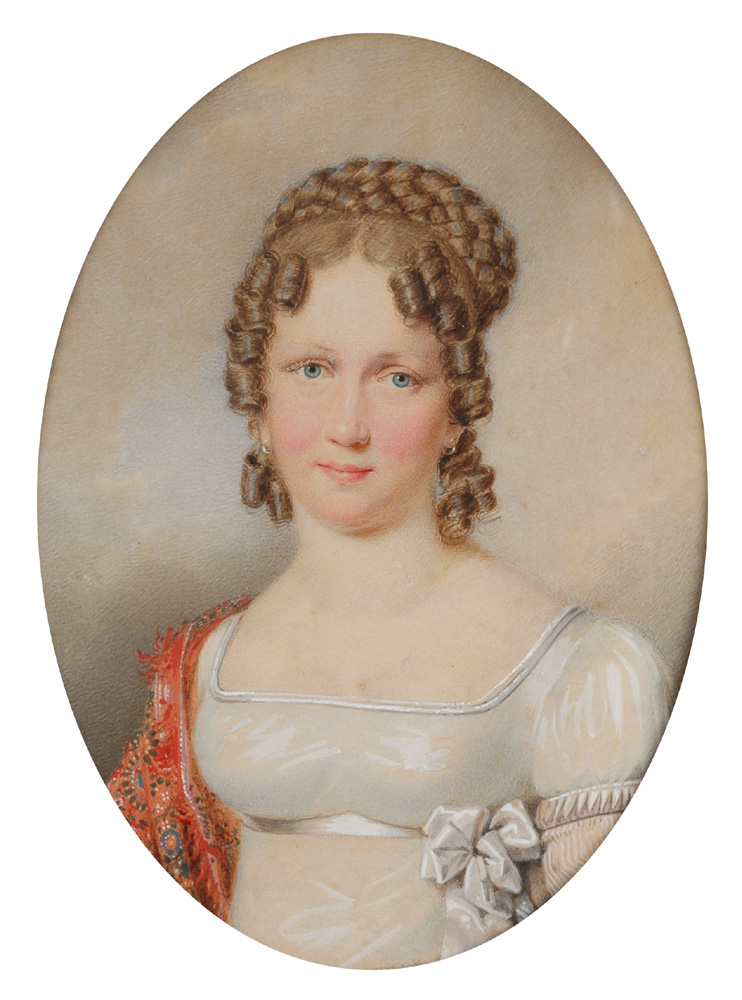
Maria Leopoldina of Austria

Next, the sanction of the Church was obtained. Pope Leo XII in the Papal Bull Quamquam plura sint, dated 30 Jan., 1829, approved of the nascent society. Meanwhile, the founders were busying themselves with the internal workings of the society. A public meeting was held on 13 March 1829, at the archiepiscopal palace. Canon Joseph Pletz, of the Metropolitan Church of St. Stephen, spoke on the propagation of the Gospel and what he saw as its civilizing influences upon the nations of the world. A month later, 15 April 1829, the statutes were adopted. These were drawn up much after the pattern of the French society. The only divergent points which need be mentioned were that the society was to be known as the Leopoldine Society -- Leopoldinenstiftung—to perpetuate the memory of the Maria Leopoldina of Austria, -Empress of Brazil, a favourite daughter of Francis II, Holy Roman Emperor and wife of Pedro I of Brazil; and that the society should exist only in Austria-Hungary. On 13 May 1829, the first executive session was held. A pamphlet was designed and in it incorporated the oration of Canon Pletz together with the statutes and the corresponding regulations. The brochure was translated into all the languages spoken in the monarchy. The head office was established in the Dominican monastery and Herr Anton Carl Lichtenberg became its first actuary and Dr. Caspar Wagner its treasurer.

== Membership ==
Membership in the Society was entirely voluntary. "As, however, everyone is free to enroll himself in this society, he may also leave it at pleasure." Members pledged to pray one Pater, one Ave, and the invocation "St. Leonard pray for us," daily, and to make weekly a small contributions of alms for the American missions. As a religious institution, the Society took as its patroness Our Lady of the Immaculate Conception, and celebrated both the Feast of the Immaculate Conception and that of St. Leopold Marchion, the patron saint of Maria Leopoldina. Furthermore, each year on December 11, the anniversary of her death, the Society would arrange for a solemn Mass for the repose of her soul and the souls of all the deceased patrons and benefactors of the Society.

Five kreuzers a week—about two cents—was a small contribution; however, little by little the fund commenced to swell so that from July to October, 1830, the collection amounted to $19,930. On 30 April 1830, a first draft of $10,256.04 was sent to Bishop Fenwick and four months later a second one of $5200, "to afford ample help and not to deal out the money in small bits and give relief practically to nobody".

The arrival of large sums from abroad provoked a reaction in some quarters. Samuel Morse believed that the Austrian government and Catholic aid organizations were subsidizing Catholic immigration to the United States in order to gain control of the country.

The general interest awakened by the society for the American missions not only brought out funds but donations of church utensils, Mass paraphernalia, paintings, statuary, etc. These objects were often donated by members of the imperial house. Directly due to the society were many vocations to the missions from among the priesthood. First amongst these was Frederic Baraga, afterwards Bishop of Marquette. His example was followed by John Neumann (afterwards Bishop of Philadelphia), Hatscher, Sanderl, Viszoczky, Belleis, Pisbach, Hammer, Kundeck, Cvitkovich, Schuh, Levic, Pirec, Skolla, Godec, Krutil, Veranek, Burg, Buchmayr, Bayer, Hasslinger, Count Coudenhove, Mark (afterwards Bishop of Marquette), Skopec, Etschmann, and many others—all of whom entered the missions before 1850.

The beneficiaries of the society were principally the dioceses in the United States. Among the older ones Cincinnati has been most helped, but St. Louis, Bardstown, Charleston, Philadelphia, Baltimore, Mobile, Boston, Detroit, New York, New Orleans, Nashville, Dubuque, Natchez, Vincennes, Richmond, Pittsburg, Chicago, St. Paul, Hartford, Milwaukee, Marquette, Galveston, Little Rock, received generous support. It spent upon the American Catholic missions, from 1830 to 1910, the sum of 3,402,211 kronen (about 680,500 dollars). The contributions chiefly come from the Austrian emperor, the Dioceses of Vienna, Sankt Pölten, Brun, Seckau, Prague, Königgrätz. Official reports, Berichte der Leopoldinen Stiftung, appeared, detailing the struggles and successes of the American missions and missionaries.
