= Heiligenkreuz Abbey =

Monastery in Heiligenkreuz, Austria

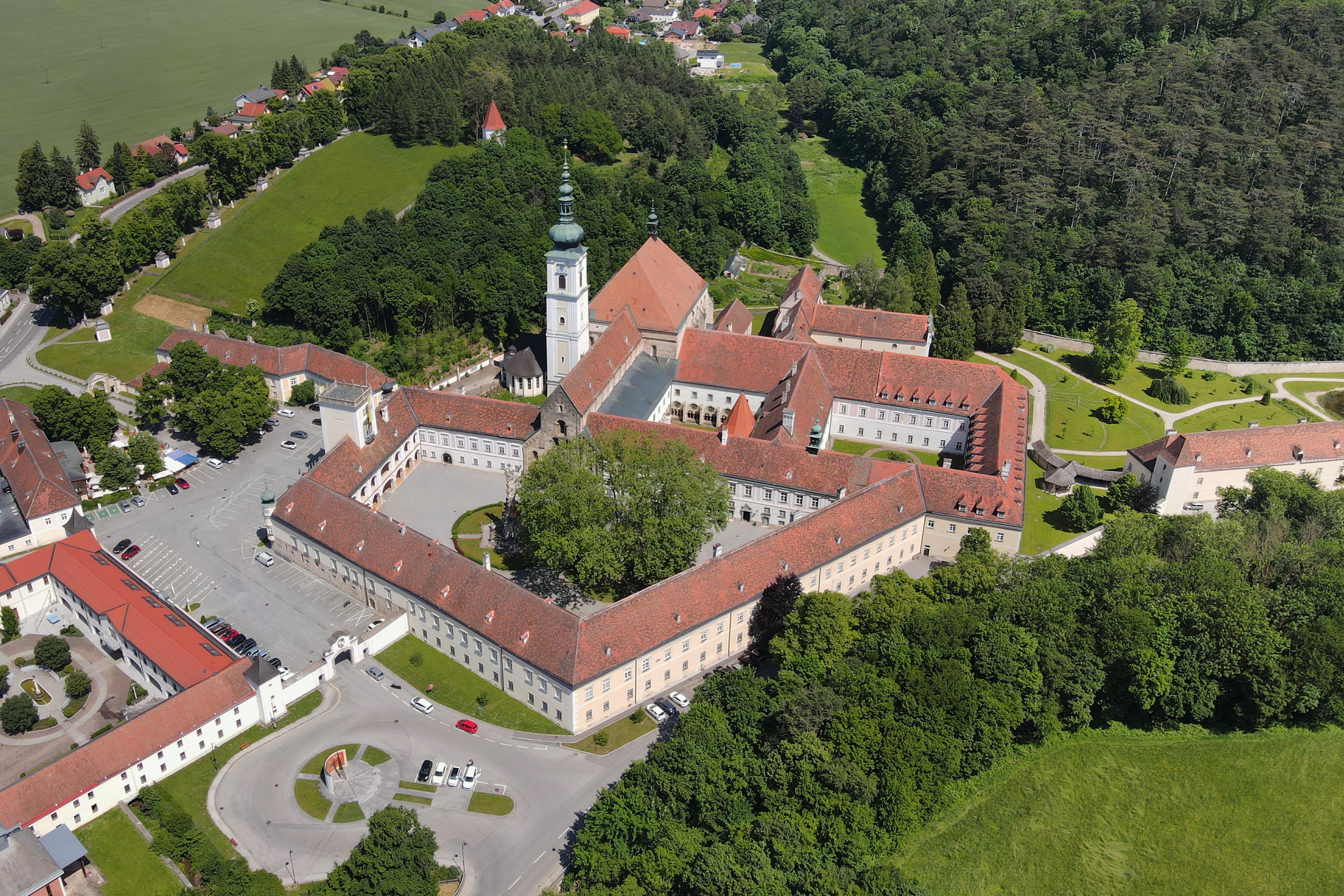
- Aerial view of Heiligenkreuz Abbey

- Location within Austria Location within Lower Austria

Religion
- Affiliation: Roman Catholic Church
- Ecclesiastical or organisational status: Abbey
- Leadership: Maximilian Heim
- Year consecrated: Abbey Church (1187); Monastery complex (1240)
- Status: Active
- Relics: True Cross, Crown of thorns, Otto of Freising

Location
- Location: Heiligenkreuz, Lower Austria
- Coordinates: 48.05510°N 16.13122°E

Architecture
- Architect: Giovanni Giuliani
- Type: Abbey
- Style: Cistercian, Gothic, Romanesque
- Founder: Leopold III, Margrave of Austria
- Groundbreaking: 11 September 1133

Website
- www.stift-heiligenkreuz.org

Heiligenkreuz Abbey (German: Stift Heiligenkreuz, lit. 'Abbey of the Holy Cross') is a Cistercian monastery in the village of Heiligenkreuz in the southern part of the Vienna woods, c. 13 km north-west of Baden in Lower Austria. It is the oldest continuously occupied Cistercian monastery in the world.

== History ==
Arms of the abbey

The monastery was founded in 1133 by Margrave St. Leopold III of Austria, at the request of his son Otto, soon to be abbot of the Cistercian monastery of Morimond in Burgundy and afterwards Bishop of Freising. Its first twelve monks together with their abbot, Gottschalk, came from Morimond at the request of Leopold III. The date of consecration was 11 September 1133. They called their abbey Heiligenkreuz (Holy Cross) as a sign of their devotion to redemption by the Cross.

On 31 May 1188 Leopold V of Austria presented the abbey with a relic of the True Cross, which is still to be seen and since 1983 is exhibited in the chapel of the Holy Cross. This relic was a present from Baldwin IV of Jerusalem, King of Jerusalem to duke Leopold V in 1182.

Heiligenkreuz was richly endowed by the founder's family, the Babenberg dynasty, and was active in the foundation of many daughter-houses.

The following Cistercian monasteries were founded by Heiligenkreuz:

- Zwettl Abbey in Lower Austria in 1138 (still extant);
- Czikador in Hungary in 1142 (dissolved in 1526);
- Baumgartenberg in Upper Austria in 1142 (dissolved in 1784);
- Marienberg in what is today Burgenland in 1194 (dissolved in 1526);
- Lilienfeld Abbey in Lower Austria in 1206 (still extant);
- Sancta Corona, known in Czech as Zlatá Koruna, in Bohemia in 1263 (dissolved in 1785);
- Neuberg in Styria in 1327 (dissolved in 1785).
- More recently, in 1988, Heiligenkreuz founded Stiepel Priory at Bochum-Stiepel in the Ruhrgebiet.
- Furthermore, in the 1990s the monastery gave substantial support for re-founding Vyšší Brod Monastery in the Czech Republic.

During the 15th and 16th centuries the abbey was often endangered by epidemics, floods, and fires. It suffered severely during the Turkish wars of 1529 and 1683. In the latter, Turkish soldiers burnt down much of the abbey precinct, which was rebuilt on a larger scale in the Baroque style under Abbot Klemens Schäfer.

Heiligenkreuz abbots were often noted for their piety and learning. In 1734 the Abbey of St. Gotthard in Hungary was ceded to Heiligenkreuz by Emperor Charles VI. In the late 1800s, it was united with the Hungarian Zirc Abbey. The monastery of Neukloster at Wiener-Neustadt was joined to Heiligenkreuz in 1881.

Heiligenkreuz was spared dissolution under Emperor Joseph II. Although the National Socialists planned its dissolution in the Third Reich, this plan was not carried out. Abbot Karl Braunstorfer of Heiligenkreuz was a Council Father at the Second Vatican Council.

The abbey has been an important Austrian centre for music for more than 800 years. Many manuscripts have been found at this monastery, most notably those of Alberich Mazak (1609–1661). Today it is also popularly known for a 2008 recording of Gregorian chant: "Chant: Music For Paradise". Other recordings followed.

== Abbey and church ==
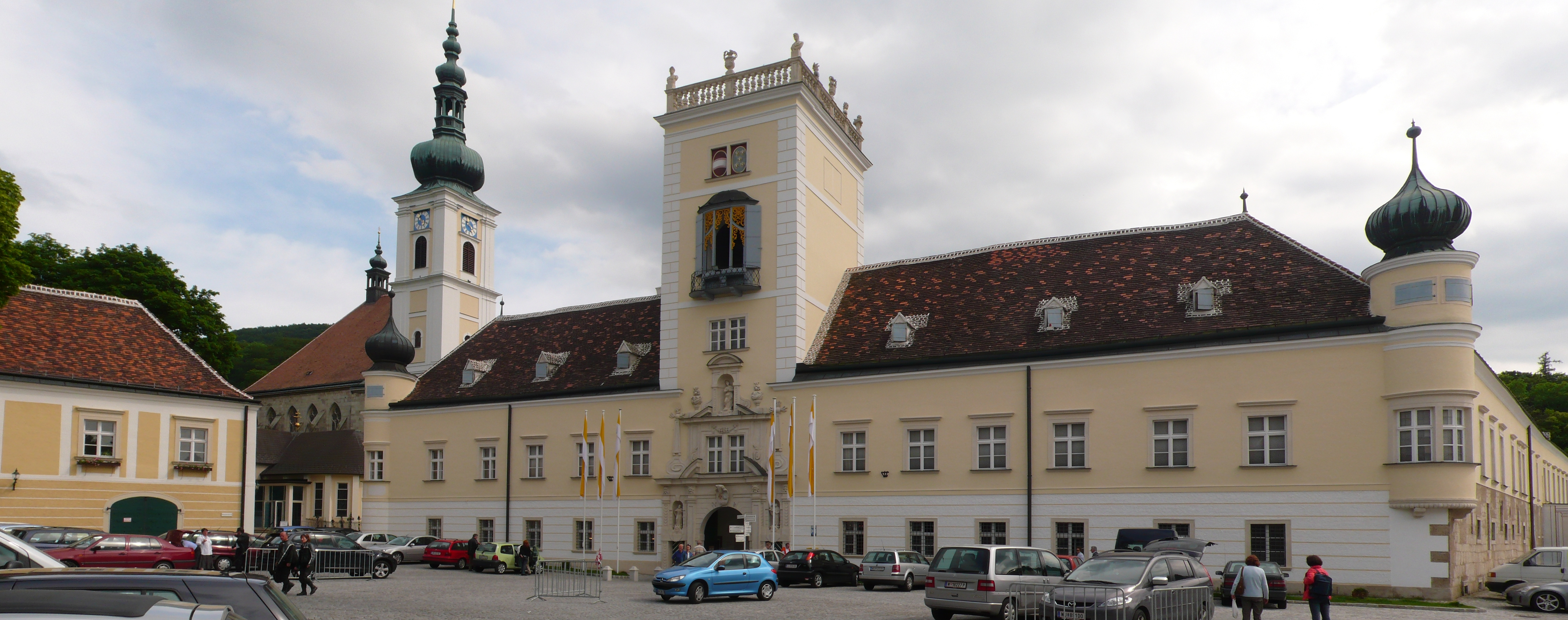
Heiligenkreuz Abbey, Main Gate

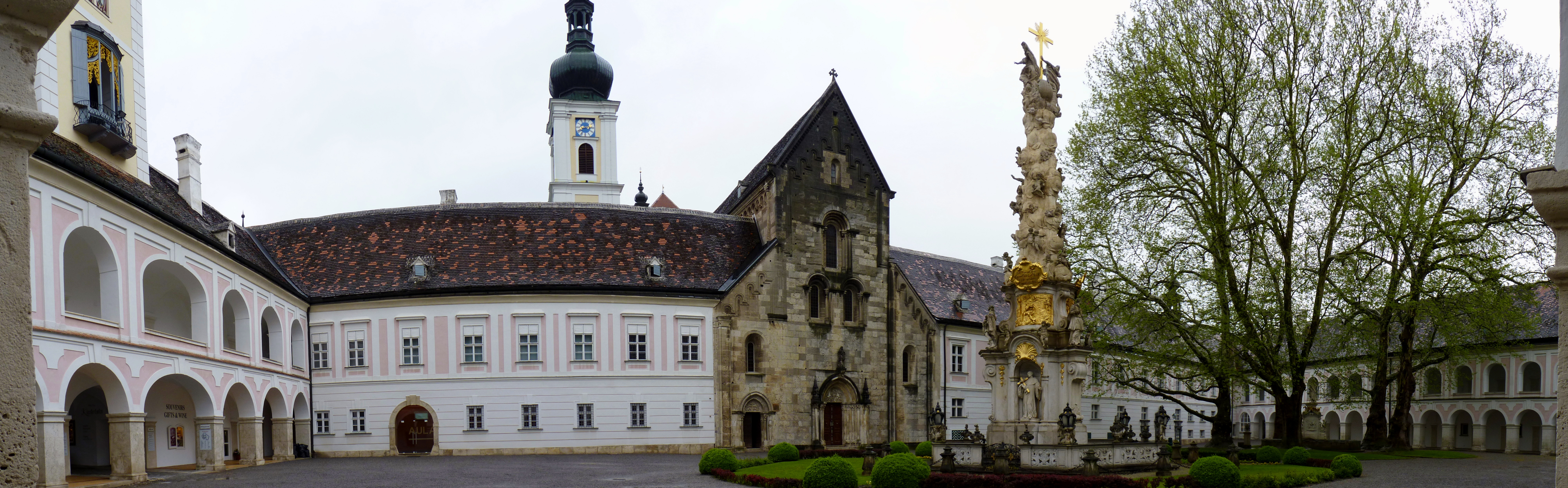
Inner court

Entrance to the abbey is through a large inner court in the centre of which stands a Baroque Holy Trinity Column, designed by Giovanni Giuliani and completed in 1739.

The façade, as in most Cistercian churches, shows three simple windows as a symbol for the Trinity. Typically Cistercian, the church originally lacked a bell-tower, but one was added during the Baroque era on the north side of the church.

The abbey church of Heiligenkreuz combines two styles of architecture. The façade, naves and the transept (dedicated 1187) are Romanesque, while the choir (13th century) is Gothic. The austere nave is a rare, and famous, example of Romanesque architecture in Austria. The 13th century window paintings in the choir are some of the most beautiful remnants of medieval art.

The chapter house in the cloisters contains the graves of thirteen members of the House of Babenberg, some of them being:

- Blessed Otto of Freising
- Duke Leopold V the Virtuous
- Duke Frederick I the Catholic
- Henry I, Duke of Mödling
- Duke Frederick II the Quarrelsome

The remains of Blessed Otto of Freising are kept under the altar of the Blessed Sacrament at the east end of the presbytery.

The Baroness Mary Vetsera, party to a suicide pact in nearby Mayerling with Crown Prince Rudolf von Habsburg, is buried in the village cemetery near Heiligenkreuz.

== Present day ==
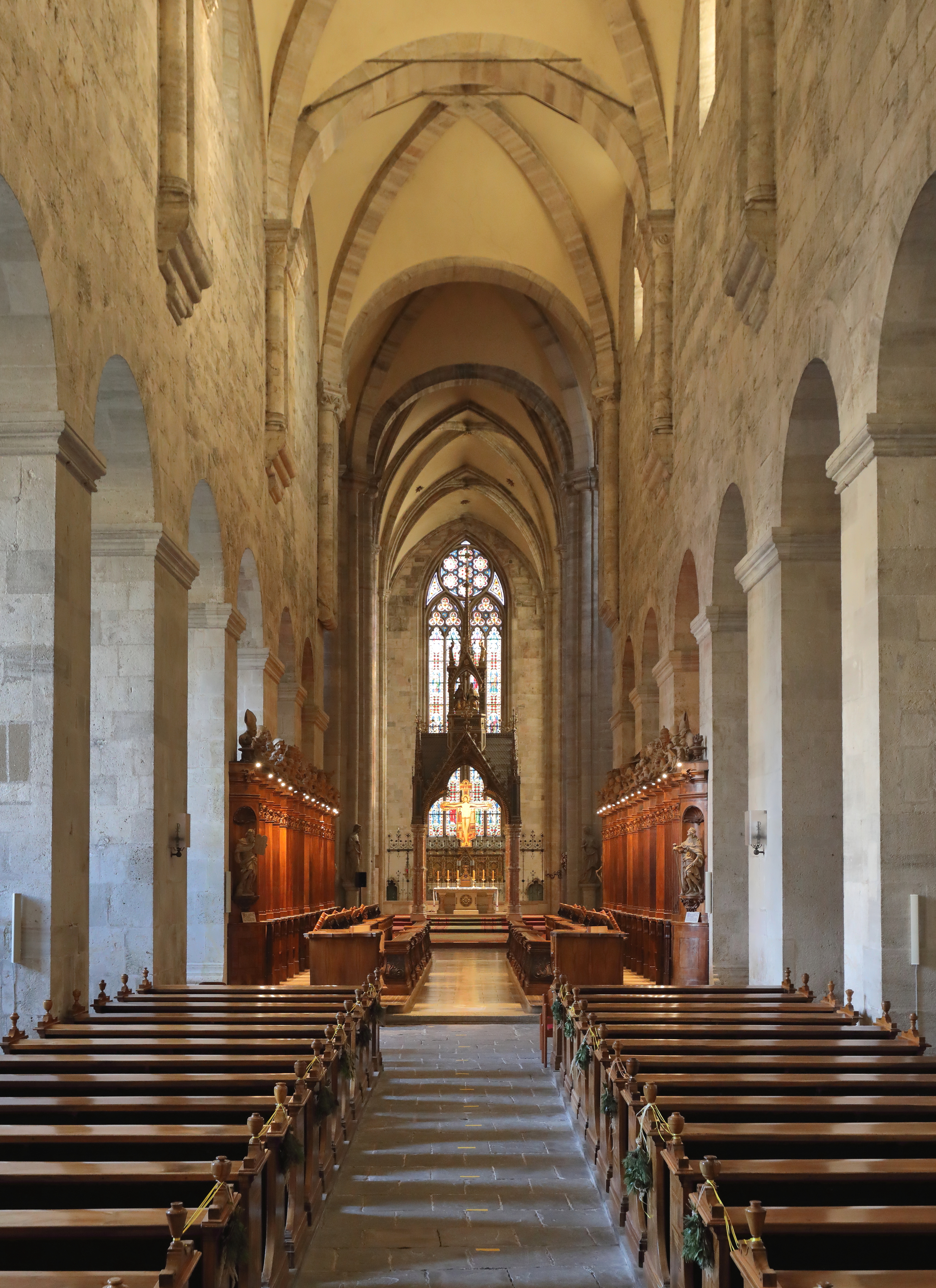
Nave of the church

In 1802 an institute for philosophical and theological studies was established, which became a Hochschule in 1976. The Benedict XVI Philosophical-Theological University is now one of the largest faculties for the education of priests in the German-speaking world. In January 2007, Pope Benedict XVI raised the Hochschule to the status of Pontifical Athenaeum, which means the institution may now grant degrees according to Roman university privileges, instead of in the name of other Austrian universities.

Presently, over 90 monks belong to the monastic community, the focus of which is the liturgy and Gregorian chant in Latin (in the Ordinary Form of the Roman Rite). Some of the monks also have pastoral duties in the 17 parishes for which the abbey is responsible or serve as professors at the Philosophisch-Theologische Hochschule. Others serve in caring for the upkeep of the historic abbey.

Heiligenkreuz is also home to the Priesterseminar Leopoldinum (formerly Collegium Rudolphinum), a theological college for men in preparation for the priesthood.

Stift Heiligenkreuz is known today as one of the most vibrant monasteries in central Europe; the current abbot is a member of the Ratzinger Schülerkreis; one of the monks is the Procurator General of the Order, working in Rome. Many other monasteries send their junior monks to Heiligenkreuz for theological and monastic training. It was one of the first abbeys to realize the value of the internet apostolate, maintaining a frequently updated homepage and several groups on Facebook as well as various blogs.

Pope Benedict XVI visited the abbey and its seminary during his trip to Austria in September 2007.

The abbey has seen continuous growth in vocations in the last 40 years, in contrast to many other monastic institutions. Its present headcount of nearly 100 monks is a historic high point. Particularly since the election of Abbot Maximilian Heim in 2011, the abbey has become known as a haven of conservative and traditional theology. One of the abbey's monks in particular has attracted attention for his far-right integralist beliefs. In 2025, abbey announced that the Dicastery for Institutes of Consecrated Life and Societies of Apostolic Life would perform an apostolic visitation at Heiligenkreuz.

== Media ==
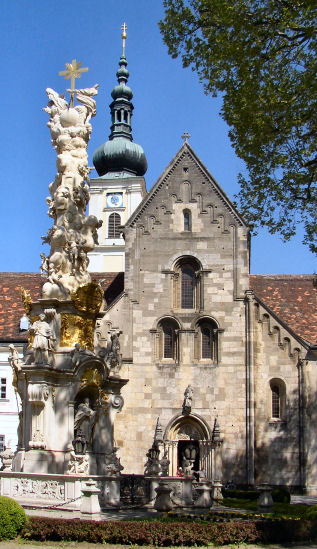
Heiligenkreuz Abbey Church

- In November 2002 Florian Henckel von Donnersmarck, nephew of then-reigning abbot Gregor Henckel Donnersmarck, wrote the screenplay for his film The Lives of Others in a cell at the abbey. After the film won the 2007 Oscar in the category "Best Foreign Film", he returned for a celebration at Heiligenkreuz with the statue on 28 October.
- In April 2008, some of the monks from Heiligenkreuz abbey recorded a CD of Gregorian plainsong, which was released on May 19 on Universal Classics under the title Chant: Music For Paradise (titled Chant: Music for the Soul in the United States). A digital single from the album, "Hymnus 'Veni Creator Spiritus'" was released on May 12. The monks signed the deal with Universal Music after the label had advertised their search for sacred singers and the monks submitted their demo via YouTube. The album quickly went gold in the UK and Germany, platinum in Belgium and Poland, and triple platinum in Austria. In February 2009 the monks were nominated Best Newcomer (International) for the German ECHO Awards (alongside pop-stars like Leona Lewis and Gabriella Cilmi) and the recording was nominated Album of the Year by the Classical Brits 2009.
- In December 2010 HBO premiered a documentary Top Ten Monks, which profiles the monks and tells the story of their album and their lives in the monastery.
- In the autumn of 2011 the community released a new album Chant: Amor Et Passio under their own label Obsculta Music which quickly went gold.
- The inner court of the Abbey along with elements from the church are portrayed on the cover of the children's book 'Paws' by the Bulgarian author T. Yana Yakova; the book is one of the 200 books of 2015 the annual White Raven catalogue of Internationale Jugendbibliothek features.

== See also ==
- Gregorian Chant
- List of carillons
- Master of Heiligenkreuz
- List of Cistercian monasteries
- The Cistercian Monks of Stift Heiligenkreuz
- Our Lady of Lourdes Grotto, Heiligenkreuz (Lower Austria)
