= Stiepel =

Coordinates: 51°25′06″N 7°14′43″E

Stiepel is a southern district of the City of Bochum in the Ruhr area in North Rhine-Westphalia, Germany. It is on the Ruhr River, which is its border to the neighbouring cities of Hattingen and Witten. Stiepel used to be a municipality in the rural district of Bochum, but was integrated into Bochum in 1929.

Stiepel is the most affluent part of Bochum. It has an old village church dating from 1008. Originally a Catholic church, it became a Lutheran church in 1610 when the minister broke away from the church and converted to Lutheranism. The church was honored with a stamp commemorating its 1000th anniversary in 2008.

Stiepel Priory is located in the town.
