= Maximilian Heim =

German-Austrian Catholic priest (born 1961)

The Right Reverend Maximilian Heim OCist
- 64th Abbot of Heiligenkreuz Abbey
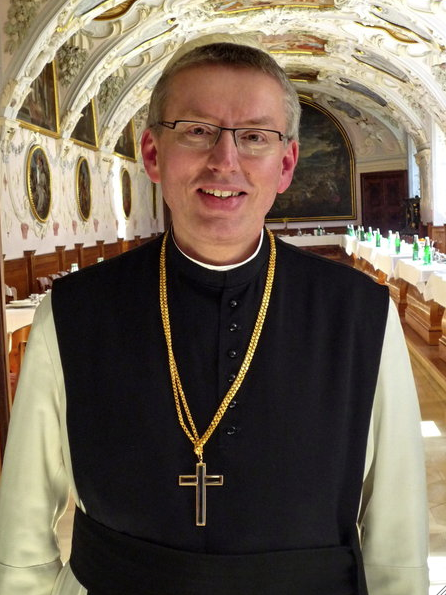
- Maximilian Heim (2011)
- Church: Catholic Church
- Elected: 10 February 2011
- Installed: 25 April 2011
- Term ended: 14 September 2026
- Predecessor: Gregor Henckel-Donnersmarck
- Successor: Simeon Wester (as administrator)
- Other post: Grand Chancellor of the Benedict XVI Philosophical-Theological University

Orders
- Ordination: 30 April 1988

Personal details
- Born: Heinrich Josef Heim; 14 April 1961 (age 65) Kronach, Germany
- Motto: Cor ad cor loquitur (The heart speaks to the heart)
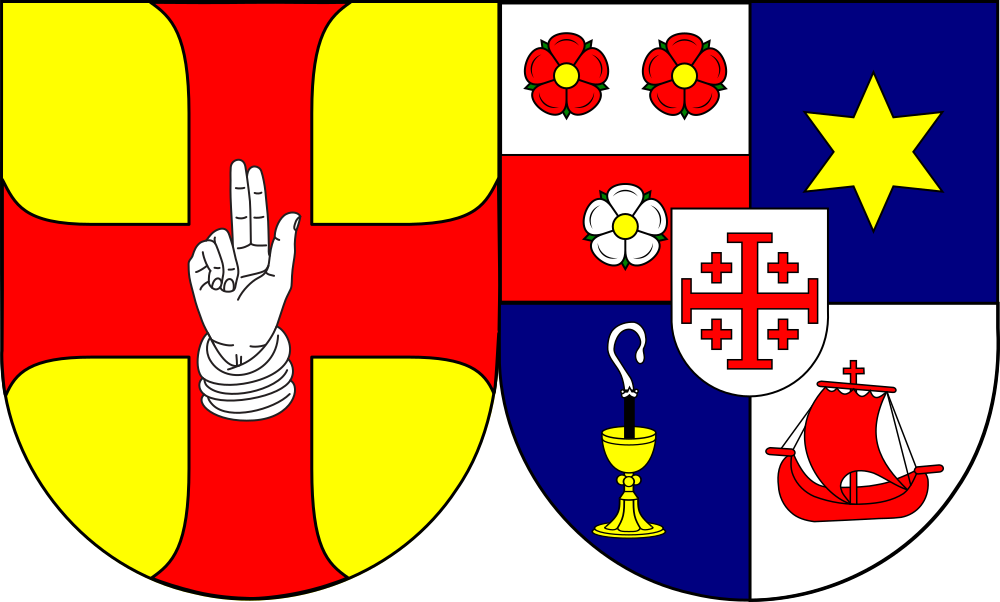
- Coat of arms

Styles of Maximilian Heim
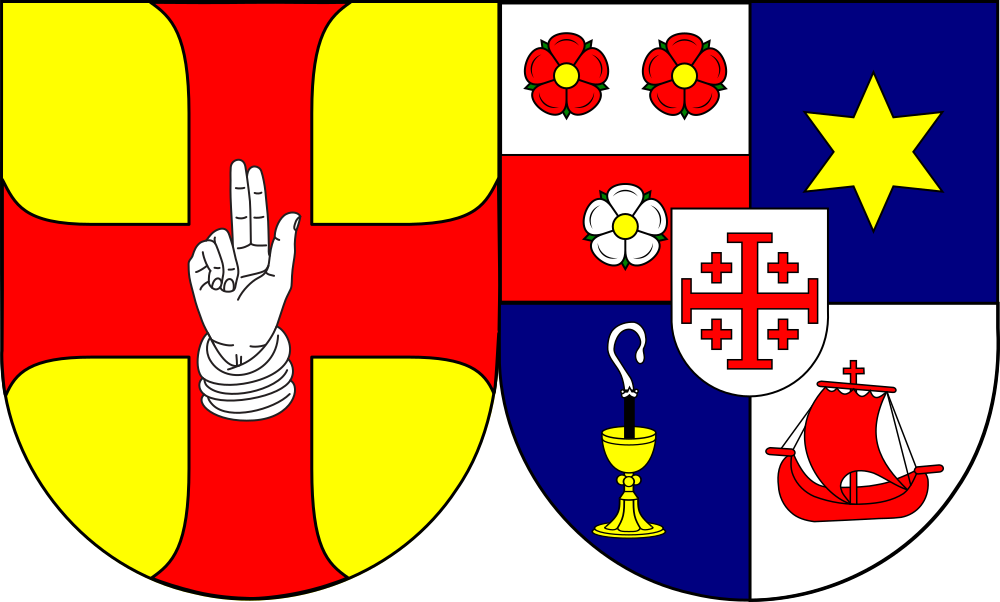
- Reference style: The Right Reverend
- Religious style: Abbot
- Informal style: Father

Maximilian Heinrich Josef Heim OCist (born 14 April 1961) is a German-Austrian Catholic priest and monk of the Cistercian Order. He was the Abbot of the Heiligenkreuz Abbey from February 2011 to September 2026, and the Abbot President of the Austrian Cistercian Congregation from 2016 to 2025.

== Biography ==
On 14 April 1961, Heim was born in Kronach, a town in Bavaria, Germany.

After graduating from high school in Kulmbach, Heim studied theology at the University of Augsburg in 1981.

On 1983, he entered the Heiligenkreuz Abbey as a novitiate, at the same time, he received his religious name "Maximilian", as his patron saint is St. Maximilian Kolbe.

Heim received his Master of Theology from the University of Vienna and was ordained a priest in Heiligenkreuz Abbey on 30 April 1988.

In March 1999, at the age of 37, Abbot Gregor Henckel-Donnersmarck appointed him Prior of Heiligenkreuz Abbey.

On 10 February 2011, Heim was elected the 64th Abbot of Heiligenkreuz Abbey. He received his Austrian citizenship on 19 April 2011.

On 25 April 2011, the Abbot General of the Cistercian Order, Dom Mauro-Giuseppe Lepori, conferred on him the abbot's blessing in a pontifical mass presided over by Cardinal Christoph Schönborn. His motto is taken from St. John Henry Newman: "Cor ad cor loquitur" (The heart speaks to the heart).

Heim was elected Abbot President of the Austrian Cistercian Congregation On 26 May 2016 for a six-year term and re-elected for another six years on 7 June 2022.

On 13 August 2025, Heim resigned from his position as Abbot President. He cited acute heart problems, which resulted in a hospital stay, as the reason. Previously, the Vatican had announced an Apostolic Visitation of the Heiligenkreuz Abbey, in which allegations against the "leadership style of the abbey as a whole, as well as the personal leadership behavior of the abbot" would be investigated. As the abbey's spokesperson confirmed, Heim's resignation was also related to the visitation.

He resigned as Abbot of Heiligenkreuz on 14 September 2026, following the Apostolic Visitation, which called for reform in the Abbey. The convent is set to elect an Administrator for a 3 year periode, before electing an Abbot. On 17 September 2026 Pater Simeon Wester was elected as his successor.
