= Franz Jáchym =

The Most Reverend Franz Jáchym
- Coadjutor Bishop of Vienna; Titular Archbishop of Maronea
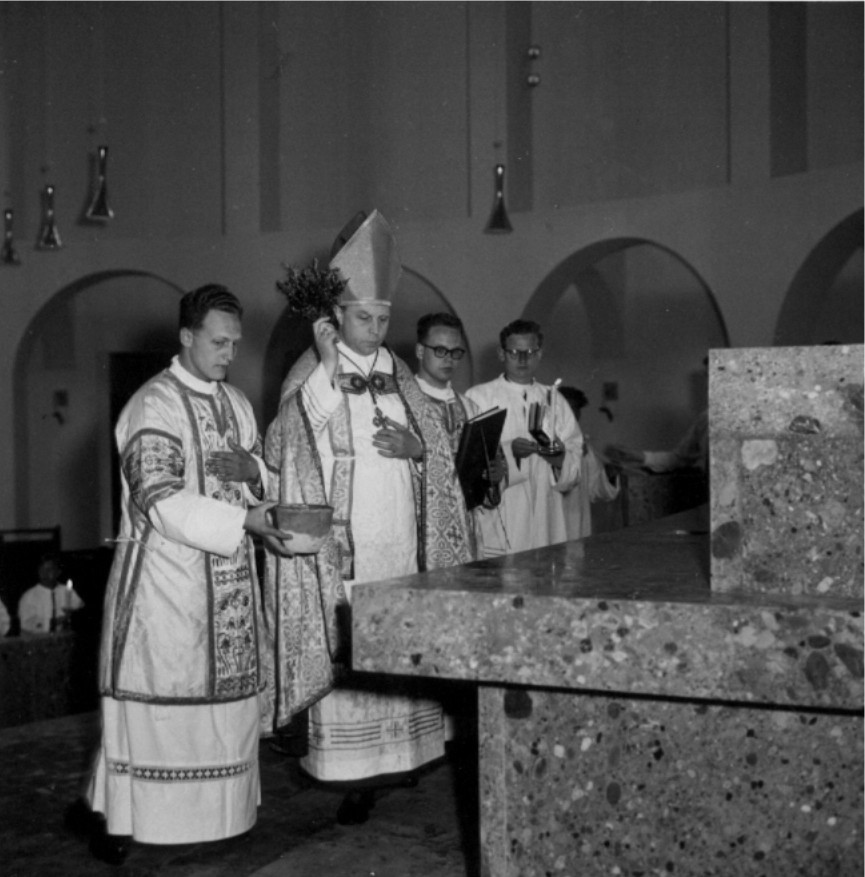
- Jáchym at a church consecration in Liesing
- Church: Roman Catholic Church
- Archdiocese: Vienna
- Appointed: 20 January 1950
- Installed: 19 May 1950
- Term ended: 15 September 1983
- Opposed to: Nazism

Orders
- Ordination: 19 July 1936
- Consecration: 19 May 1950 by Theodor Innitzer

Personal details
- Born: 3 September 1910 Vienna, Austria-Hungary
- Died: 29 November 1984 (aged 74) Vienna, Austria
- Buried: St. Stephen's Cathedral, Vienna
- Education: Seminary of Vienna; University of Vienna (DD)
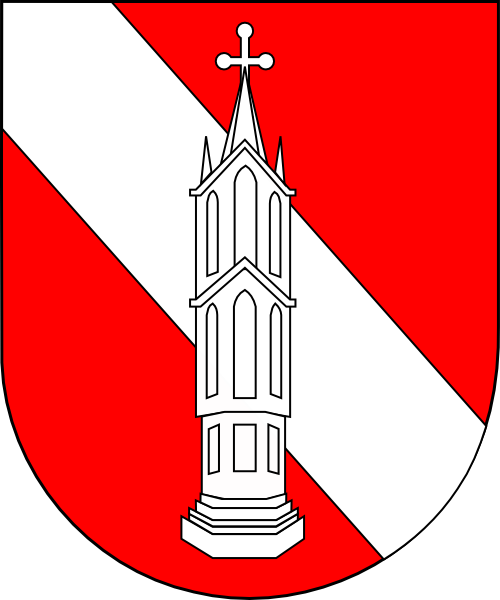
- Coat of arms

Styles of Franz Jáchym
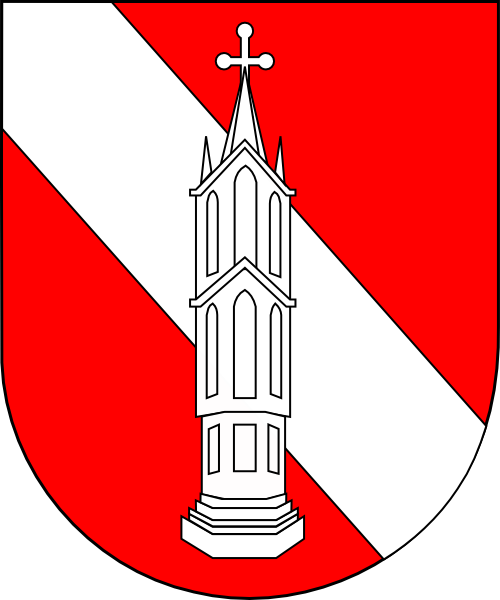
- Reference style: His Excellency *The Most Reverend
- Spoken style: Your Excellency
- Religious style: Archbishop

Franz Jáchym (3 September 1910 – 29 November 1984) was an Austrian prelate of the Roman Catholic Church who served as Coadjutor Bishop of Vienna from 1950 to 1983, and as Titular Archbishop of Maronea. He graduated from the University of Vienna. After ordination, his served in a parish and the diocesan chancery before being appointed coadjutor bishop in 1950. Consecrated in May 1950 by Cardinal Theodor Innitzer, he served in that office until his retirement in 1983.

== Biography ==
=== Early life and education ===
Jáchym was born on 3 September 1910 in Vienna, Austria-Hungary. Orphaned at age eight, in 1925 he entered the Knabenseminar Hollabrunn (de), a minor seminary in Vienna. He passed the matriculation examination on 20 June 1931, and entered the Seminary of Vienna (de), and also studied theology at the University of Vienna. In the late 1930s he returned to the University of Vienna to study moral theology, earning his Doctor of Divinity on 3 December 1941.

=== Priesthood ===
Jáchym was ordained a priest on 19 July 1936. Three months after ordination, he was sent to Purkersdorf, where he served as parochial vicar of the parish there until returning to work in the chancery of the Archdiocese of Vienna soon after.

On 7 October 1938, he participated in the Rosary demonstration (de), a demonstration in which 6,000 Catholics came together for a rosary devotion in protest of the Nazi occupation of Austria. The next day, Nazi soldiers stormed and vandalized the Episcopal Palace in Vienna, and Jachym was injured in the violence that ensued. On 10 May 1947, Jáchym earned habilitation, and in 1949 he was appointed professor of Catholic moral theology at the University of Vienna.

=== Episcopacy ===
On 20 January 1950, Jáchym was appointed Coadjutor Bishop of Vienna and Titular Archbishop of Vienna. He arrived at St. Stephen's Cathedral for what was supposed to be his episcopal consecration on 23 April 1950. However, before the ceremony could take place, he stood up and addressed the congregation, saying that he did not "feel worthy of such an honor", before leaving the cathedral, where a car was waiting for him, and returning to his apartment. Later, canons of the cathedral recalled that the purple robe, the biretta, and shoes he was wearing were not even his, but were borrowed from the cathedral sacristy.

Jáchym firmly declined to become a bishop, but Pope Pius XII refused to accept his decision. His consecration was rescheduled to 19 May 1950, and took place in Rome and the church of Santa Maria dell'Anima. Archbishop of Vienna Cardinal Theodor Innitzer was principal consecrator, with bishops Michael Keller and Alois Hudal serving as co-consecrators.

While there are varying accounts as to why Jáchym chose to reject his episcopal consecration in the first place, he did remain loyal to his office and to the archbishop, both Innitzer and his successor, Cardinal Franz König. As coadjutor bishop, he led the building department of the Archdiocese of Vienna, building new churches and commissioning artwork.

From 1952 to 1956, he served as Chairman of the Austrian Bishops' Conference. In 1956, he took over leadership of the archdiocesan offices. From 1963 to 1965, he took part in the Second Vatican Council. From 1 September 1969 to 31 December 1980, he was vicar general of the archdiocese, succeeding Jakob Weinbach. On 30 September 1972, he became dean of St. Stephen's Cathedral and Chancellor of the Faculty of Catholic Theology at the University of Vienna. On 15 September 1983, he resigned from his positions, aged 73.

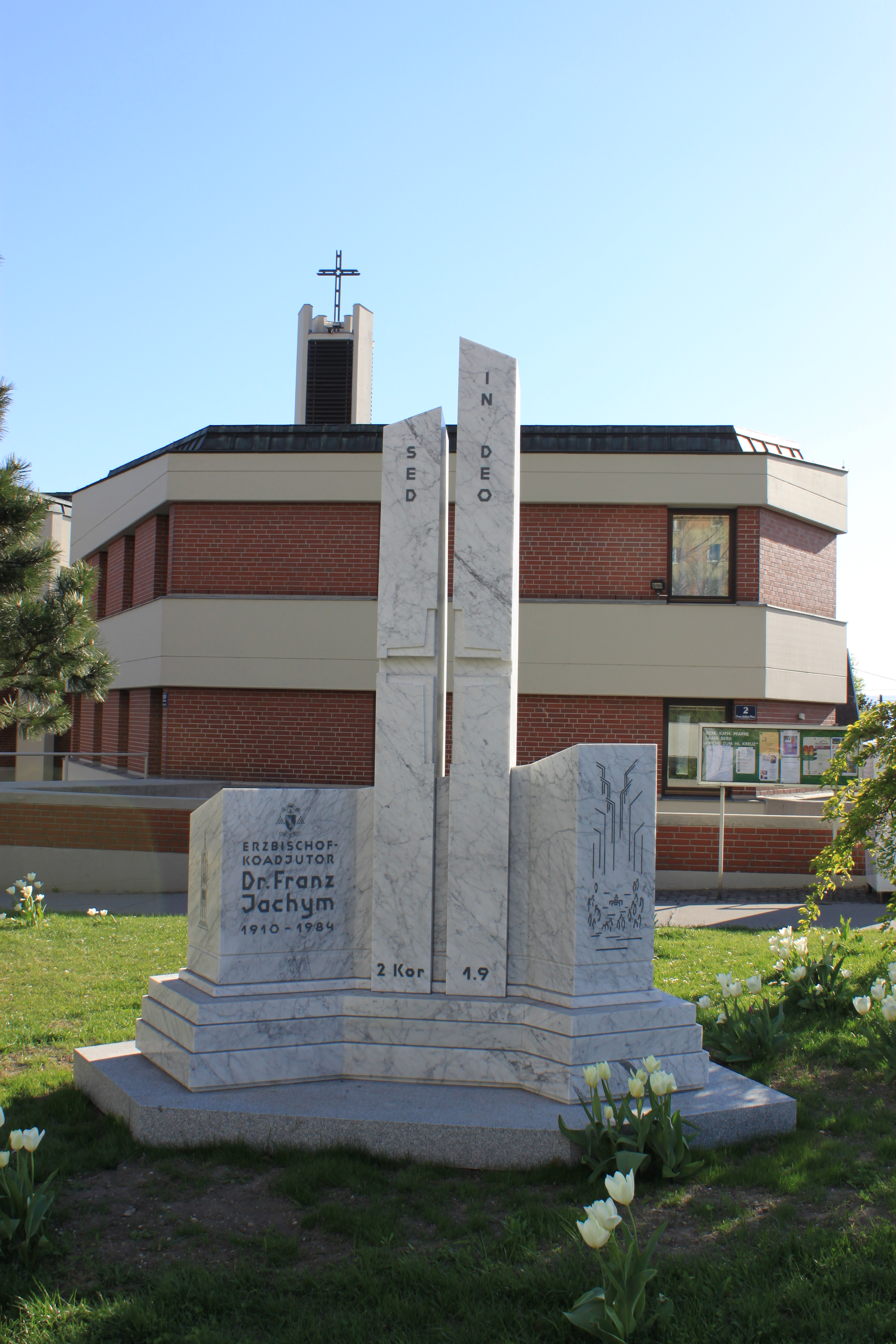
Franz Jáchym monument at Franz-Jáchym-Platz in Vienna.

=== Later life and death ===
After retiring, Jáchym retired to an apartment in Vienna, one that would later be lived in by Cardinal König in his old age. He died on 29 November 1984 of heart failure in an open-air market in Vienna, aged 74. He was buried in a tomb in St. Stephen's Cathedral in Vienna. In 1992, the Franz-Jáchym-Platz (Franz Jáchym Place) in Vienna was named for him and a monument erected in his honor.

== Episcopal lineage ==
- Cardinal Scipione Rebiba
- Cardinal Giulio Antonio Santorio (1566)
- Cardinal Girolamo Bernerio, OP (1586)
- Archbishop Galeazzo Sanvitale (1604)
- Cardinal Ludovico Ludovisi (1621)
- Cardinal Luigi Caetani (1622)
- Cardinal Ulderico Carpegna (1630)
- Cardinal Paluzzo Paluzzi Altieri degli Albertoni (1666)
- Pope Benedict XIII (1675)
- Pope Benedict XIV (1724)
- Pope Clement XIII (1743)
- Cardinal Bernardino Giraud (1767)
- Cardinal Alessandro Mattei (1777)
- Cardinal Pietro Francesco Galleffi (1819)
- Cardinal Giacomo Filippo Fransoni (1822)
- Cardinal Carlo Sacconi (1851)
- Cardinal Edward Henry Howard (1872)
- Cardinal Mariano Rampolla (1882)
- Cardinal Rafael Merry del Val (1900)
- Archbishop Enrico Sibilia (1908)
- Cardinal Theodor Innitzer (1932)
- Archbishop Franz Jáchym (1950)

== See also ==
- Catholic Church in Austria
