= Peralta de Calasanz =

Coordinates: 42.167°N 0.200°E

Peralta de Calasanz/Peralta de Calassanç
- municipality
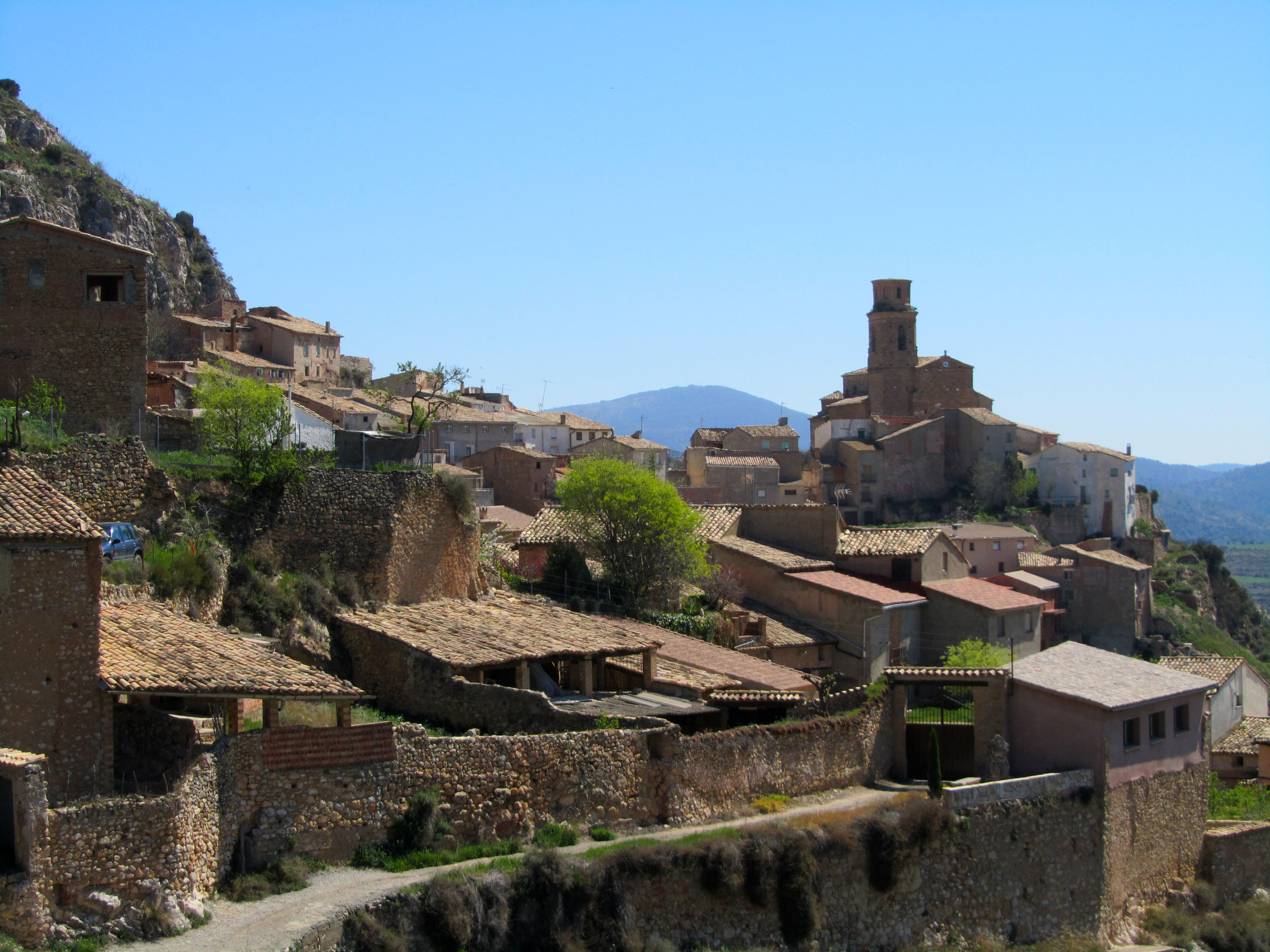
- A place in the municipality of Peralta de Calasanz
- Interactive map of Peralta de Calasanz/Peralta de Calassanç
- Country: Spain
- Autonomous community: Aragon
- Province: Huesca

Area
  - Total: 114 km^{2} (44 sq mi)

Population (2025-01-01)
  - Total: 206
  - Density: 1.81/km^{2} (4.68/sq mi)
- Time zone: UTC+1 (CET)
  - Summer (DST): UTC+2 (CEST)

Peralta de Calasanz (Spanish: [peˈɾalta ðe kalaˈsanθ]) or Peralta de Calassanç (Catalan: [peˈɾalta ðe kalaˈsans]) is a municipality located in the province of Huesca, Aragon, Spain. According to the 2004 census (INE), the municipality has a population of 274 inhabitants.

== See also ==
- List of municipalities in Huesca
