= Pious Workers of St. Joseph Calasanctius of the Mother of God =

Congregation of Christian Workers of Saint Joseph Calasanz
- Congregatio pro operariis christianis a Sancto Iosepho Calasantio (Latin)
- Abbreviation: C.Op. (post-nominal letters)
- Nickname: Calasantini
- Formation: November 24, 1889; 136 years ago
- Founders: Blessed Fr. Anton Maria Schwartz, C.Op.
- Founded at: Vienna, Austria
- Type: Clerical Religious Congregation of Pontifical Right (for Men)
- Headquarters: Pater Schwartz Gasse 8, A-1150 Wien 15, Austria
- Members: 29 members (21 priests) as of 2018
- Motto: Latin: English:
- Superior General: Fr. Clemens Pilar, C.Op.
- Main organ: St Joseph Calasanz
- Affiliations: Roman Catholic Church
- Website: http://www.kalasantiner.at/

The Pious Workers of St. Joseph Calasanctius of the Mother of God (Latin: Congregatio pro operariis christianis a Sancto Iosepho Calasantio) are a Roman Catholic clerical religious congregation of Pontifical Right for men founded at Vienna, Austria in 24 November 1889, by Father Anton Maria Schwartz for works of charity, but especially the apostolate among workingmen. This congregation of priests and lay brothers, follow the Rule of the Piarists, modified in some particulars. Its members add the nominal letters C.Op. at the end of their names to indicate their membership in the congregation.

== History ==
They were founded in Vienna on 24 November 1889, by Father Anton Maria Schwartz for all works of charity, but especially the apostolate among working men. The members of the congregation are both priests and lay brothers who follow the Rule of the Piarists (founded by St. Joseph Calasanctius), modified in some particulars.

The mother-house is the college of Mary Help of Christians, in Vienna, with which is connected a church. The Pious Workers teach Christian doctrine in schools, establish elementary and trade schools, build homes for apprentices and all workmen, open oratories, form associations of working men and promote the diffusion of good literature. At Vienna, which has been so far the chief scene of their activity, in addition to undertaking the works already mentioned, they have taken charge of the reformatory (1904), have opened a public library and have founded among other associations a Guard of Honour of the Most Blessed Sacrament. They have three colleges at Vienna, and other foundations at Deutsch-Goritz in Styria and at Wolfsgraben.

The prayer-book for working men compiled by Father Schwartz has already gone through five editions. Other fathers of the society have published dramas for presentation by clubs under their charge, a book of recitations, and a number of biographies. The organ of the congregation is "St. Calasanctius-Blätter", a monthly issued at Vienna since 1888.
