= Archbishop of Vienna =

Austrian Roman Catholic prelate

The Archbishop of Vienna is the prelate of the Roman Catholic Archdiocese of Vienna who is concurrently the metropolitan bishop of its ecclesiastical province which includes the dioceses of Eisenstadt, Linz and St. Pölten.

From 1469 to 1513, bishops from elsewhere were appointed as administrators. The first bishop residing in Vienna was Georg von Slatkonia. From 1861 to 1918, the archbishops, as members of the Herrenhaus, were represented in the Reichsrat of Cisleithania and bore the title of a Prince-Archbishop.

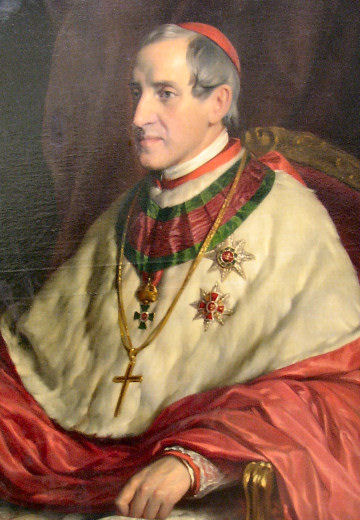
Joseph Othmar Cardinal Ritter von Rauscher, Archbishop of Vienna 1853–1875 (Prince-Archbishop of Vienna from 1861).

The following men were bishops or archbishops of Vienna
Name	from	to
Administrators
Leo von Spaur	1469	1479
Johann Beckensloer	1480	1482
Bernhard von Rohr	1482	1487
Urban Dóczi	1488	1490
Mathias Scheidt	1490	1493
Johann Vitéz	1493	1499
Bernhard von Pollheim	1500	1504
Franz Bakocz	1504	1509
Johannes Gosztónyi de Felsöszeleste	1509	1513
Bishops
Georg von Slatkonia	1513	1522
Petrus Bonomo	1522	1523
Johann von Revellis	1523	1530
Johann Fabri	1530	1541
Frederic Nausea	1541	1552
Christoph Wertwein	1552	1553
Petrus Canisius (Administrator)	1554	1555
Antonín Brus of Mohelnice	1558	1563
Urban Sagstetter von Gurk (Administrator)	1563	1568
Johann Caspar Neubeck	1574	1594
Cardinal Melchior Klesl	1598	1630
Anton Wolfradt	1631	1639
Philipp Friedrich Graf Breuner	1639	1669
Wilderich Freiherr von Waldendorff	1669	1680
Emerich Sinelli	1680	1685
Ernest Graf von Trautson	1685	1702
Franz Anton Graf von Harrach	1702	1705
Franz Ferdinand Freiherr von Rummel	1706	1716
Archbishops
Cardinal Sigismund Graf von Kollonitz	1716	1751
Cardinal Johann Joseph Graf von Trautson	1751	1757
Cardinal Christoph Anton Graf Migazzi	1757	1803
Sigismund Anton Graf von Hohenwart	1803	1820
Leopold Maximilian Graf von Firmian	1822	1831
Vincenz Eduard Milde	1832	1853
Cardinal Joseph Othmar Ritter von Rauscher	1853	1875
Cardinal Johann Rudolf Kutschker	1876	1881
Cardinal Cölestin Joseph Ganglbauer	1881	1889
Cardinal Anton Joseph Gruscha	1890	1911
Cardinal Franz Nagl	1911	1913
Cardinal Friedrich Gustav Piffl	1913	1932
Cardinal Theodor Innitzer	1932	1955
Cardinal Franz König	1956	1986
Cardinal Hans Hermann Groër	1986	1995
Cardinal Christoph Schönborn	1995	2025
Josef Grünwidl	2026	
