= Archdiocese of Vienna =

Catholic ecclesiastical territory

Coordinates: 48.2085°N 16.3731°E

Archdiocese of Vienna Archidioecesis Viennensis Archidioecesis Vindobonensis Erzdiözese Wien

Catholic
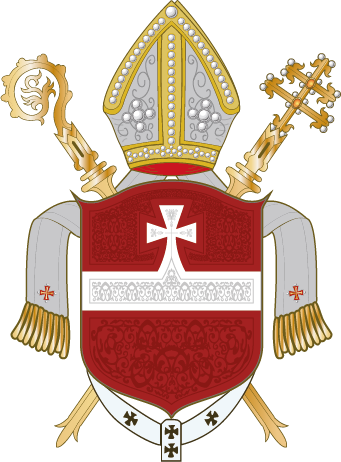

Location
- Country: Austria
- Territory: Vienna, Lower Austria
- Ecclesiastical province: Archdiocese of Vienna
- Metropolitan: Vienna

Statistics
- Area: 9,100 km^{2} (3,500 sq mi)
- Population: Total; Catholics: (as of 2020); ▲2,892,484; ▼1,156,923 (▼40%)
- Parishes: 626

Information
- Denomination: Roman Catholic
- Rite: Roman Rite
- Established: 18 January 1469
- Cathedral: St. Stephen's Cathedral
- Patron saint: Saint Stephen

Current leadership
- Pope: Leo XIV
- Archbishop: Josef Grünwidl
- Auxiliary Bishops: Franz Scharl; Stefan Turnovsky
- Apostolic Administrator: Josef Grünwidl
- Vicar General: Nikolaus Krasa
- Bishops emeritus: Christoph Schönborn

Map
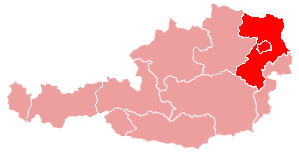

Website
- Website of the Archdiocese

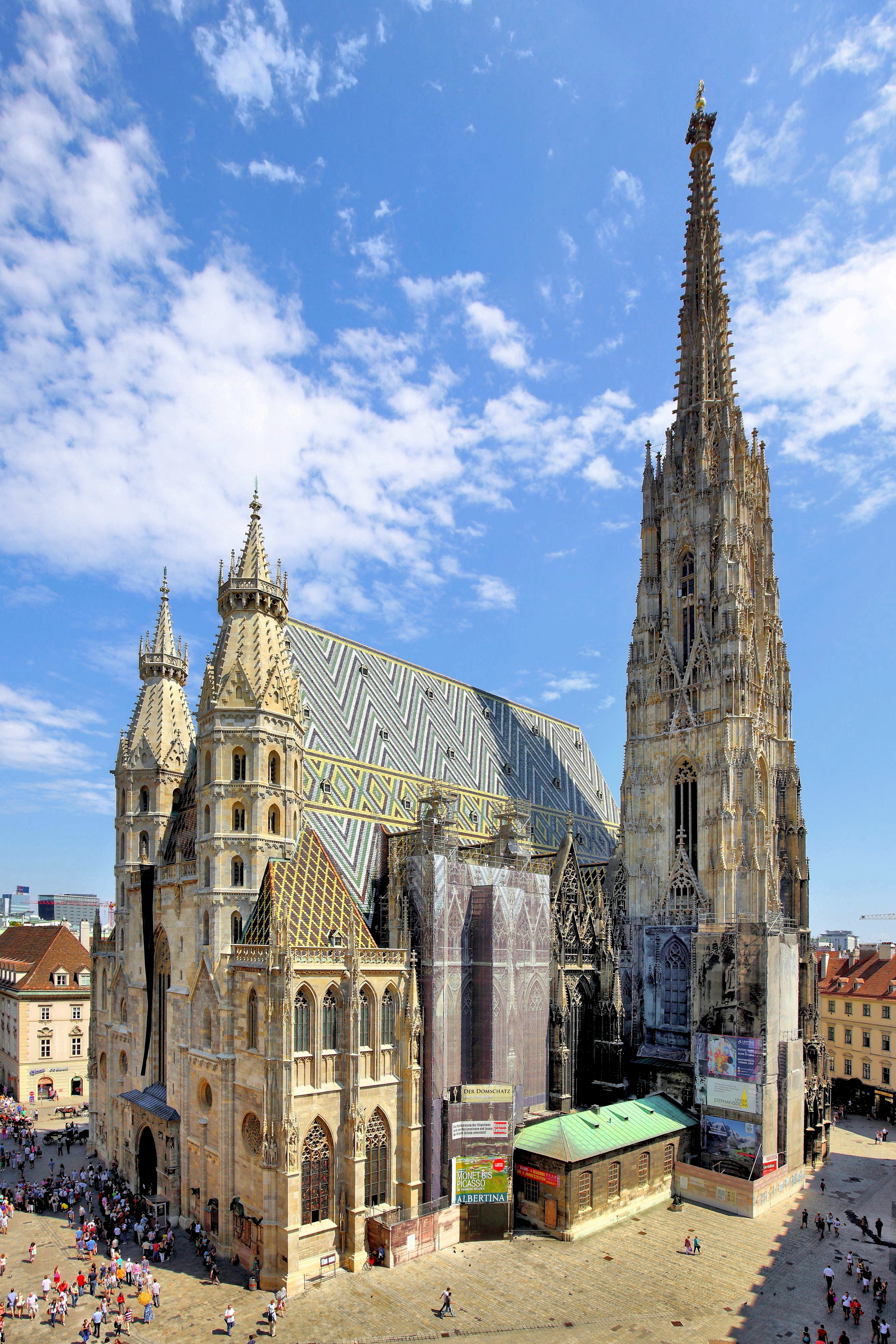
St. Stephen's Cathedral, Vienna

The Archdiocese of Vienna (Latin: Archidioecesis Viennensis) is a Latin Church archdiocese of the Catholic Church in Austria. It was established as the Diocese of Vienna on 18 January 1469 out of the Diocese of Passau, and elevated to an archdiocese on 1 June 1722. The episcopal see is situated in the cathedral of St. Stephen in Vienna.

The Archdiocese is the metropolitan diocese of three suffragan dioceses: Roman Catholic Diocese of Eisenstadt, of Linz, and of Sankt Pölten. These four dioceses together constitute the ecclesiastical province of Vienna, one of only two ecclesiastical provinces of Austria, the other under the Roman Catholic Archdiocese of Salzburg.

The Archbishop is Josef Grünwidl since 24 January 2026 as the successor of Cardinal Christoph Schönborn.

== History ==
At the request of the Emperor Frederick III, the Diocese of Vienna was established by Pope Paul II on 18 January 1469, out of territory taken from the Diocese of Passau. It was elevated to an archdiocese on 1 June 1722.

In 1642, St. Roch's Church was built in Vienna by Ferdinand III in thanks for the preservation of Vienna from the plague.

Cardinal Joseph Othmar von Rauscher (1853–1875) presided over a provincial synod in the cathedral of S. Stephen in Vienna in October 1858.

== Episcopal ordinaries ==
Suffragan Bishops of Vienna

- Leo von Spaur (23 December 1471 Confirmed – 6 March 1479 Died)
- Georg von Slatkonia (12 Aug 1513 Appointed – 26 April 1522 Died)
- Johann von Revellis (6 April 1524 Confirmed – 27 December 1529 Died)
- Johann Fabri (5 December 1530 Appointed – 21 May 1541 Died)
- Friedrich Nausea (21 May 1541 Succeeded – 6 February 1552 Died)
- Antonín Brus of Mohelnice, O. Cruc. (17 July 1560 Appointed – 5 September 1561 Appointed, Archbishop of Prague)
- Johann Kaspar Neuböck (4 February 1575 Appointed – 28 August 1594 Died)
- Melchior Klesl (15 July 1613 Appointed – 18 September 1630 Died)
- Anton Wolfradt (26 May 1631 Confirmed – 1 April 1639 Died)
- Philipp Friedrich von Breuner (5 September 1639 Confirmed – 22 May 1669 Died)
- Wilderich von Walderdorff (19 August 1669 Confirmed – 4 September 1680 Died)
- Emerich (Johann Anton) Sinelli, O.F.M. Cap. (3 March 1681 Confirmed – 25 February 1685 Died)
- Ernst von Trautson zu Falkenstein (10 September 1685 Confirmed – 7 January 1702 Died)
- Franz Anton von Harrach zu Rorau (7 January 1702 Succeeded – 31 July 1706 Resigned)
- Franz Ferdinand von Rummel (4 October 1706 Confirmed – 15 March 1716 Died)

Metropolitan Archbishops of Vienna

- Cardinal Sigismund Kollonitsch (1 July 1716 Confirmed - 12 April 1751 Died)
- Cardinal Johann Joseph von Trautson zu Falkenstein (Trauston) (12 April 1751 Succeeded - 10 March 1757 Died)
- Cardinal Christoph Bartholomäus Anton Migazzi (23 May 1757 * Confirmed - 14 April 1803 Died)
- Sigismund Anton von Hohenwart, S.J. (20 June 1803 Confirmed - 29 June 1820 Died)
- Leopold Maximilian Graf von Firmian (Frimian) (25 January 1822 Appointed – 29 November 1831 Died)
- Vinzenz Eduard Milde (27 October 1831 Appointed – 14 March 1853 Died)
- Cardinal Joseph Othmar von Rauscher (20 March 1853 Appointed – 24 November 1875 Died)
- Cardinal Johann Baptist Rudolph Kutschker (12 January 1876 Appointed – 27 January 1881 Died)
- Cardinal Cölestin Joseph Ganglbauer, O.S.B. (23 March 1881 Appointed – 14 December 1889 Died)
- Cardinal Anton Josef Gruscha (24 January 1890 Appointed – 15 August 1911 Died)
- Cardinal Franz Xavier Nagl (5 August 1911 Succeeded – 4 February 1913 Died)
- Cardinal Friedrich Gustav Piffl (1 April 1913 Appointed – 21 April 1932 Died)
- Cardinal Theodor Innitzer (19 September 1932 Appointed – 9 October 1955 Died)
- Cardinal Franz König (10 May 1956 Appointed – 16 September 1985 Retired)
- Cardinal Hans Hermann Groër, O.S.B. (15 July 1986 Appointed – 14 September 1995 Retired)
- Cardinal Christoph Schönborn, O.P. (14 September 1995 Succeeded – 22 January 2025 Retired)
- Archbishop Josef Grünwidl (24 January 2026 - Present)

== Notable people ==
- Heinrich Maier, important resistance fighter against Nazi terror
- St. Peter Canisius, Dutch Jesuit Priest & Doctor of the Church

== See also ==
- Archbishop of Vienna
- Seminary of Vienna

== Sources ==
- Zschokke, Hermann (1895). Geschichte des Metropolitan-Capitels zum heiligen Stephan in Wien. (in German and Latin). Vienna: C. Konegen, 1895.
