= Johann Joseph von Trautson =

Austrian Roman Catholic clergyman

His Eminence Johann Joseph von Trautson
- Cardinal, Prince-Archbishop of Vienna
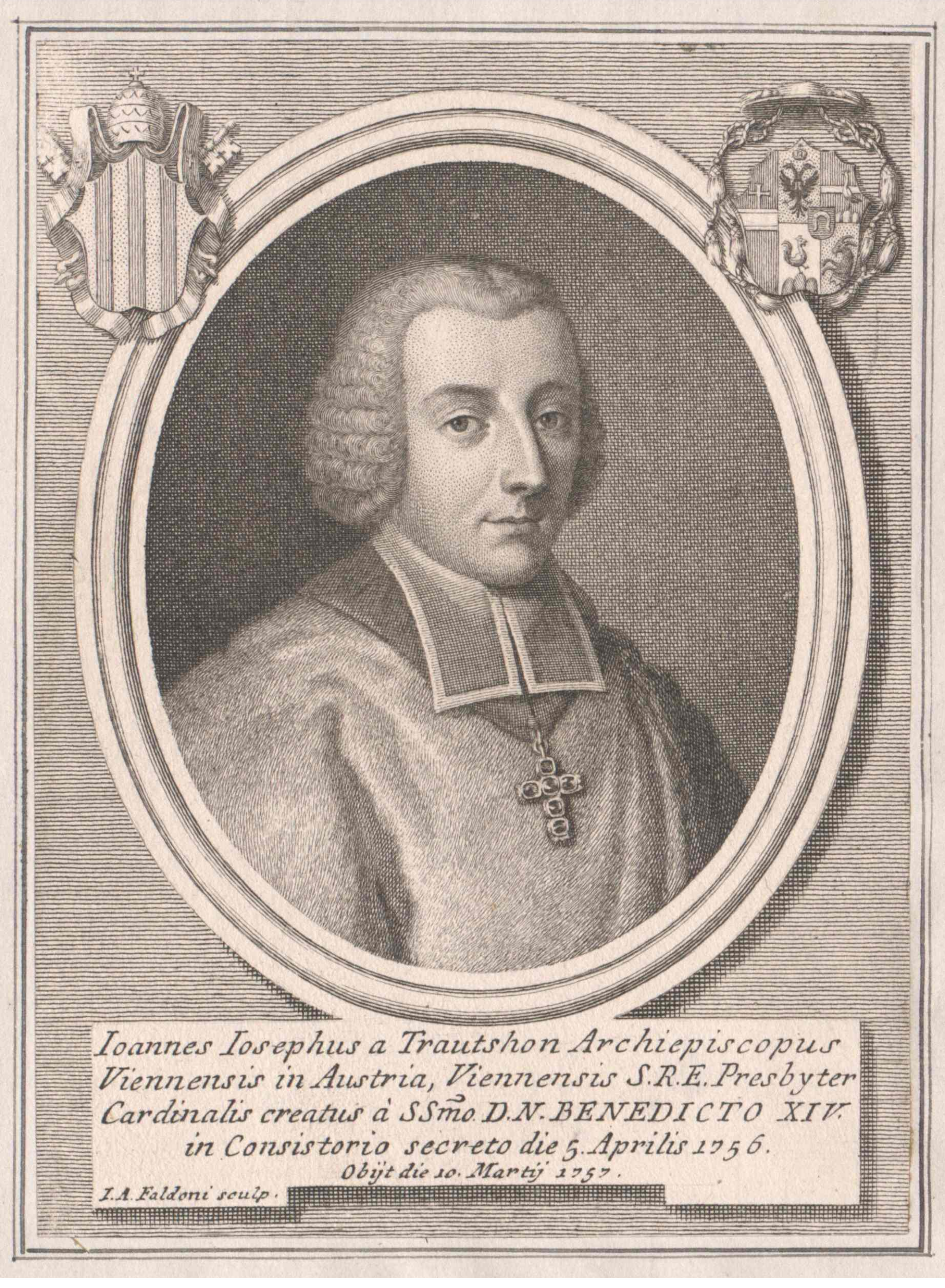
- Church: Roman Catholic Church
- Archdiocese: Vienna
- See: St. Stephen's Cathedral
- Installed: 12 April 1751
- Term ended: 10 March 1757
- Predecessor: Sigismund von Kollonitsch
- Successor: Christoph Bartholomäus Anton Migazzi
- Other post: Titular Archbishop of Cartagine (1750–51)

Orders
- Ordination: 21 September 1728 (Deacon); 26 September 1728 (Priest)
- Consecration: 25 December 1750 (Bishop) by Sigismund von Kollonitsch
- Created cardinal: 5 April 1756 by Pope Benedict XIV

Personal details
- Born: 17 July 1707 Falkenstein, Austria, Holy Roman Empire
- Died: 10 March 1757 (aged 49) Vienna, Austria, Holy Roman Empire

Johann Joseph Graf von Trautson zu Falkenstein (17 July 1707 – 10 March 1757) was a Roman Catholic clergyman. In 1750 he was coadjutor of the Archdiocese of Vienna and Titular Archbishop of Cartagine, was appointed from 1751 to 1757 the Prince-Archbishop of Vienna, and was from 1756 to 1757 a cardinal.

== Biography ==
He came from the Tyrolean Uradel, was a younger son of the Imperial Count John Leopold, Prince of Trautson and Count of Falkenstein (d. 1724), Lord in Upper Austria, Obersthofmeister, Knight of the Order of the Golden Fleece and his wife, Theresia Ungnad von Weissenwolff Freiin zu Sonnegg u. Ennsegg (d. 1741). Decisive for his career was his uncle, Ernst von Trautson zu Falkenstein, who from 1685 to 1702 was Prince-Bishop of Vienna.

After a theological education, Trautson earned his doctorate in the Holy Scriptures. The ordination he received on 26 September 1728 in Salzburg. He was first canon in Salzburg, then canon in Passau and Wrocław, and provost of Ardagger.

On 7 December 1750 he was appointed coadjutor of the Archdiocese of Vienna and titular archbishop of Cartagine. The episcopal consecration was bestowed by Archbishop Sigismund von Kollonitsch on 25 December of the same year. After the death of Cardinal Kollonitsch, he headed from 17 May 1751 the diocese as prince-archbishop.

In a pastoral letter of 1 January 1752, he denounced the abuses of sermons, the superstitious beliefs of the people and excesses of indulgences. He was accused of being a Protestant.

Maria Theresa appointed him protector of the theological and philosophical sciences at the University of Vienna and head of the new building of the university (now Old University and seat of the Austrian Academy of Sciences).

Shortly before his death he was appointed on 5 April 1756 cardinal-priest. He was buried in the episcopal tomb of St. Stephen's Cathedral in Vienna.

== Bibliography ==
- Franz Hadriga: Die Trautson. Paladine Habsburgs. Styria, Graz u. a. 1996, ISBN 3-222-12337-3, S. 139–142.
- Franz Loidl: Geschichte des Erzbistums Wien. Herold, Wien 1983, ISBN 3-7008-0223-4.
- Ernst Tomek: Kirchengeschichte Österreichs. Tyrolia, Innsbruck – Wien – München 1935–59.
- Josef Wodka: Kirche in Österreich. Wegweiser durch ihre Geschichte. Herder, Wien 1959.
