= Frederic Nausea =

German bishop

- Bishop of Vienna

Personal details
- Born: c. 1496; Waischenfeld, Germany
- Died: 6 February 1552; Trient

Frederic Nausea, born Friedrich Grau about 1496 in Waischenfeld, Germany; † 6 February 1552 in Trient, was the Catholic Bishop of the diocese of Vienna. Nausea is the Latin equivalent of his German name (grauen = to disgust, become ashen).

== Life ==
He was the son of a wagonmaker and received his early education at Bamberg and probably at Nuremberg under John Cochlæus; with Paul of Schwartzenberg, canon of Bamberg, he pursued humanistic, juristic, and theological studies at Pavia, Padua, and later at Siena, there obtaining degrees in Law and Divinity.

Cardinal Lorenzo Campeggio, Archbishop of Bologna and papal legate in Germany, employed him as secretary and as such Nausea was at the Diet of Nuremberg (1524), at the convention of Ratisbon, at the Diet of Ofen, and for a time at Rome. In 1524, he visited Philipp Melanchthon at the latter's home town of Bretten in an unsuccessfully attempt to return Melanchthon to Roman Catholicism. In 1525 he accepted the parish of St. Bartholomew at Frankfurt-on-the-Main and the title of Canon, but was soon obliged to leave on account of the intrigues and riots of the Lutherans, some of which were aimed at him. He came to Aschaffenburg and in 1526 to Mainz as preacher at the cathedral. He attended the Diet of Speier in 1529 and in 1534 was appointed counsellor and preacher at the court of King Ferdinand. On February 5, 1538, he was appointed coadjutor to Johann Faber, Bishop of Vienna, succeeding him in 1541.

=== As bishop ===
Nausea worked for reconciliation between the Lutheran and Catholic churches. Together with other prelates, he asked Rome to permit the clergy to marry and the laity to use the communion cup. He also advised Cologne or Ratisbon as the place for holding the General Council. He was prevented from being present at the opening of the Council of Trent by contrary orders from the king, but met Pope Paul III at Parma (1546) and there gave him his Sylvæ Synodales. When the Council reopened at Trent in 1551 Nausea was present, and took an active part in its deliberations, especially on the Sacraments. His participation was of short duration since for he died at Trent of a fever on February 6, 1552. His body was brought to Vienna and buried in the cathedral.

== Works ==
In the Acts of the Council Nausea is praised for his knowledge, his virtues, and his ecclesiastical convictions (Augustin Theiner, Acta genuina Conc. Trid., I, Zagreb, 1874, 652). Among his writings are:

- Distichs on the works of Lactantius;
- Ars Poetica; sermons and homilies on evangelical virtues, the Sacrifice of the Mass, the Blessed Virgin Mary, the life of a true Christian;
- Catechismus catholicus (Cologne, 1543);
- Pastoralium inquisitionum elenchi tres (Vienna, 1547);
- On the Resurrection of Christ and of the dead (Vienna, 1551); etc.

For a full list see Metzner (Fr. Nausea aus Weissenfels, Ratisbon, 1884).
