= Wilderich von Walderdorff =

Austrian bishop

His Grace Wilderich von Walderdorff
- Prince-Bishop of Vienna
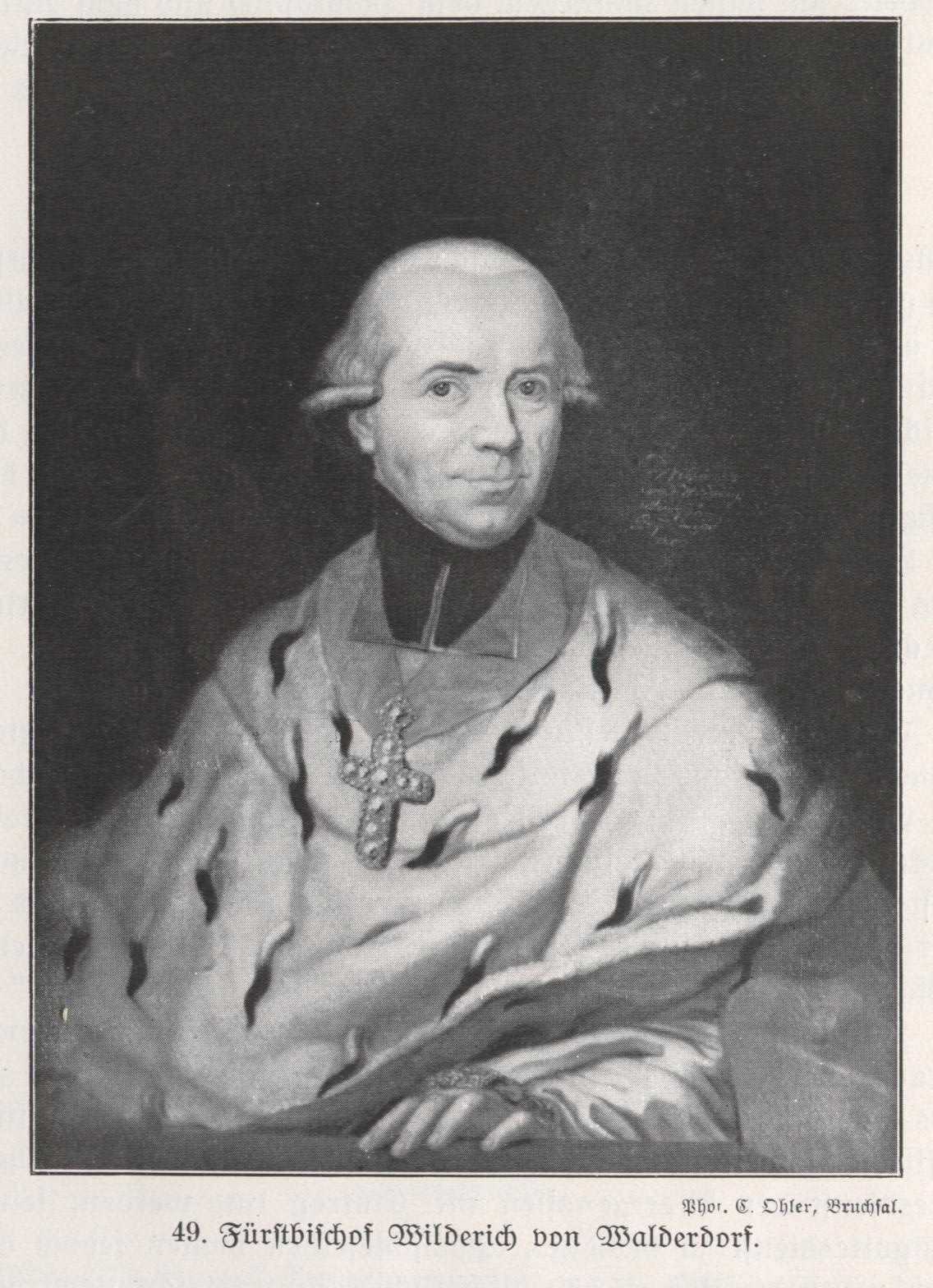
- Church: Roman Catholic Church
- Diocese: Vienna
- See: St. Stephen's Cathedral
- Installed: 19 August 1669
- Term ended: 4 September 1680
- Predecessor: Philipp Friedrich von Breuner
- Successor: Emerich Sinelli

Personal details
- Born: 14 January 1617 Würzburg, Prince-Bishopric of Würzburg, Holy Roman Empire
- Died: 4 September 1680 (aged 63) Vienna, Austria, Habsburg Empire
- Education: Collegium Germanicum

Wilderich Freiherr von Walderdorff (14 January 1617, Würzburg – 4 September 1680, Vienna) from the Walderdorff family was Prince-Bishop of Vienna and Reichsvizekanzler (Vice-Chancellor) of the Holy Roman Empire (1660–1669).

== Biography ==
He was a member of the Walderdorff family; the son of Johann Peter von Walderdorff (1575–1635) and his wife Maria Magdalena Greiffenklau zu Vollrads (1595–1678), sister of the Archbishop of Mainz, Georg Friedrich von Greiffenclau zu Vollrads. The epitaph of his parents is located in the town church of Limburg an der Lahn. His younger brother Johann Philipp von Walderdorff (1620–1689) was also a clergyman, as well as canon in Speyer and Trier. Together with him, he built the Walderdorffer Hof between 1665 and 1668.

The young nobleman first studied in Würzburg, Speyer and the Collegium Germanicum in Rome, was not ordained a priest until 1659 and soon became a canon in Würzburg, Speyer and Mainz. From 1647 to 1669, Walderdorff was Vicar-General of Mainz, from 1650 dean, later also cathedral provost in the Diocese of Speyer. He became Imperial Privy Councilor and served as Reich Vice Chancellor for 11 years.

Walderdorff acquired in the mid-seventeenth century the Stockheimer Hof on the then Frauenbrüderplatz called Carmelite Square. In 1720 he removed and converted a two-storey angular building with a high hipped roof. In the middle of the facade, which is oriented towards the Karmeliterplatz, a Baroque architectural frame was inserted in the middle with a Madonna figure on a crescent moon. The pedestal shows the family crest of Greiffenclau-Vollrads, from which his mother originates, and Walderdorff's Latin inscription "SUB TUUM PRAESIDIUM" (Under your protection may this house stand). The Baroque court complex was largely destroyed in 1942 by aerial bombs.

Emperor Leopold I appointed him Bishop of Vienna in 1669. Because of his gentleness and charity towards the poor he was very popular. He sought to exalt piety in his diocese and to train native priests. Hydrops caused him in 1674 to appoint the Schottenstift's Johann Schmitzberger as auxiliary bishop, who represented him as bishop.

He is buried in St. Stephen's Cathedral in Vienna.

== Bibliography ==
- Rudolf Leeb u. a.: Geschichte des Christentums in Österreich. Von der Antike bis zur Gegenwart. Uebereuter, Wien 2003, ISBN 3-8000-3914-1
- Franz Loidl: Geschichte des Erzbistums Wien. Herold, Wien 1983, ISBN 3-7008-0223-4
- Ernst Tomek: Kirchengeschichte Österreichs. Tyrolia, Innsbruck – Wien – München 1935–59
