= Hofkammer =

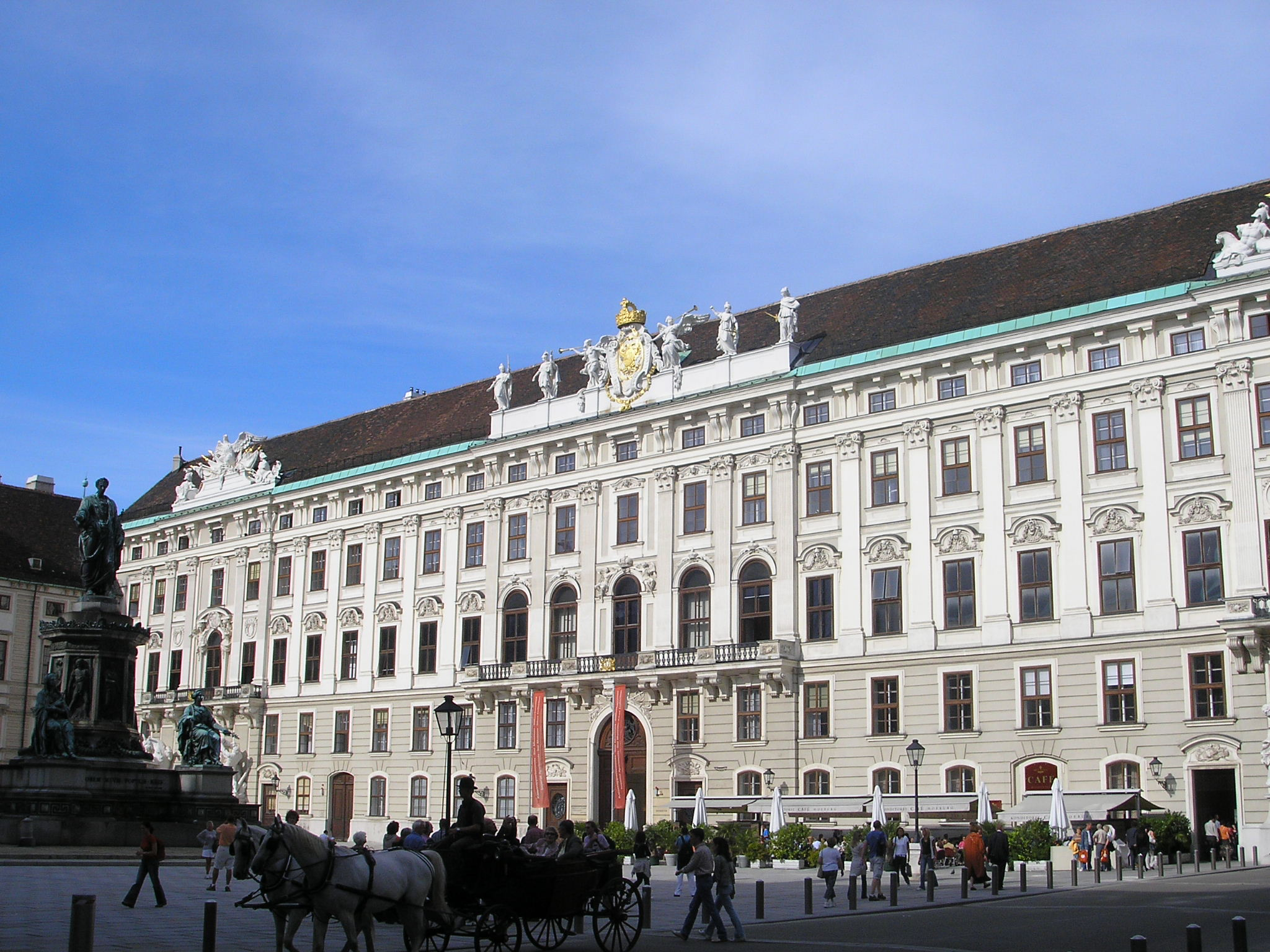
Imperial Chancellery wing of the Vienna Hofburg Palace, where the Hofkammer was housed

The Hofkammer (English: 'Court Chamber') was the central financial institution of the Habsburg monarchy, responsible for the income and expenditure of the court and the state. It was in operation from 1527 to 1848.

== History ==
Already under Emperor Maximilian I, the financial administration of the Habsburg hereditary lands and the Holy Roman Empire was centralized in a single court or treasury.

This institution was further reformed under Emperor Ferdinand I and became independent of the Aulic Council in 1527. The regional Lower Austrian Chamber in Vienna, the Upper Austrian Chamber in Innsbruck, the Bohemian Chamber in Prague, and the Hungarian Chamber in Pozsony (today Bratislava) all fell under the Central Court Chamber (Hofkammer). After 1558, this was also the case for the Silesian Chamber in Breslau (today Wrocław).

The Hofkammer was housed in the Imperial Chancellery wing of the Hofburg Palace in Vienna.

Under Empress Maria Theresa, the Hofkammer was elevated to the central financial and economic authority of the Habsburg Monarchy, making it the highest authority not only for finance, but also for trade, economics, mining, and transport until the 19th century. It was not until 1848 that these powers were divided among newly created ministries and the Hofkammer was abolished.

The Hofkammer is the predecessor of the current Austrian Federal Ministry of Finance.

=== Presidents of the Hofkammer ===
The authority was initially headed by a Supreme Councillor, later known as President.

- 1527–1549 Hans Hofmann von Grünbühel
- 1550–1556 Philipp Baron von Breuner
- 1556–1567 Erasmus Baron of Gera
- 1567–1576 Reichard Streun Baron of Schwarzenau
- 1577–1579 Christoph Baron von Althan
- 1580–1601 Ferdinand Hofmann Baron of Grünbühel
- 1602–1605 Wolf Baron von Unverzagt
- 1605–1606 Jakob Baron von Mollard
- 1506–1508 Helmhart Baron von Jörger
- 1508–1512 Paul Baron von Krauseneck
- 1612–1613 Hans Baron von Urschenbeck
- 1613–1615 Seyfried Christoph von Breuner
- 1615–1616 Gundaker, Prince of Liechtenstein
- 1617–1618 Vacancy
- 1618–1619 Seifrid Christoph Baron von Breuner
- 1619–1623 Gundaker, Prince of Liechtenstein (2nd term)
- 1623–1629 Anton Wolfradt, Abbot of Kremsmünster
- 1630–1634 Maximilian Baron von Breuner
- 1634–1637 Ignaz Krafft, Abbot of Lilienfeld
- 1637–1648 Ulrich Franz Count Kolowrat
- 1648–1656 David Ungnad von Weissenwolff
- 1656–1679 George Louis, Count of Sinzendorf
- 1680–1683 Christoph Ignaz Abele
- 1683–1692 Wolfgang Andreas Count Orsini-Rosenberg
- 1692–1694 Leopold Karl von Kollonitsch, Cardinal, Archbishop of Kalocsa
- 1694–1698 Seyfried Christoph, Count Breuner
- 1698–1700 Thomas, Count Starhemberg
- 1700–1703 Gotthard, Count Salburg
- 1703–1715 Gundaker Thomas Starhemberg
- 1716–1719 Franz Anton, Count Walsegg
- 1719–1755 Johann Franz Gottfried, Count Dietrichstein
- 1755–1759 Karl Ferdinand von Königsegg-Erps
- 1759–1762 Rudolph Chotek von Chotkow
- 1762–1765 Johann Seyfried von Herberstein
- 1765–1771 Carl Friedrich Hatzfeldt zu Gleichen
- 1771–1796 Leopold Wilhelm von Kolowrat-Krakowsky
- 1796–1797 Prokop, Count Lazansky
- 1797–1802 Franz, Count Saurau
- 1802–1808 Count Károly Zichy
- 1808–1810 Count Joseph O’Donnell
- 1810–1813 Count Joseph of Wallis
- 1813–1814 Count Alois Ugarte
- 1814–1816 Johann Philipp Stadion, Count von Warthausen
- 1816–1816 Count Joseph Herberstein-Moltke
- 1816–1823 Count Ignaz Karl von Chorinsky
- 1823–1830 Count Michael Nádasdy
- 1830–1834 Count Franz von Klebelsberg zu Thumburg
- 1834–1840 Count Peter Joseph Eichhoff
- 1840–1848 Count Karl Kübeck
