= Emerich Sinelli =

Austrian Capuchin friar and Prince-Bishop

His Grace Emerich Sinelli
- Prince-Bishop of Vienna
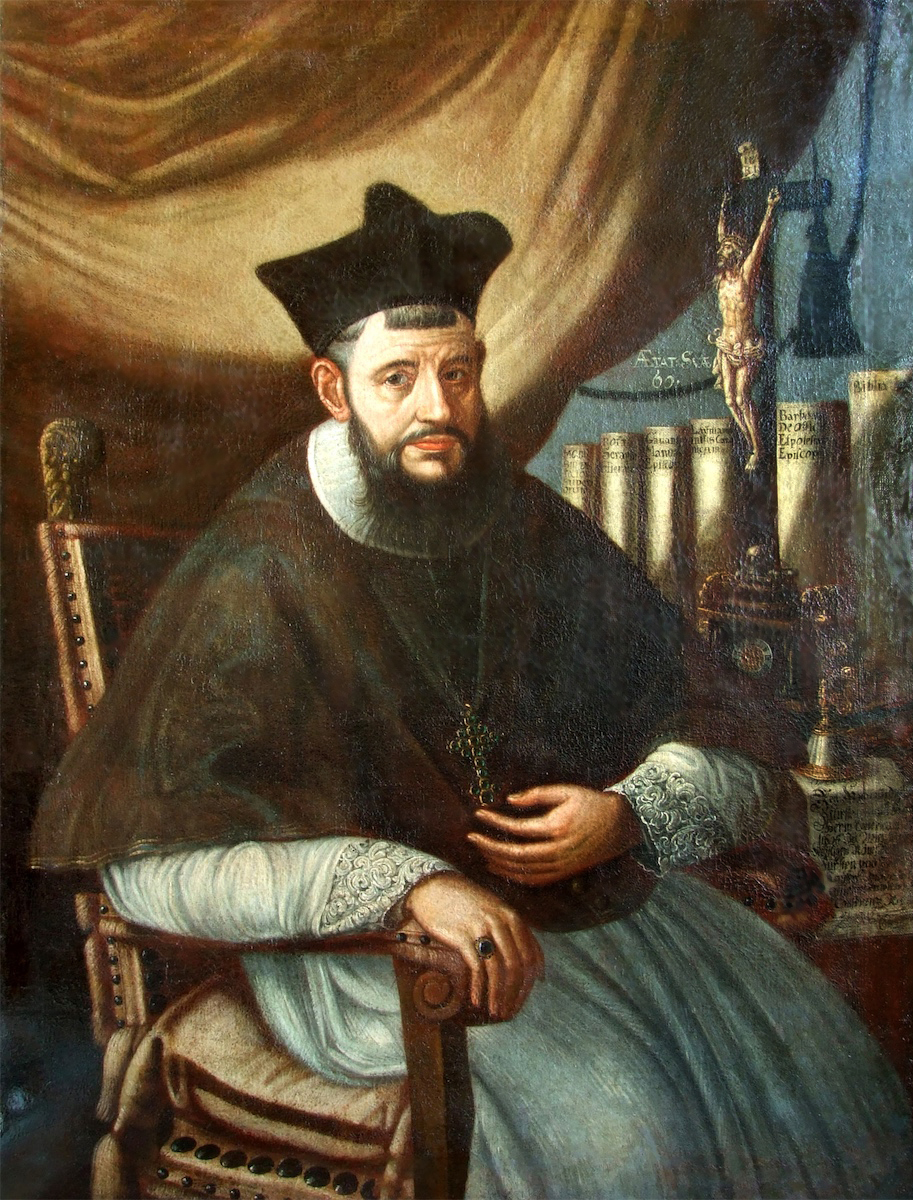
- Church: Roman Catholic Church
- Diocese: Vienna
- See: St. Stephen's Cathedral
- Installed: 3 March 1681
- Term ended: 25 February 1685
- Predecessor: Wilderich von Walderdorff
- Successor: Ernst von Trautson

Personal details
- Born: 29 June 1622 Komorn, Hungary
- Died: 25 February 1685 (aged 62) Vienna, Austria

Emerich Sinelli, OFMCap (29 June 1622, Komorn – 25 February 1685, Vienna) was a Capuchin friar and Prince-Bishop of Vienna.

== Biography ==
He was born the son of a butcher of the then Hungarian town of Komárom, Michael Senelli, and baptized under the name Johann Anton. He studied first in Linz and then Philosophy in Ingolstadt, entered the Capuchins at age twenty-one and took the religious name Emerich. In 1644 he made his perpetual vows in the Capuchin convent in Gmunden. Sinelli was the first missionary designated for the conversion of Protestants in Lower Austria, then in Prague and in the Viennese Schottenkirche. In his orations he denounced the grievances at court and the greed of the dignitaries and became an advisor to Emperor Leopold I. The expulsion of Jews from the Leopoldstadt in 1670 was carried out on his advisement.

On 17 November 1680, the Emperor appointed him Prince-Bishop of Vienna, but as a mendicant Sinelli was reluctant to accept this honor. Pope Innocent XI had to order Sinelli through an apostolic nuncio to accept his consecration, which took place on 4 May 1681 and was officiated by Nuncio Francesco Buonvisi. Sinelli was then made First Minister on the Imperial Privy Council in 1682, but continued to lead his characteristically modest life. In his episcopal functions he was represented by the Bishop of Wiener-Neustadt, Leopold Karl von Kollonitsch.

During his tenure came the Second Turkish Siege in 1683, in which Marco d'Aviano served as the Papal legate in Vienna. Sinelli at first fled the besieged city with the Imperial Court, but after an Imperial victory at the Battle of Kahlenberg, he returned to the city on 14 September with the Emperor and initiated the reconstruction of destroyed churches.

Sinelli died before receiving his elevation to cardinal, and is buried in the episcopal tomb of St. Stephen's Cathedral in Vienna.

== Bibliography ==
- Helga Kirchberger (1959). "Emerich Sinelli". Neue Deutsche Biographie (in German). Vol. 4. Berlin: Duncker & Humblot. p. 477. (full text online).
- Rudolf Leeb u. a.: Geschichte des Christentums in Österreich. Von der Antike bis zur Gegenwart. Uebereuter, Wien 2003, ISBN 3-8000-3914-1
- Franz Loidl: Geschichte des Erzbistums Wien. Herold, Wien 1983, ISBN 3-7008-0223-4
- Ernst Tomek: Kirchengeschichte Österreichs. Tyrolia, Innsbruck - Wien - München 1935-59
