= Sigismund von Kollonitsch =

Austrian clergyman and cardinal

His Eminence Sigismund von Kollonitsch
- Cardinal, Prince-Archbishop of Vienna
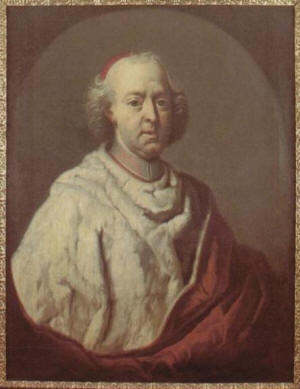
- Portrait by Jacob van Schuppen
- Church: Roman Catholic Church
- Archdiocese: Vienna
- See: St. Stephen's Cathedral
- Installed: 1 July 1716
- Term ended: 12 April 1751
- Predecessor: Franz Ferdinand von Rummel
- Successor: Johann Joseph von Trautson
- Other post: Cardinal-Priest of Santi Marcellino e Pietro (1730-40) Cardinal-Priest of San Crisogono (1740-51) Bishop of Waitzen (1709-16)

Orders
- Ordination: 22 October 1699
- Consecration: 7 December 1709
- Created cardinal: 26 November 1727 by Benedict XIII
- Rank: Cardinal-Priest

Personal details
- Born: 30 May 1677 Vienna, Austria, Holy Roman Empire
- Died: 12 April 1751 (aged 73) Vienna, Austria, Holy Roman Empire
- Buried: St. Stephen's Cathedral, Vienna
- Education: German College of Apollinaris, Rome

Sigismund von Kollonitsch; Kollonitz, Kollonic, Kollonics, Collonicz (30 May 1677, in Vienna – 12 April 1751) was titular Bishop of Scutari, Bishop of Waitzen, and was from 1716 to 1722 Prince-Bishop of Vienna, then from 1722 to 1751 the first Prince-Archbishop of Vienna. He was raised in 1727 to the cardinalate by Pope Benedict XIII.

== Biography ==
Sigismund was a son of Ulrich von Kollonitsch and was supported by his uncle, the Cardinal Prince-Primate of Hungary and Archbishop of Gran (Esztergom), Leopold Karl von Kollonitsch.

After attending the Jesuit Convocation in Neuhaus (Bohemia), he studied at the German College of Apollinaris in Rome and received his doctorate in theology. On 22 October 1699, he was ordained a priest, already a canon in Gran (Hungary) by 1700, and was consecrated titular Bishop of Scutari. From 1705, he was a Royal Hungarian Councillor and, from 14 October 1709, Bishop of Waitzen, where he founded the Piarists.

On 1 July 1716, he became the prince-bishop of Vienna. Together with Emperor Charles VI he petitioned Pope Clement XI to elevate Vienna to an archdiocese. The Prince-Bishop of Passau, Raymund Ferdinand von Rabatta, tried to prevent this, but on 6 March 1721, the Congregation in Rome agreed, and on 1 June 1722, the decision of the Consistory of Cardinals followed. On 14 February 1723, was that of Pope Innocent XIII in signing the Papal Bull Suprema dispositione, finally elevating Vienna. Kollonitsch then held the title of prince-archbishop, to whom the diocese of Wiener-Neustadt has been subordinated as suffragan. In 1729, the Viennese diocesan area was extended, when the area Under the Wienerwald (the parishes between Vienna and Wiener-Neustadt) was separated from the diocese of Passau.

He was elevated to the cardinalate by Pope Benedict XIII on 26 November 1727, and at the same time appointed cardinal-priest of Santi Marcellino e Pietro, in 1740 Kollonitsch changed to the titular church and became cardinal priest of San Crisogono. As early as 1747, he had been awarded the title Protector Germaniae by Emperor Francis I.

He was a zealous bishop who demanded of his priests participation in annual retreats and the wearing of clerical clothing. In 1719, he also introduced retreats for lay people. He increased the funds available for the creation of priests in St. Barbara and St. Stephan. In 1727, he acquired a palace in Wien-Landstraße, which he had converted into a poorhouse; this was enlarged in 1784 and adapted to the Invalidenhaus. In 1730, he conducted a general visitation of his diocese.

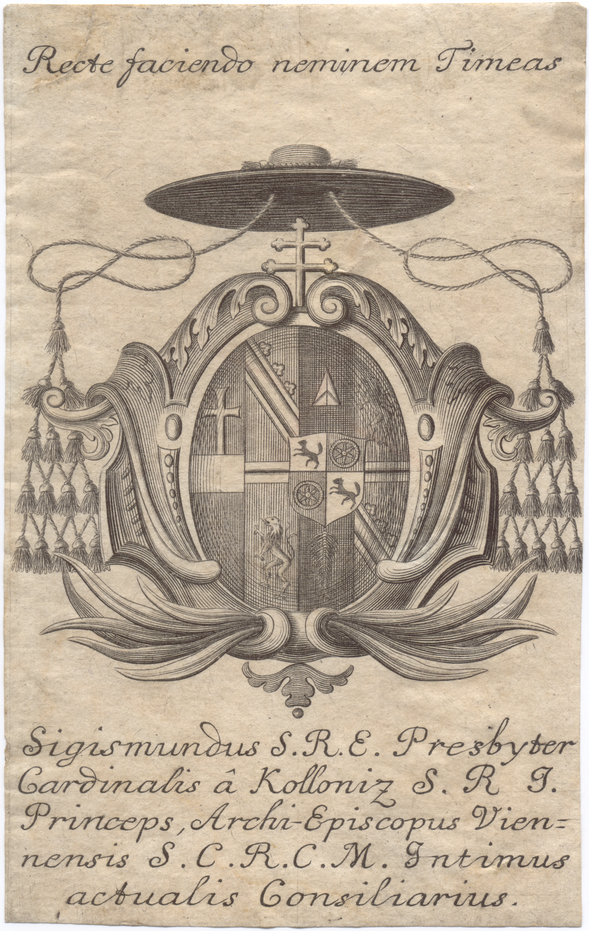
Ex-libris armorial of Cardinal Kollonitsch

He also won the lawsuit with the cathedral chapter of St. Stephen, when the Pope gave him jurisdiction over the canons. In return, he raised in 1728 the cathedral provost, Joseph Heinrich Braitenbücher, to Vicar-General and Auxiliary Bishop.

Being the last of his family, he adopted in 1728 the son of the half-sister of his father Ladislaus Zay von Csömör. He appointed him heir to his dominions with the condition that he and all his descendants, with the complete omission of their former name and coat of arms, should be addressed only as Counts and Countesses von Kollonitsch.

He is buried in the episcopal tomb of St. Stephen's Cathedral in Vienna.

== Bibliography ==
- "Sigismund Graf von Kollonitz". Biographisches Lexikon des Kaiserthums Oesterreich. Vol. 12. pp. 363–364.
- Ernst Tomek: Kirchengeschichte Österreichs. Tyrolia, Innsbruck – Wien – München 1935–59.
- Josef Wodka: Kirche in Österreich. Wegweiser durch ihre Geschichte. Herder, Wien 1959.
- Franz Loidl: Geschichte des Erzbistums Wien. Herold, Wien 1983. ISBN 3-7008-0223-4
- Susanne Siebert (1992). "Sigismund von Kollonitsch". In Bautz, Traugott (ed.). Biographisch-Bibliographisches Kirchenlexikon (BBKL) (in German). Vol. 4. Herzberg: Bautz. cols. 348–349. ISBN 3-88309-038-7.
