= Leopold Karl von Kollonitsch =

Primate of Hungary

His Eminence Leopold Karl von Kollonitsch
- Cardinal, Archbishop of Esztergom; Primate of Hungary
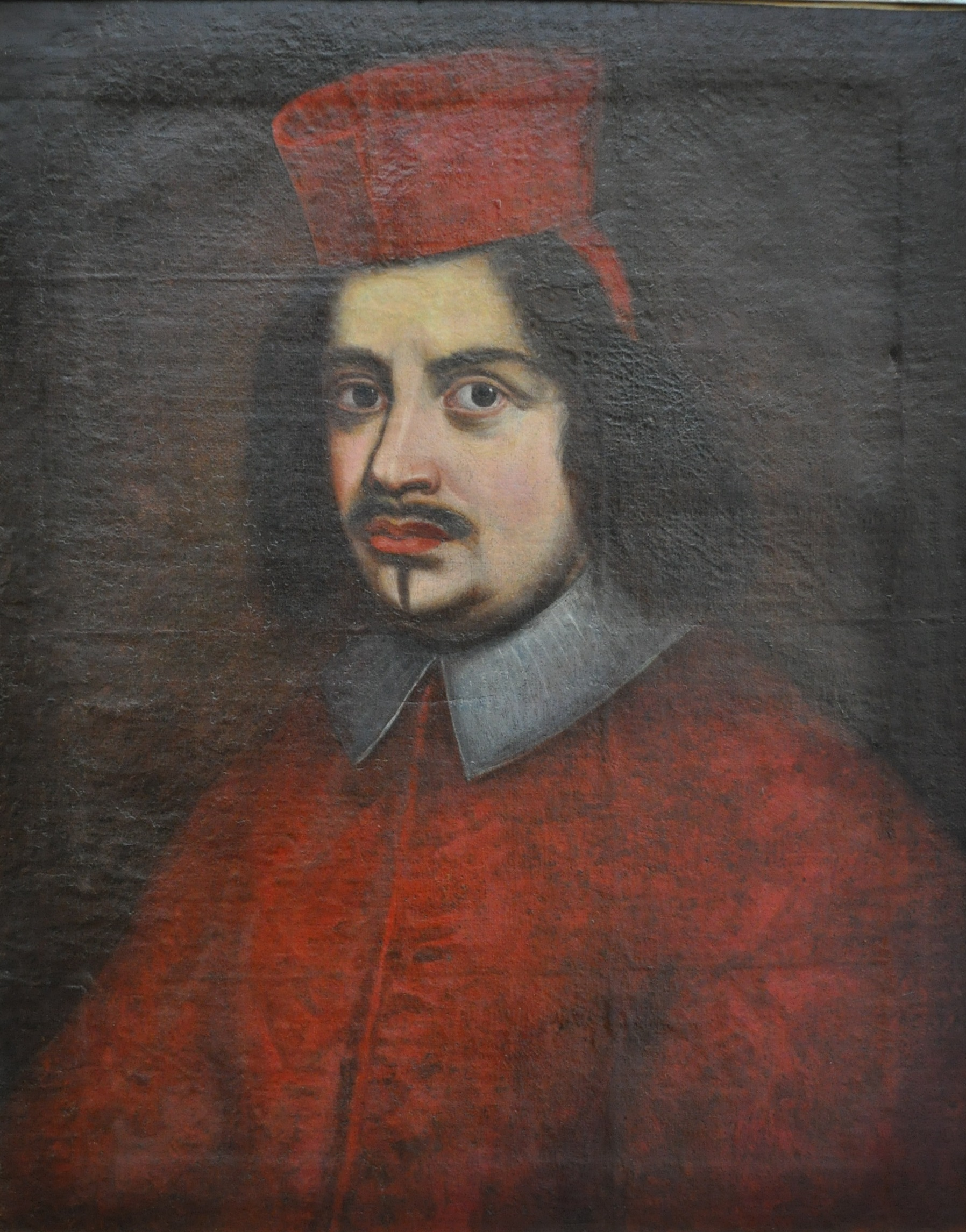
- Installed: 14 July 1695
- Term ended: 20 January 1707
- Predecessor: György Széchényi
- Successor: Christian August of Saxe-Zeitz

Orders
- Ordination: 25 February 1668
- Created cardinal: 1686

Personal details
- Born: 26 October 1631 Komárom, Kingdom of Hungary
- Died: 20 January 1707 (aged 75) Vienna, Habsburg monarchy
- Buried: Pressburg
- Denomination: Roman Catholic
- Parents: Count Ernst von Kollonitsch; Anne Elizabeth von Kueffstein
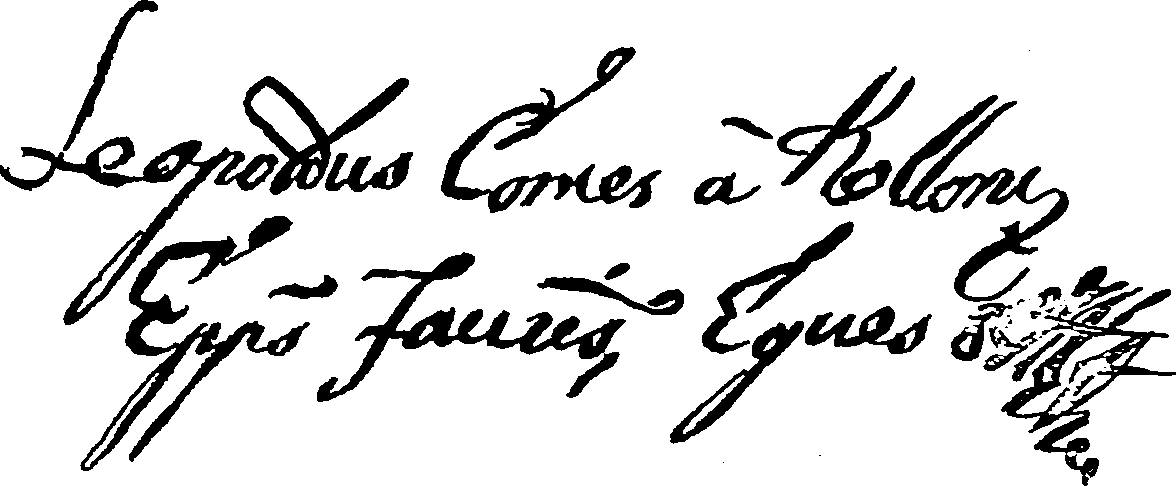
- Signature

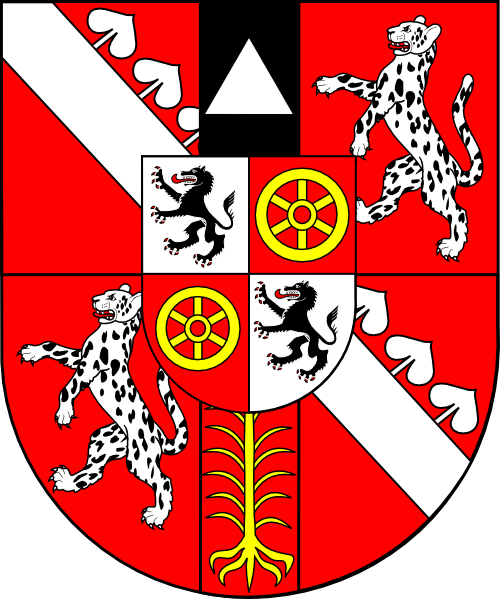
- Coat of arms

Leopold Karl von Kollonitsch (also spelt Collonicz, Colonitz, Kollonitz, Kolonits and Kolonić; 26 October 1631 – 20 January 1707) or Lipót Kollonich was a cardinal of the Holy Roman Church, Archbishop of Kalocsa and later of Esztergom, and Primate of Hungary. Also a count of the Holy Roman Empire, he was a leading figure of the Hungarian Counter-Reformation.

As an imperial minister, Kollonitsch was responsible for reorganizing the new Hungarian territories won from the Ottoman Empire and later ceded at the Treaty of Karlowitz. He was said to have gained over one hundred thousand converts to Rome from Orthodox Christianity.

== Early life and military career ==
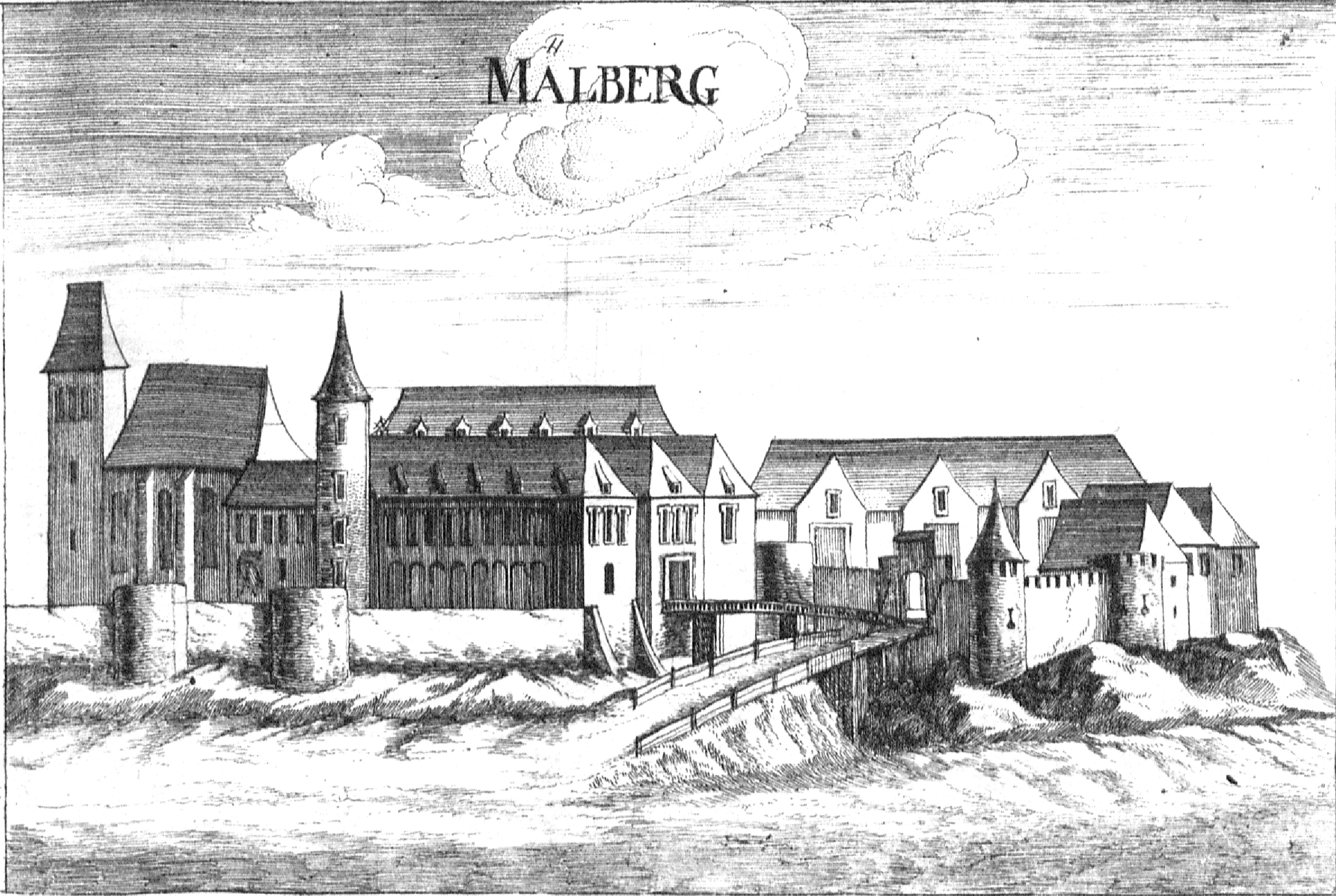
Contemporary Mailberg

Born at the Hungarian castle of Komárom (now Komárno, on the northern shore), Leopold Karl von Kollonitsch was the son of Count Ernst von Kollonitsch, Governor of the castle, by his marriage to Anne Elizabeth von Kueffstein. He became a candidate officer of the Sovereign Military Order of Malta, first seeing action in the Cretan War, when the Knights of Malta supported Venice against the Turks.

In 1650 he was knighted at Vienna. In 1654 he took part in the defence of Crete, and in 1655 he fought at the Battle of the Dardanelles, a victory for Venice. He became a Knight Hospitaller in 1658 and was next appointed as Prior and Castellan of the Order of Mailberg, based at Schloss Mailberg. Soon he was also in command of Eger in Bohemia.

== Churchman ==
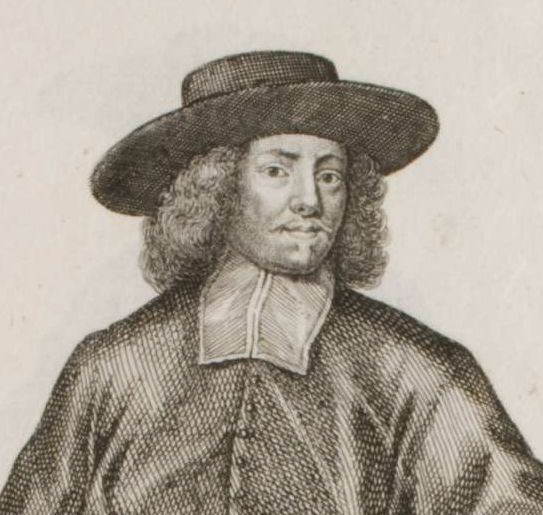
Detail of another engraving of Kollonitsch by Weigel, 1703

In 1659, the Emperor Leopold I appointed Kollonitsch as his Lord Chamberlain and also named him as Bishop of Nitra. Kollonitsch then began some studies in theology, but he was not ordained a priest until 1668. In 1669, he was enthroned as bishop of Nitra. In 1670, he was translated to become Bishop of Wiener Neustadt, the "new city" of Vienna, succeeding Laurenz Aidinger. From 1672 to 1681, he was president of the Hungarian Court Chamber.

In 1673–74, Kollonitsch was responsible, with Archbishop György Szelepcsényi, for a Special Court in Pressburg which tried some 278 Protestants, resulting in their condemnation and expulsion.

In 1683, at the time of the second Siege of Vienna by the Turks, Kollonitsch went to the city, taking money to pay troops and also establishing emergency hospitals in monasteries there. After the Battle of Kahlenberg on 11 and 12 September 1683 which lifted the siege, he organized the care of some five hundred orphans at Schloss Mailberg, children whose parents had been killed in the conflict. In the years which followed, he founded the first military hospitals, as a result of which he enjoyed great popularity in Vienna.

In 1685, Kollonitsch was appointed Bishop of Győr, in Hungary, and gave up his diocese in Austria, where he was succeeded by Cristoval Royas de Spinola. In 1686 he was named a cardinal, with the title of Cardinal-Priest of Saint Jerome of the Croats, and in 1688 he was promoted Archbishop of Kalocsa.
In 1692 the Emperor Charles VI made him President of the Hofkammer and Minister of State, and in that capacity Kollonitsch was responsible for reorganizing the new Hungarian territories conquered from the Ottoman Empire. In 1695, he was finally promoted to become Archbishop of Esztergom (or Gran) and Primate of Hungary, and was able to gain over 100,000 Orthodox Christians for Rome. At the time Kollonitsch was the only Hungarian member of the Emperor's inner circle, and he was quoted as saying that he would "first render Hungary obedient, then destitute, and finally Catholic". The Emperor never acted on the Cardinal archbishop's appeal for measures to bring about a massive conversion to Rome, but a document he issued in 1691 known as the Explanatio Leopoldina suggested that religious freedom in the conquered lands was to be only temporary.

Kollonitsch took part in the Papal conclaves of 1689 and 1691, but was unable to attend that of 1700. He died at Vienna in 1707. His body was laid to rest in the Jesuits' Annakirche, then taken to Pressburg (now Bratislava) for burial.

== Memorials ==
In front of the Rathaus at Vienna stands a statue of Kollonitsch by Vincenz Pilz. In 1862 a street in the city's Landstraße district was named after him Kolonitzgasse, and in 1873 this was joined by the Kolonitzplatz.

Under Kollonitsch the settlement of the Capuchins in Bratislava was begun, and in 1708 the cornerstone of a Capuchin monastery was laid.

== Notes ==
Catholic Church titles
Preceded by György Szelepcsényi	Bishop of Nitra; 1666–1669	Succeeded by Tamás Pálffy
Preceded by Laurenz Aidinger	Bishop of Wiener Neustadt; 1669–1685	Succeeded by Cristoval Royas de Spinola
Preceded by György Széchényi	Bishop of Győr; 1685–1691	Succeeded by Christian August of Saxe-Zeitz
Preceded by sede vacante	Archbishop of Kalocsa; 1691–1695	Succeeded by Pál Széchényi
Preceded by György Széchényi	Archbishop of Esztergom; 1695–1707	Succeeded by Christian August of Saxe-Zeitz
Political offices
Preceded by Ferenc Klobusiczky	Chief Justice; 1705–1707	Succeeded by János Horváth-Simonchich
