= Melchior Klesl =

Austrian statesman and cardinal (1552–1630)

His Eminence the Most Reverend Melchior Cardinal Klesl
- Cardinal-Priest of Santa Maria della Pace
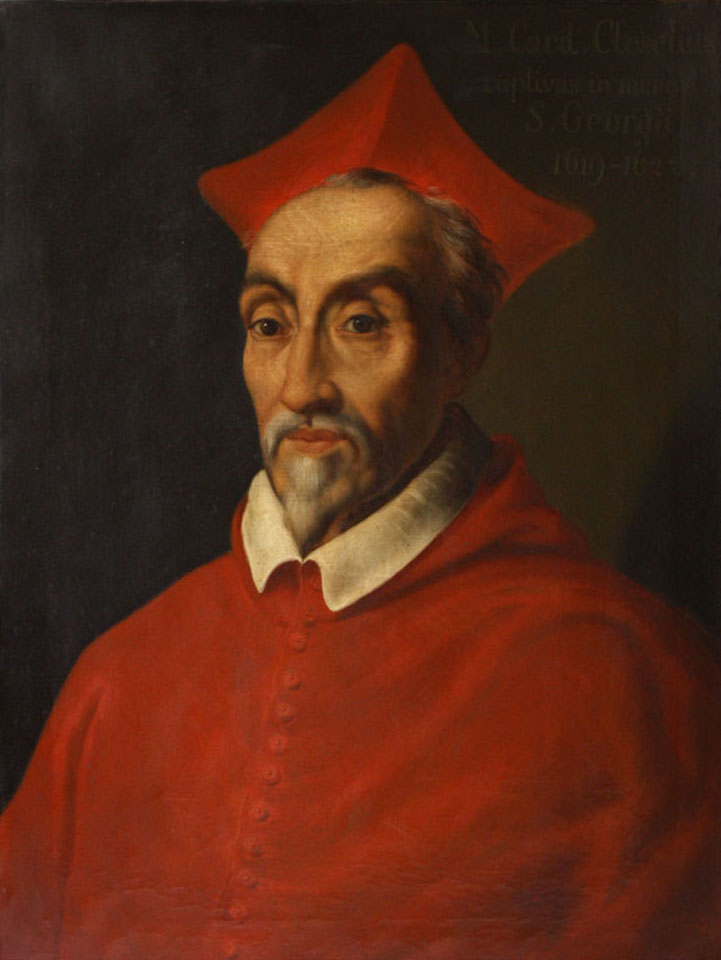
- Melchior Klesl
- Church: Catholic Church
- In office: 1624–1630
- Predecessor: Alessandro d'Este
- Successor: Fabrizio Verospi

Orders
- Consecration: 30 March 1614 by Placido della Marra

Melchior Klesl (19 February 1552 – 18 September 1630) was an Austrian statesman and cardinal of the Roman Catholic Church during the time of the Counter-Reformation. He was minister-favourite of King and Emperor Matthias (1609-1618) and a leading advocate for peace between the empire's different confessional leagues before the Thirty Years' War.

Klesl was appointed Bishop of Vienna in 1602 and elevated to cardinal in December.

== Biography ==
He was born in Vienna to Lutheran Protestant parents, with his father being a baker his surname was also written Khlesl, Klesel or Cleselius.

Klesl studied philosophy at the University of Vienna and converted to Catholicism after he had been impressed by the preaching of the Jesuits. He entered the Faculty of Philosophy at University of Vienna in 1570. In 1574, he joined the “Papal Alumnat”, a boarding school for prospective priests that as run by the Jesuits in Vienna. Emperor Rudolf II then became aware of him as a promising candidate for the priesthood and wanted to use him for his plans for a campaign against his Protestant noble estates and towns, as well as for a church reform in Lower Austria.

In 1579, Khesl, now a doctor of philosophy, was given the post of cathedral provost of St. Stephen's, in Vienna, and received his ordination to the priesthood.

The emperor and his advisors pressured the prince-bishop of Passau, Urban of Trenbach, to make Klesl his official representative in Vienna to carry out a reform of the Catholic clergy. Trenbach, appointed Klesl as his official representative for Lower Austria in 1580 and in 1581 as his vicar-general in Vienna. His task was to discipline the dissolute and lax Catholic clergy. As cathedral provost and chancellor of the university, he worked on behalf of the emperor to make adherence to the Catholic confession a duty for professors and students. As an official, he was also given the task by Rudolf II to return the Protestant towns in Lower Austria to the faith of the emperor. The campaign had its peak between 1585 and 1588.

Klesl’s moderate measures during his campaign to Catholicise Lower Austria again became the source of some tension with Jesuits like the hardliner Father Georg Scherer, which soon led to an open contention. To calm things down, Klesl claimed that Scherer had convinced him to convert and that both had the same goal. In 1588, Rudolf appointed Klesl as administrator of the Diocese of Wiener Neustadt.

Because it lost some powerful supporters such as Leonhard IV von Harrach in Vienna and Adam von Dietrichstein at the imperial court in Prague and Governor Archduke Ernst, the Counter-Reformation was gradually losing support against the opposition to the government in Vienna. Even the intervention of Emperor Rudolf II failed to help. The opposition, especially from Chancellor Wolfgang Unverzagt, who was regarded as in Archduke Matthias's government in Vienna, was too strong.

Unverzagt proposed making Klesl bishop of the small rundown Bishopric of Vienna, which was intended to take the wind out of his sails. Klesl’s allies in Prague, privy councillors Wolf Rumpf and Paul Sixt III von Trautson, could not do anything against it. To avoid political insignificance, Klesl attempted to be named to an influential position on the staff of Archduke Matthias.

In 1598, Archduke Maximilian III, who presided over the Hungarian Diet in Pressburg for his brother Matthias, announced Klesl’s nomination as Bishop of Vienna. After a sensation, provoked by Klesl himself, who announced that he would run the bishopric with heavy-handedness against the government in Vienna, the nomination was withdrawn. Gerber, in 1602, he was installed as bishop after his demands for economic support for the bishopric had been fulfilled. Klesl was named Bishop of Vienna, a diocese that was spiritually and materially in a state of degradation. On 30 Mar 1614, he was consecrated bishop by Placido della Marra, Bishop of Melfi e Rapolla. He received the purple from Paul V in 1616.

His appointment as Bishop of Vienna took place in a phase of high hopes in Prague, Vienna and Graz, that the Catholic House of Austria would reassert its position against the Protestant opposition in the Habsburg monarchy; Klesl favoured confronting the opposition. Meanwhile, the Brothers' Quarrel, the struggle between Emperor Rudolf II and his brothers for succession in the Habsburg monarchy and the empire, had sharpened. Specifically, the ambition of Matthias to become emperor himself offered Klesl the opportunity to increase his influence at the court in Vienna.

Klesel tried to thread a marriage of Matthias to Bavarian Princess Magdalena to get the Dukes of Bavaria as Catholic allies in the struggle for the throne of Rudolf II. In the end, the negotiations came to nothing because Magdalena did not want to be his wife.

Since 1605, the uprising of Stefan Bocskai in Hungary and Transylvania, both Rudolf and Governor Matthias in Vienna had been pursuing a more moderate policy towards the Protestant opposition in the estates of the Habsburg monarchy because they needed their support against Bocskai. Klesl opposed the policy, but the final decision lay in the hands of the council around Matthias and, increasingly, Karl I von Liechtenstein, privy councillor of Rudolf II and sometimes his high steward. Liechtenstein increasingly dominated the politics of Archduke Matthias to the point of a putsch against his brother, Emperor Rudolf II. Matthias took over Austria, Moravia and Hungary but had to make, however, especially with the advice of Liechtenstein, difficult concessions to his allied estates.

In spring 1609, Klesl finally reached the high point of his power in Vienna by becoming the minister-favourite of Matthias, but to be formally the president of privy council, he had to wait until January 1613. Liechtenstein left the court. Klesl's struggle for the position of the dominant minister in Vienna, however, continued until December 1611, when Liechtenstein gave up and admitted his defeat.

In 1609, Klesl tried to withdraw the concessions that had been made to the oppositional estates made by Liechtenstein and his supporters, but the quarrel with the emperor, as well as the political and economic weakness of Matthias, forced Klesl to take an increasingly-moderate stance toward the Protestant opposition, even the Calvinists. Klesl was working to make Matthias the next emperor.

For that goal, he needed the Protestant electors. The ecclesiastical (bishop) electors supported Archduke Albrecht VII, the brother of Matthias and the ruler of the Spanish Netherlands, to be the next emperor. After the death of Rudolf II, the election of Matthias succeeded because of the Protestant vote. As the minister-favourite of the new emperor, Klesl at first pursued a policy of mobilising the empire's estates for a new war against the Ottoman Empire to unify the hostile confessional camps under Matthias, but that move proved to be a failure.

That made him begin in 1614 to negotiate with Ottoman envoys for a new peace treaty. The Treaty of Vienna in 1615 with the Ottomans was probably his greatest political success. His efforts to settle the conflicts among the confessional associations, the Protestant Union and the Catholic League, were much less successful. His attempts to dissolve the confessional alliances to create a party of the emperor faced insurmountable resistance.

Since the coronation of Matthias as emperor, the question of succession had immediately become an important political issue because Matthias had in his marriage with Anna of Tyrol no male heir to succeed him. The King of Spain wanted to make his son emperor and before that King of Bohemia and Hungary. Archduke Ferdinand of Inner Austria also claimed those crowns and found with Maximilian III a scheming supporter. The negotiations with Philip III lasted until a treaty between Philip and Ferdinand, the Oñate Treaty in the spring of 1617. Archdukes Maximilian III and Ferdinand urged the election of Ferdinand as Emperor before the Habsburgs reached any agreement about the crowns of Bohemia and Hungary, but Klesl first wanted negotiations with the Calvinist electors to save the election. Maximilian III saw that as a tactic to prolong the election and so Klesl needed protection against his enemies in the House of Austria and its Catholic supporters. The device was that Emperor Matthias convinced the pope to make Klesl a cardinal.

On 2 December 1615 Pope Paul V made Klesl in pectore cardinal, which he had proclaimed on the April 11, 1616. Klesl received Santa Maria degli Angeli as his titular church but in 1623 switched to San Silvestro in Capite.

Maximilian III had in 1616 planned to murder Cardinal Klesl, but his cousin Ferdinand held him back. The uprising in Bohemia after the Defenestration of Prague ultimately led to the beginning of the Thirty Years' War and had brought about the end of Klesl’s position as minister-favourite because of his preferential treatment of a moderate reaction since the emperor lacked the money for a military answer, and Philip III signalled no strong assistance. On 20 July 1618 Maximilian III, Ferdinand II (now King of Bohemia and Hungary) and Spanish Ambassador Inigo Velez de Guevara, Conde de Oñate, arrested Klesl and held him prisoner in Tyrol.

The pope sent a special envoy, Cardinal Fabrizio Verospi, to investigate Klesl's case. Verospi urged in the name of Paul V for the cardinal to be placed under ecclesiastical arrest. In 1619, Klesl was brought to the monastery of St. Georgenberg, where he was held in ecclesiastical custody and under the supervision of the government in Innsbruck. By papal diplomacy, especially by Cardinal Ludovico Ludovisi, Klesl could be transferred to Castel Sant’ Angelo, in Rome, on 23 October 1622 and the accusations against him were so reduced that no legitimate reason for his arrest remained. On 18 June 1623 Pope Gregory XV released him from custody. In Rome, Klesl carried on political activities in support for his earlier enemies Maximilian I of Bavaria and Johann Schweikhart von Cronberg, Elector of Mainz. In Vienna, the policy was seen as revenge on Emperor Ferdinand II. To get Klesl out of Rome, Ferdinand accepted full satisfaction for Cardinal Klesl. Pope Urban VIII cleared Klesl of any guilt, and in the autumn of 1626, he was allowed to leave Rome. On 25 January 1628 Klesl entered the Cathedral of St. Stephen, in Vienna, in a festive procession and resumed his episcopate. The Catholic alliance seemed to be very successful in its war against the Protestant princes and their allies, but Ferdinand II, influenced by his Jesuit confessor, Wilhelm Lamormaini, wanted to exploit their victories to continue to push Protestant princes back as far as possible. However Klesl held to his conviction that the war could not be won and that it would be better for the emperor and the Catholic Church to proceed more prudently.

He died in Wiener Neustadt in 1630. His heart reposes before the high altar of the Cathedral of Wiener Neustadt, and his body rests in the St. Stephen's Cathedral, Vienna.

Inhabitants of Vienna recognise Klesl's name mainly because Khleslplatz (Khlesl Square), in Vienna's 12th district, Meidling, in the former village of Altmannsdorf, has been named after him, allegedly because he used to stop at No. 12 on his journeys from Wiener Neustadt to Vienna. Since 1978, the 16th-century building has housed the Renner-Institut, the political academy of the Social Democratic Party of Austria, and No. 6 was until 1998 the site of the Tierschutzhaus of the Wiener Tierschutzverein (founded in 1846), where generations of animal lovers would go to collect homeless pets.

== Episcopal succession ==
As bishop, he was the principal consecrator of the following:

- Péter Pázmány, Archbishop of Esztergom (1617);
- Lilio Livioi, Auxiliary Bishop of Constantinople (1625);
- Vincenzo Martinelli (bishop), Bishop of Conversano (1625); and
- Giovanni Battista Maria Pallotta, Titular Archbishop of Thessalonica (1628).

Catholic Church titles
Preceded by: Johann Caspar Neubeck	Bishop of Vienna; 1598–1630	Succeeded by: Anton Wolfradt
