= Mailberg =

- Municipality
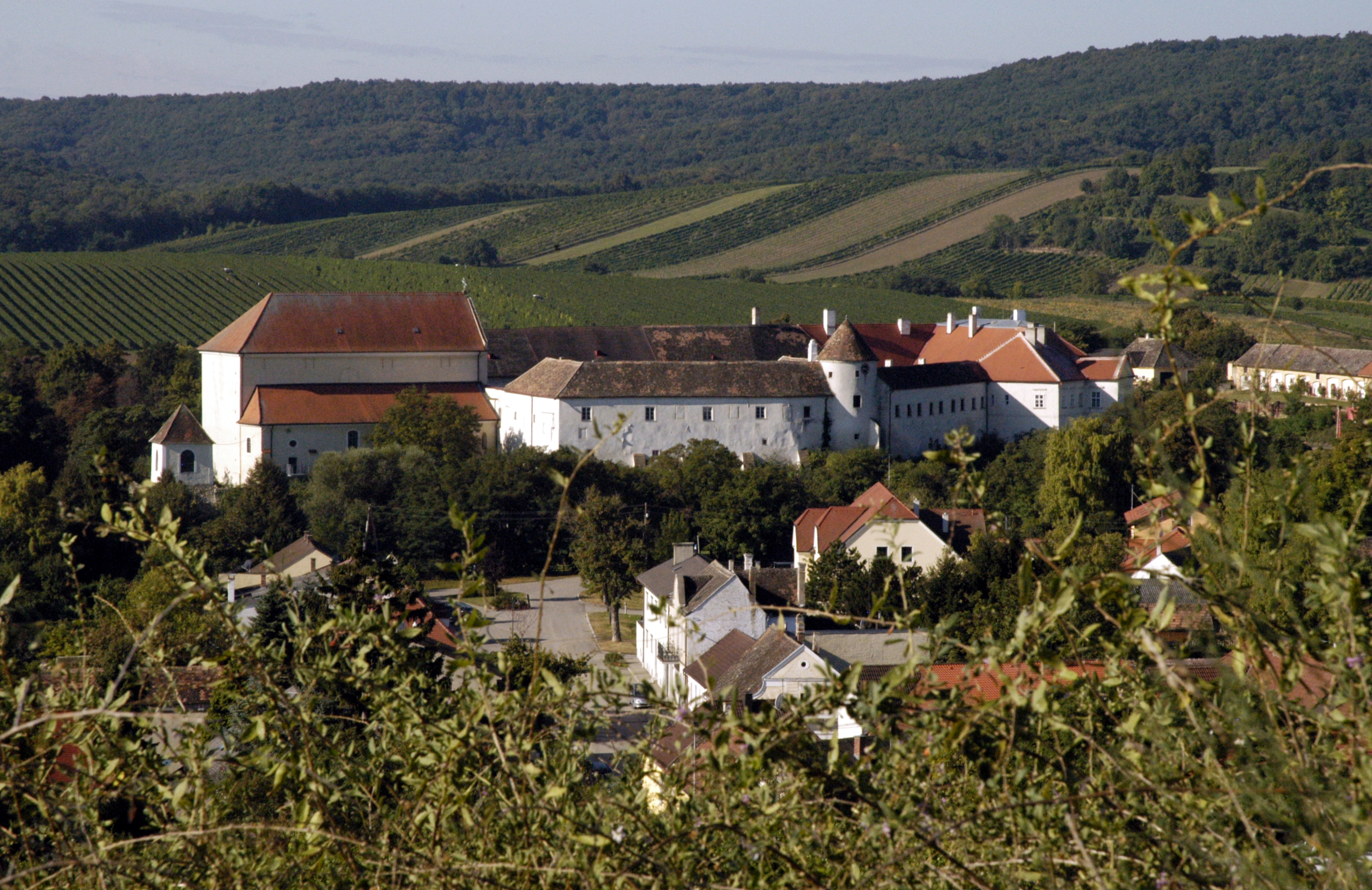
- Mailberg Castle

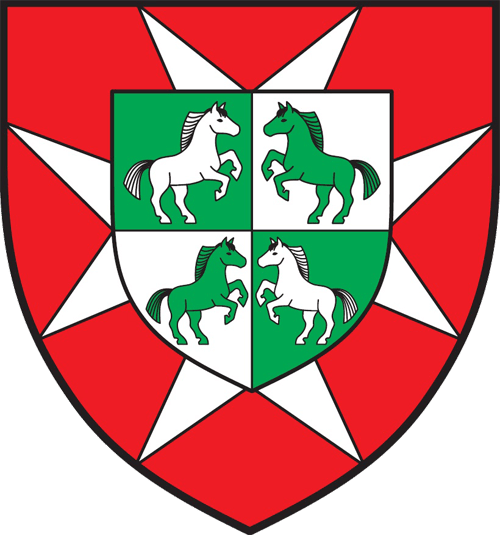
- Coat of arms

- Location within Austria
- Coordinates: 48°40′N 16°11′E
- Country: Austria
- State: Lower Austria
- District: Hollabrunn

Government
  - Mayor: Herbert Goldinger

Area
  - Total: 15.74 km^{2} (6.08 sq mi)
- Elevation: 217 m (712 ft)

Population (2018-01-01)
  - Total: 558
  - Density: 35.5/km^{2} (91.8/sq mi)
- Time zone: UTC+1 (CET)
  - Summer (DST): UTC+2 (CEST)
- Postal code: 2024
- Area code: 02943

Mailberg is a town in the district of Hollabrunn in Lower Austria, Austria. First mentioned in records in 1055, Castle Mailberg (in German: Schloss Mailberg) is owned and run by the Austrian Grand Priory of the Sovereign Military Order of Malta since 1146. It is known for its wine production and now serves as a castle hotel and as Vinothek for the local Winemakers Community "Mailberg Valley".

Mailberg is home to several family-owned wineries, the largest being Weingut Hagn. The most notable grape variety to the region of Mailberg is Grüner Veltliner, a white wine variety that in the area surrounding Mailberg develops a more spicy and peppery character. Though primarily known for producing white wines, wine producers also produce red wine. The most prominent red grape variety is Zweigelt, which is grown widely in Austria.
