= Philipp Friedrich von Breuner =

Austro-Hungarian Prince-Bishop

His Grace Philipp Friedrich von Breuner
- Prince-Bishop of Vienna
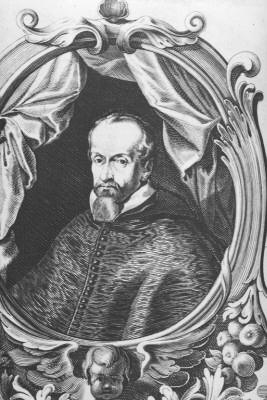
- Engraving after Tobias Pock, 1650
- Church: Roman Catholic Church
- Diocese: Vienna
- See: St. Stephen's Cathedral
- Installed: 5 September 1639
- Term ended: 22 May 1669
- Predecessor: Anton Wolfradt
- Successor: Wilderich von Walderdorff
- Other posts: Auxiliary Bishop of Olomouc (1630–39); Titular Bishop of Ioppe (1630–39)

Personal details
- Born: 6 September 1597 Győr, Hungary
- Died: 22 May 1669 (aged 71) Vienna, Austria, Holy Roman Empire
- Education: Collegium Germanicum
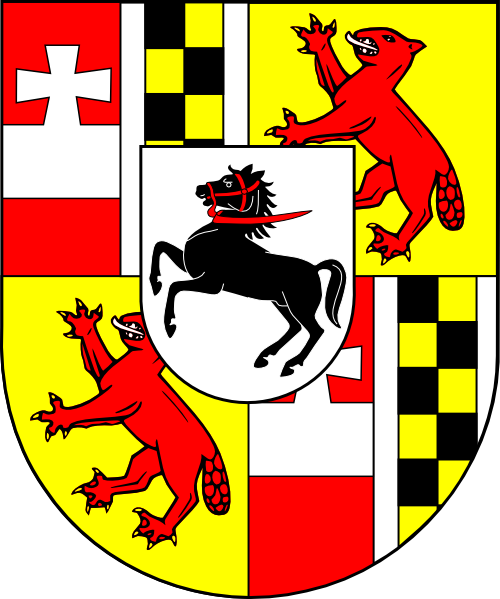
- Coat of arms

Philipp Friedrich Graf von Breuner (6 September 1597 – 22 May 1669) was an Auxiliary Bishop of Olomouc and Prince-Bishop of Vienna.

== Biography ==
He was born on 6 September 1597 in Győr. He was the son of a Feldzeugmeister and Hofkriegsrates from the Austrian noble family Breuner. From 1617 to 1621 he studied in the Collegium Germanicum at the Pontifical Gregorian University in Rome and graduated with a doctorate.

On 8 December 1621, he was ordained a priest in Nikolsburg and was appointed on 9 September 1630 auxiliary bishop in Olomouc and titular bishop of Ioppe. The episcopal ordination was received on 5 September 1635. He was also a canon in Olomouc, Wrocław and Regensburg, and Provost in Brno. Emperor Ferdinand III appointed him Prince-Bishop of Vienna on 5 May 1639, Pope Urban VIII confirmed it on 5 September 1639. On 26 December 1639, he was installed in St. Stephen's Cathedral.

He is described as a pious bishop, concerned with pastoral care and the preaching activity of priests. For the growing suburbs of Vienna, he redefined the parish boundaries. He was able to complete in 1641 the new building of the Episcopal Palace, begun by Prince-Bishop Anton Wolfradt in 1632 according to the plans of Giovanni Coccapani.

The Prince-Bishop erected the monumental high altar in St. Stephen's Cathedral and concluded a contract with the stonemason and sculptor Johann Jacob Pock from Constance on 1 March 1641. His first master builder was Simon Humpeller, followed by Hans Herstorffer in 1641, followed by Adam Haresleben in 1654. The large altarpiece was painted by Tobias Pock, brother of the sculptor. After some delays, he was able to solemnly dedicate this work on 19 May 1647. His marble coat of arms was attached to the altar, and he also had the new cathedral stalls carved.

On 18 May 1647, he consecrated the column, crowned by the statue of the Immaculate Conception in front of the church on the courtyard (model of the Marian Column of Munich in front of the town hall). Emperor Ferdinand III resolved to celebrate the feast of the Immaculata Conceptio on 8 December in his dominions.

Prince-Bishop Breuner died on 22 May 1669 in Vienna. He is buried in the women's choir of St. Stephen's Cathedral in Vienna.

== Bibliography ==
- Rudolf Leeb u. a.: Geschichte des Christentums in Österreich. Von der Antike bis zur Gegenwart. Uebereuter, Wien 2003, ISBN 3-8000-3914-1.
- Franz Loidl: Geschichte des Erzbistums Wien. Herold, Wien 1983, ISBN 3-7008-0223-4.
- Ernst Tomek: Kirchengeschichte Österreichs. Tyrolia, Innsbruck - Wien - München 1935–1959.
