= Franz Ferdinand von Rummel =

German priest

His Grace Franz Ferdinand von Rummel
- Prince-Bishop of Vienna
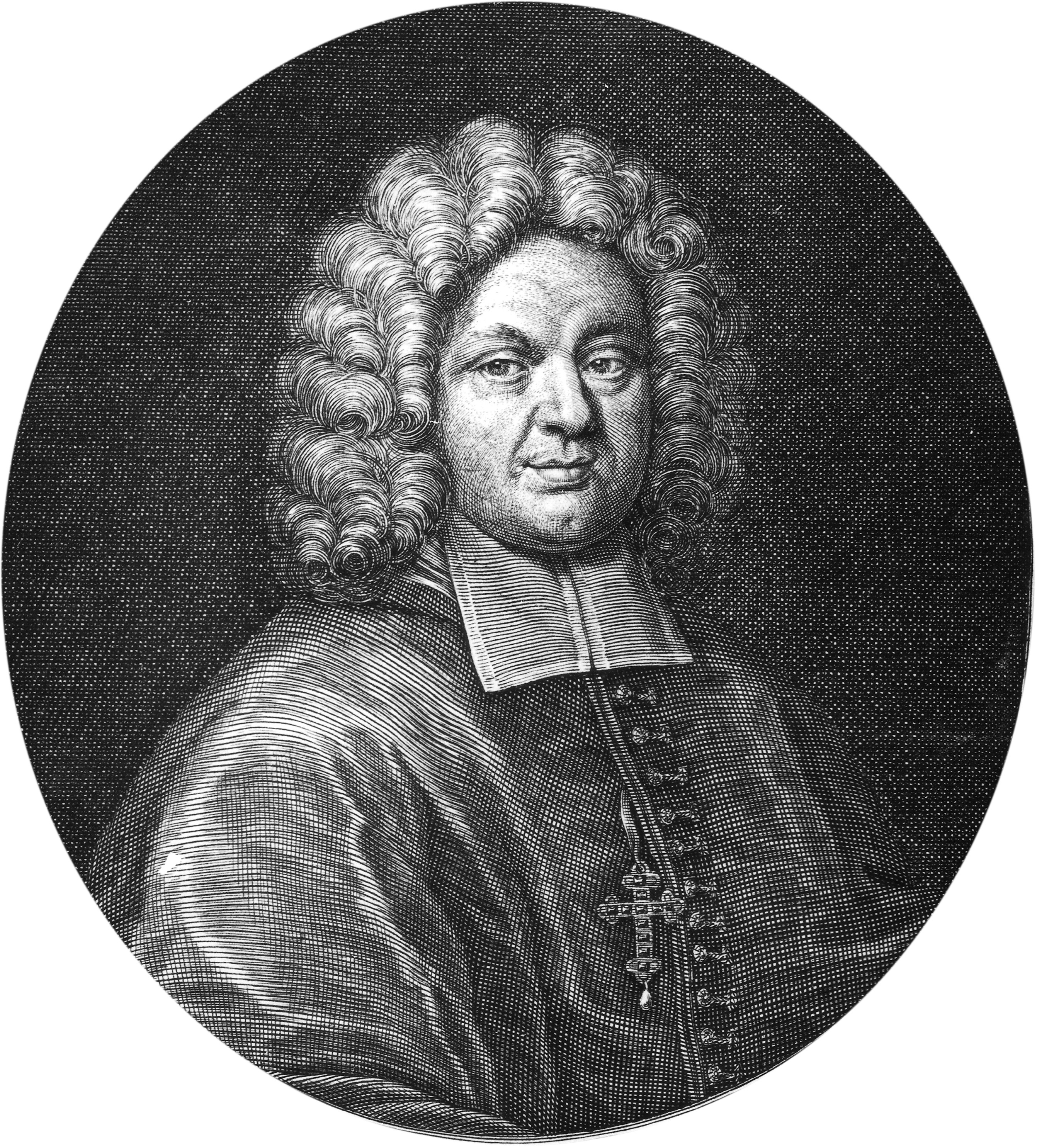
- Church: Roman Catholic Church
- Diocese: Vienna
- See: St. Stephen's Cathedral
- Installed: 4 October 1706
- Term ended: 15 March 1716
- Predecessor: Franz Anton von Harrach
- Successor: Sigismund von Kollonitsch
- Other post: Bishop of Tinin (1696–1706)

Personal details
- Born: 28 October 1644 Weiden in der Oberpfalz, Bavaria
- Died: 15 March 1716 (aged 71) Vienna, Austria, Habsburg monarchy

Franz Ferdinand von Rummel (28 October 1644 – 15 March 1716) was educator and religious tutor of Emperor Joseph I, Bishop of Tinin, Provost of Ardagger and Wrocław, and was from 1706 to 1716 the Prince-Bishop of Vienna.

== Biography ==
Franz Ferdinand von Rummel was born on 28 October 1644 in Weiden in der Oberpfalz. He studied law, philosophy and theology in Ingolstadt and wanted to enter the Capuchin Order. Marco d'Aviano prophesied his success as a priest and recommended him, after Rummel's ordination in Regensburg, to be an educator and religious tutor to the future Emperor Joseph I. In addition, the wife of Emperor Leopold I, Eleonor Magdalene of Neuburg, favored him because his grandfather, Johann Rummel, had already served the Palatinate as a chamber councilor. From 1684 he carried out this activity, but was soon hostile and slandered. Through the mediation of Emperor Leopold he became Bishop of Tinin and Provost of Ardagger and Wrocław.

On 11 July 1706, he was appointed Prince-Bishop of Vienna by Joseph I, the Papal confirmation taking place on 4 October.

He was concerned with pastoral care and was able to increase priesthood. In 1708 there were 111 priestly ordinations in the small Viennese diocese. He introduced the celebration of the Rosary and in 1711 had the Pummerin Bell poured from cannonballs captured during the Second Turkish Siege. He also mediated between the Emperor and Pope Clement XI when in 1708 Austrian troops occupied territories of the Papal States during the War of Spanish Succession.

Towards the end of his life he was seriously ill and could only sleep while seated in a chair. At seventy-two years old he died on 15 March 1716 in Vienna and was buried in the episcopal tomb of St. Stephen's Cathedral in Vienna.

== Bibliography ==
- Ernst Tomek: Kirchengeschichte Österreichs. Tyrolia, Innsbruck – Vienna – Munich 1935–59.
- Friedrich von Rummel: Franz Ferdinand von Rummel: Lehrer Kaiser Josephs I. und Fürstbischof von Wien (1644–1716). Schriftenreihe des Instituts für Österreichkunde. Oldenbourg, Munich 1980, ISBN 3-486-50131-3.
- Franz Loidl: Geschichte des Erzbistums Wien. Herold, Wien 1983, ISBN 3-7008-0223-4.
- Johann Ascherl (2005): Aus der Jungen Pfalz an den Kaiserhof. Die Karriere des Außenseiters Franz Ferdinand Freiherr von Rummel. In Heimatkundlicher Arbeitskreis Vohenstrauß, Streifzüge, 20. Jahrgang, Heft 27, pp. 13–15.
- Johann Weißensteiner (2005). "Rummel, Franz Ferdinand Freiherr von". Neue Deutsche Biographie (in German). Vol. 22. Berlin: Duncker & Humblot. pp. 248–249. (full text online).
