= Peter Canisius =

Dutch Jesuit Catholic priest (1521–1597)

Saint Peter Canisius SJ
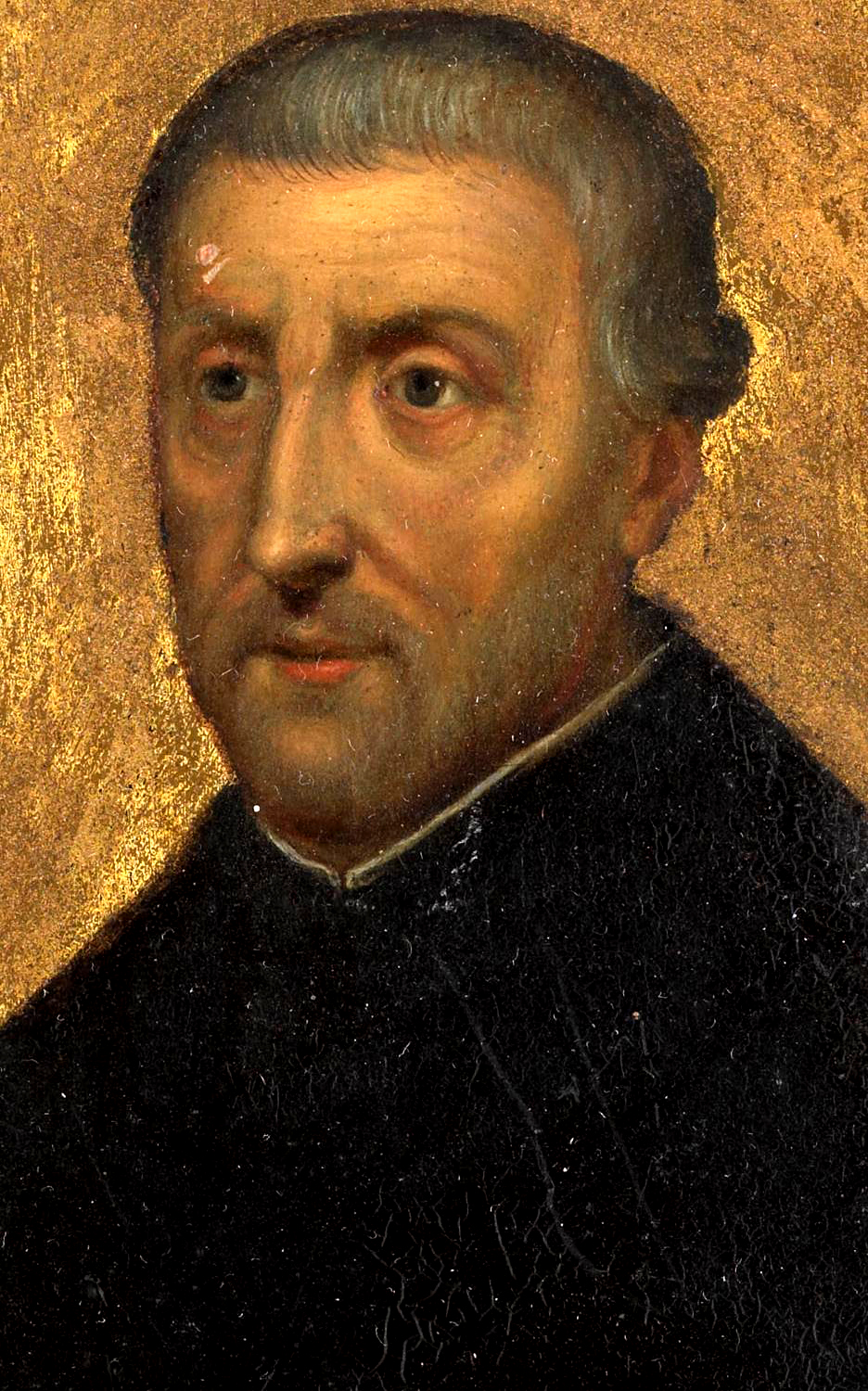

Doctor of the Church 2nd Apostle of Germany
- Born: 8 May 1521; Nijmegen, Duchy of Guelders, Habsburg Netherlands
- Died: 21 December 1597 (aged 76); Fribourg, Old Swiss Confederation
- Venerated in: Catholic Church
- Beatified: 1864, Rome by Pope Pius IX
- Canonized: 21 May 1925, Rome by Pope Pius XI
- Major shrine: College of St. Michael; Fribourg, Switzerland
- Feast: 21 December; 27 April (General Roman Calendar, 1926–1969; current SJ calendar)
- Patronage: Catholic press, Germany

Peter Canisius SJ (Dutch: Pieter Kanis; 8 May 1521 – 21 December 1597) was a Dutch Jesuit priest known for his strong support for the Catholic faith during the Protestant Reformation in Germany, Austria, Bohemia, Moravia, Switzerland and the British Isles. The restoration of the Catholic Church in Germany is largely attributed to the work there of the Jesuits, which Canisius led. He is venerated in the Catholic Church as a saint and as a Doctor of the Church.

== Life ==
He was born in 1521 in Nijmegen in the Duchy of Guelders, which, until 1549, was part of the Habsburg Netherlands within the Holy Roman Empire and is now the Netherlands. His father was a wealthy burgermeister, Jacob Kanis. His mother, Ægidia van Houweningen, died shortly after Peter's birth. He was sent to study at the University of Cologne, where he earned a master's degree in 1540, at the age of 19.

While there, he met Peter Faber, one of the founders of the Society of Jesus. Through him, Canisius became the first Dutchman to join the newly founded Society of Jesus in 1543. Canisius finished his studies in theology and then was ordained in 1546. Through his preaching and writings, Peter Canisius became one of the most influential Catholics of his time. He supervised the founding and maintenance of the first German-speaking Jesuit colleges, often with little resources at hand. At the same time he preached in the city and vicinity, and debated and taught in the university.

Canisius exerted a strong influence on the Emperor Ferdinand I. The king's eldest son (later Maximilian II) appointed Phauser, a married priest, to the office of court preacher. Canisius warned Ferdinand I, verbally and in writing, and opposed Phauser in public disputations. Maximilian was obliged to dismiss Phauser and, on this account, the rest of his life he harboured a grudge against Canisius.

In 1547 he attended several sessions of the Council of Trent. Canisius was an influential teacher and preacher, especially through his "German Catechism", a book which defined the basic principles of Catholicism in the German language and made them more accessible to readers in German-speaking countries. He was offered the post of Bishop of Vienna in 1554, but declined in order to continue his traveling and teachings. He did, however, serve as administrator of the Diocese of Vienna for one year, until a new bishop was appointed for it.

He moved to Germany, where he was one of the main Catholic theologians at the Colloquy of Worms in 1557, and later served as the main preacher in the Cathedral of Augsburg from 1559 to 1568, where he strongly witnessed to his faith on three or four occasions each week. Canisius was renowned as a popular preacher. In 1562 he founded what was to become the University of Innsbruck.

In Christ The King – Lord of History by Anne W. Carroll, it states:

Protestantism had made much headway in Germany because many intellectuals had adopted it, making Catholicism appear to be the religion of the ignorant. By his debates, his writing and his teachings, Peter showed that Catholicism was thoroughly rational, that the Protestant arguments were not convincing.

By his efforts, Peter won Bavaria (southern Germany) and the Rhineland (central Germany) back to the Catholic Church. He also won converts in Austria, Hungary, Bohemia and Poland. Poland had become largely Protestant, but thanks to the efforts of Peter and other Jesuits, it returned to the Church and is still Catholic today despite Communist persecution.

By the time he left Germany, the Society of Jesus in Germany had evolved from a small band of priests into a powerful tool of the Counter-Reformation. Canisius spent the last twenty years of his life in Fribourg, where he founded the Jesuit Collège Saint-Michel, which trained generations of young men for careers and future university studies. During this period, Canisius's work "was translated into almost every language of Europe"; for example, his Summa Doctrinae Christianae (1554) was translated into Scots by Adam King and published in 1588.

In 1591, at the age of 70, Canisius suffered a stroke which left him partially paralyzed, but he continued to preach and write with the aid of a secretary until his death in Fribourg.

He was initially buried at the Church of St. Nicholas. His remains were later transferred to the church of the Jesuit College, which he had founded and where he had spent the last year of his life, and interred in front of the main altar of the church; the room he occupied during those last months is now a chapel open for the veneration of the faithful.

== Pastoral strategy ==
Canisius lived during the height of the Protestant Reformation and dedicated much of his work to the clarification of the Catholic faith in light of the emergence of the new Protestant doctrines. His lasting contribution is his three catechisms, which he published in Latin and German and which became widespread and popular in Catholic regions. In his fight with German Protestantism, he requested much more flexibility from Rome, arguing:

If you treat them right, the Germans will give you everything. Many err in matters of faith, but without arrogance. They err the German way, mostly honest, a bit simple-minded, but very open for everything Lutheran. An honest explanation of the faith would be much more effective than a polemical attack against reformers.

He rejected attacks against John Calvin and Philip Melanchthon: "With words like these, we don't cure patients, we make them incurable."

== Mariology of Canisius ==
Canisius taught that, while there are many roads leading to Jesus Christ, for him the veneration of the Blessed Virgin Mary was the best. His sermons and letters document a clear preoccupation with Marian veneration. Under the heading "prayer" he explains the Hail Mary prayer as the basis for Catholic Marian piety. Less known are his Marian books, in which he published prayers and contemplative texts. To the Hail Mary he added the sentence, Holy Mary, Mother of God, pray for us sinners, which was not at that time commonly recited after the Angelic Salutation. Eleven years later it was included in the Catechism of the Council of Trent of 1566.

Canisius published an applied Mariology for preachers, in which Mary is described in tender and warm words. He actively promoted the sodalities of our Lady and the rosary associations.

Theologically, Canisius defended Catholic Mariology in his 1577 book, De Maria Virgine Incomparabili et Dei Genitrice Sacrosancta Libri Quinque. The book was ordered by Pope Pius V to present a factual presentation of the Catholic Marian teachings in the Bible, the early Christians, the Church Fathers and contemporary theology. Canisius explains and documents Church teachings through the ages regarding the person and character of Mary, her virtues and youth. He traces historical documents about the perpetual virginity of Mary, and her freedom from sin. He explains the dogma of "Mother of God" with numerous quotations from the fathers after the Council of Ephesus. He shows that Church teaching has not changed. He answers the sola scriptura arguments of Protestants by analyzing the biblical basis for Mariology. Book five explains the Catholic view of the assumption as living faith for centuries, supported by most prominent Church writers.

From today's perspective, Canisius clearly erred in some of his sources, but, because of his factual analysis of original sources, it is considered as representing one of the best theological achievements in the 16th century.

== Veneration ==
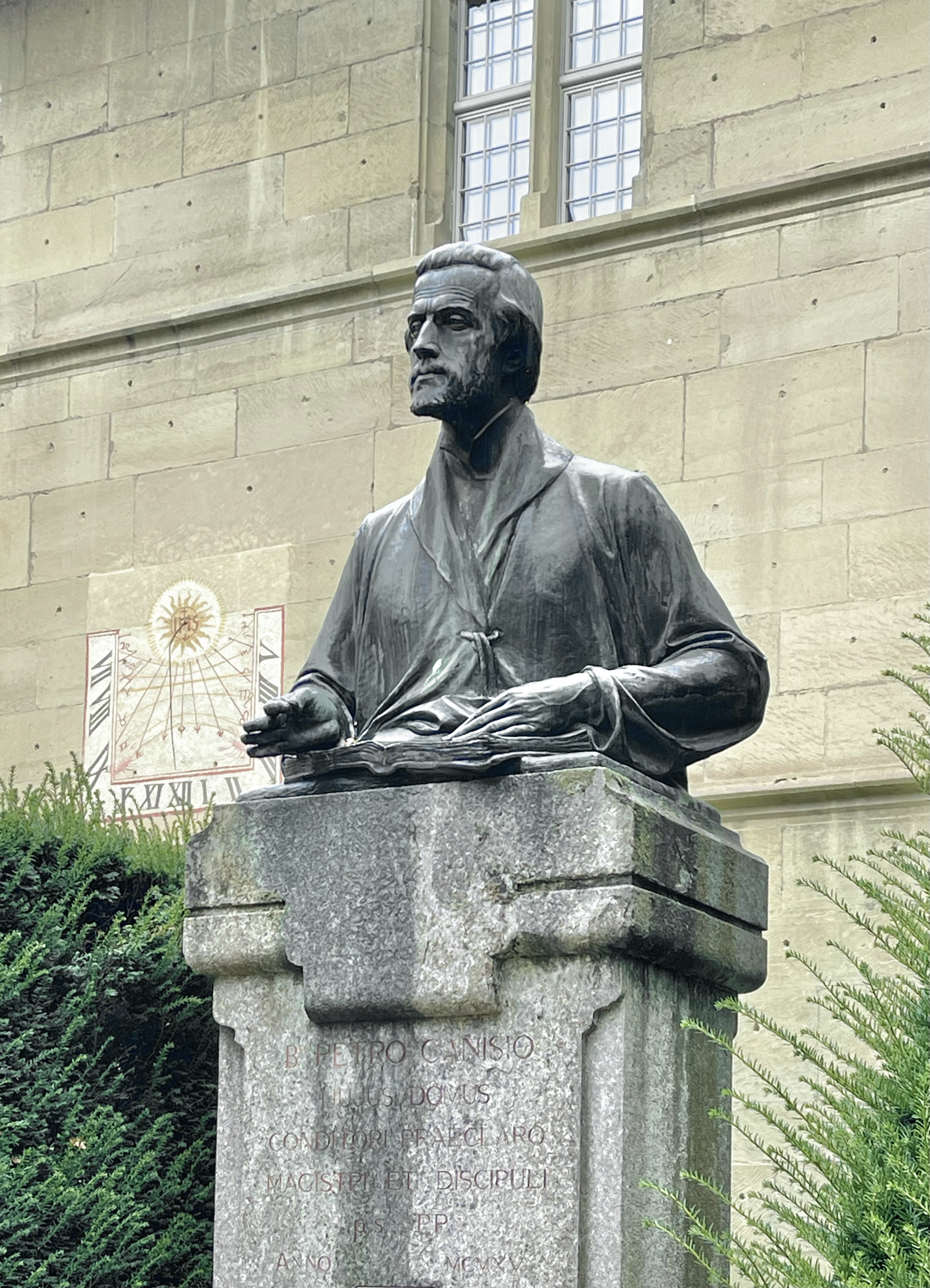
Statue of St Peter Canisius in Fribourg

Canisius was beatified by Pope Pius IX in 1864, and later canonized and declared a Doctor of the Church on 21 May 1925 by Pope Pius XI. His feast day was included in the General Roman Calendar in 1926, for celebration on 27 April. In the liturgical reform of 1969, it was moved to 21 December, the anniversary of his death, the normal day for celebrating a saint's entry into heaven (although it is still kept by the Society of Jesus on 27 April).

== Legacy ==
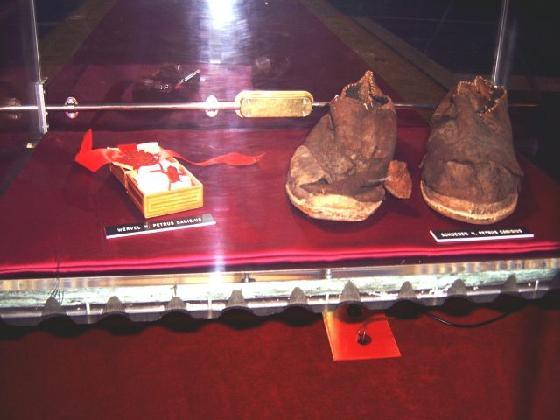
Relics associated with St Peter Canisius

In recognition of Canisius' early work in the establishment of Jesuit education, there are multiple educational institutions named for him. Among them is the Canisius College for seminarians in Vienna, Austria, the first institution named for him, as well as Canisius College, a Jesuit secondary school in his hometown of Nijmegen and the alma mater of Peter Hans Kolvenbach, a recent Superior General of the Society of Jesus. Another Canisius University, a university, and Canisius High School, a secondary school, are located in Buffalo, New York. Furthermore, a Jesuit-run Canisius Kolleg can be found in Berlin, Germany. There are also two secondary schools named after Canisius, Kolese Kanisius (Collegium Canisianum or Canisius College), in Jakarta, Indonesia, and Canisianum Roman Catholic HS in the Omusati Region of Namibia, Africa.

In addition, there is a primary school: Basisschool Petrus Canisius in Puth in Limburg, Netherlands. In 1850 the Canisius Hospital was established on the corner of the Houtmarkt and the Pauwelstraat in Nijmegen. In 1974 it merged with Wilhelmina Hospital located at the Weg door Jonkerbos in Nijmegen, to become Canisius-Wilhelmina Ziekenhuis.

The Apologetisch Vereniging St. Petrus Canisius (St. Peter Canisius Association for Apologetics) was founded in the Netherlands in 1904 to defend the Catholic Church against socialism and liberalism.

Peter Canisius House is located in Pymble on Sydney's North Shore. It specialises in residential individual and group retreats and gatherings for schools, not-for-profit, and private business sectors.

From the middle of the nineteenth century on German churchmen, including Michael Cardinal von Faulhaber (1869–1952), considered Canisius as a new "Apostle of Germany", a successor of Saint Boniface, for his importance for German Christianity.

== Works ==
- (1555) Summa doctrinae christianae (A Summary of Christian Teachings)

The longer version (with quotes from authority):

Vol. 1: Faith, Hope, Charity, the Precepts of the Church
Vol. 2: The Sacraments
Vol. 3: Christian Justification, good works, Cardinal Virtues, Gifts and Fruits of the Holy Ghost, Eight Beatitudes, Evangelical Counsels, etc.

- (1556) Catechismus minor (A Smaller Catechism)
- (1558) Parvus catechismus catholicorum (A Little Catechism for Catholics)
- (1577) De Maria virgine incomparabili (On the Incomparable Virgin Mary)

== See also ==
- Saint Peter Canisius, patron saint archive

== Sources ==
- Petrus Canisius, (Ed. Bourassee) De Maria Virgine Incomparabili et Dei Genitrice Sacrosancta Libri, 1577 Quinque. Paris, 1862.
- Petrus Canisius, (ed. Friedrich Streicher), Meditaciones seunatae in evangelicas lectiones, 1591–1593, (Fribourg, Switzerland, 1939, 1955)

In addition to the listed institutions worldwide, there is Peter Canisius College in Sydney, Australia (suburb of Pymble at 102 Mona Vale Road).
