= Anton Wolfradt =

Austrian abbot and Prince-Bishop

His Grace Anton Wolfradt
- Prince-Bishop of Vienna
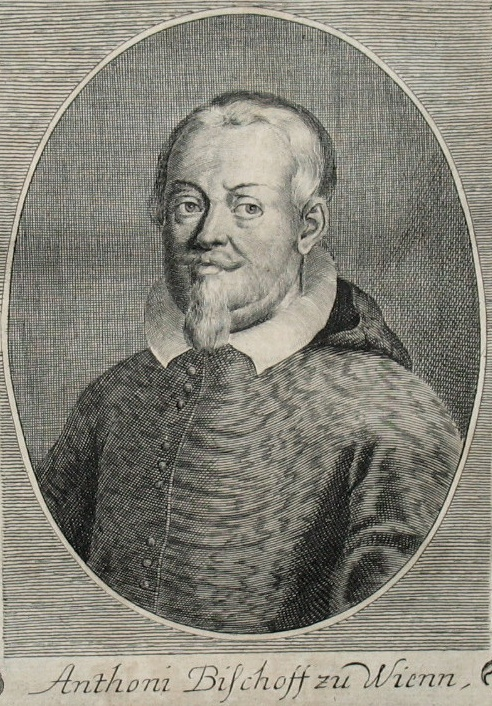
- Engraving, 1631
- Church: Roman Catholic Church
- Diocese: Vienna
- See: St. Stephen's Cathedral
- Installed: 26 May 1631
- Term ended: 1 April 1639
- Predecessor: Melchior Klesl
- Successor: Philipp Friedrich von Breuner

Personal details
- Born: 9 July 1582 Cologne, Electorate of Cologne, Holy Roman Empire
- Died: 1 April 1639 (aged 56) Vienna, Austria, Holy Roman Empire
- Education: Collegium Germanicum (Th.D.)

Anton Franz Wolfradt, O.Cist., O.S.B. (9 July 1582, Cologne – 1 April 1639, Vienna) was a Cistercian and Benedictine, Abbot of Wilhering then Kremsmünster, Prince-Bishop of Vienna, and President of the Hofkammer.

== Biography ==
Anton Wolfradt was the son of a tailor. He first began studying Philosophy at the Collegium Germanicum in Rome in 1599. He entered the Cistercian Order in 1601, and in 1604 made solemn profession at Heiligenkreuz Abbey. He then studied Theology in Rome, graduated with a doctorate in Theology and was ordained a priest on 21 October 1607.

In 1608 he taught at the Rein Abbey near Graz and was consecutively from 1609 the parson of Gratwein. By the recommendation of Cardinal Khlesl he was confirmed on 21 November 1612 to be Abbot of Wilhering in Upper Austria.

Since the monks of the Benedictine Kremsmünster Abbey chose him as their abbot, Pope Paul V allowed a transfer to the Benedictine Order and Wolfradt took to the new office on 15 December 1613. He began with the reform of the monastery and also took on the neighboring abbeys Schlierbach, Gleink and Spital am Pyhrn.

Because of his skills in administrative and financial matters, Emperor Ferdinand II appointed him in 1620 to his council and in October 1623 President of the Court Chamber (German: Hofkammer). Together with the Imperial coin merchant Vinzenz Muschinger, he was commissioned by Emperor Ferdinand to counteract the coinage that had been created in the Kipper und Wipper era. He was also used as a negotiator with the rebellious farmers in Upper Austria and Albrecht von Wallenstein. In 1628, Wolfradt, with Heinrich von Salburg-Falkenstein and Johann Spindler von Hofegg, served as the provisional governing body of Upper Austria, this was forfeited after eight years of negotiations with Bavaria. The office of Hofkammer president, stressful due to the enormous debts of the Emperor, kept Wolfradt until 1630.

In 1630, Cardinal Khlesl proposed him as coadjutor in Vienna. On 15 February 1631, the Emperor appointed him Bishop of Vienna; the Papal confirmation took place on May 26. On the 2nd of August, the Emperor raised him to the rank of Imperial prince, and the following day he was consecrated bishop. Neither Ferdinand II nor Ferdinand III had succeeded in their efforts to obtain the cardinalate for Wolfradt.

In 1633 he belonged, together with Hans Ulrich von Eggenberg and Maximilian von und zu Trauttmansdorff, to those who considered Wallenstein a conspirator and advised Ferdinand II to arrest him.

As a bishop, he sought by religious instruction and preaching to achieve a reconciliation of the Protestants with the Catholic faith. For this he promoted the Jesuit Order both in Vienna and Bohemia.

His motto, "If the Lord does not will it, there is no use," became very popular, a well-known Viennese song made use of this line.

He is buried in the Katharinenkapelle of Vienna's St. Stephen's Cathedral. The self-written epitaph reads: "In my life I was abbot, bishop, prince – now I am dust, shadow, nothing." In 1894 the Wolfrathplatz in Vienna-Hietzing was named after him.

== Bibliography ==
- Hildegard Ernst (1999). "Wolfradt (Wolfrath), Franz Anton von". In Bautz, Traugott (ed.). Biographisch-Bibliographisches Kirchenlexikon (BBKL) (in German). Vol. 15. Herzberg: Bautz. cols. 1545–1548. ISBN 3-88309-077-8.
- Benedict Gsell: Beitrag zur Lebensgeschichte des Anton Wolfradt. In: SMBO, 3, 1882, S. 334–345; 4 (1883), S. 41–48, 255–267.
- Franz Loidl: Geschichte des Erzbistums Wien. Herold, Wien 1983, ISBN 3-7008-0223-4.
- Joseph Maurer, Alexander Hopf: Anton Wolfradt, Fürstbischof von Wien. Wien 1894.
- Günther von Probszt: Österreichische Münz- und Geldgeschichte. Von den Anfängen bis 1918. Band 2., Böhlau, Wien / Leipzig, ISBN 3-205-98181-2, S. 428.
- Leonhard Scherg: Die Germaniker und die Reform des Zisterzienserordens. In: Analecta Cisterciensia, 53, 1997, S. 130–207.
- Ernst Tomek: Kirchengeschichte Österreichs. Tyrolia, Innsbruck, Wien, München, 1935–1959.
