= Ernst von Trautson =

Austrian Prince-Bishop (1633–1702)

His Grace Ernst von Trautson
- Prince-Bishop of Vienna
- Church: Roman Catholic Church
- Diocese: Vienna
- See: St. Stephen's Cathedral
- Installed: 10 September 1685
- Term ended: 7 January 1702
- Predecessor: Emerich Sinelli
- Successor: Franz Anton von Harrach

Personal details
- Born: 26 December 1633 Vienna, Austria, Holy Roman Empire
- Died: 7 January 1702 (aged 68) Vienna, Austria, Holy Roman Empire
- Education: Pontifical Gregorian University

Ernst Graf von Trautson (26 December 1633 – 7 January 1702, Vienna), actually Ernst Trautson von Falkenstein zu Sprechenstein und Schroffenstein, was an Austrian Roman Catholic clergyman who was Prince-Bishop of Vienna from 1685 to 1702.

== Biography ==
Ernst was born the third son of Johann Franz Trautson von Falkenstein (d. 1663), Court Master in Upper Austria, Colonel-Marshal of Tyrol, commander of the Regiment of Lower Austria, Knight of the Order of the Golden Fleece, Lord of St. Pölten, Laa, Dürnkrut, Mistelbach, Raspenbühel and Kaya, and of Countess Maximiliana Walburga of Hohenzollern-Hechingen (d. 1639), daughter of Johann Georg zu Hohenzollern-Hechingen.

Trautson studied Philosophy and Theology at the Pontifical Gregorian University in Rome. On 12 March 1661 he was ordained a deacon in Salzburg, and on 11 June 1661 was elevated to canon of Salzburg and Strasbourg.

Emperor Leopold I appointed him Prince-Bishop of Vienna on 23 March 1685, Papal confirmation taking place on 10 September. He received the episcopal ordination on 28 October 1685 by the apostolic nuncio in Austria, Francesco Buonvisi.

The victories of Prince Eugene of Savoy against the Turks gave Trautson a peaceful term. He continued the reconstruction of churches which had been destroyed in the Turkish siege in 1683, and remodeled St. Stephen's Cathedral by commissioning new altars. He was interested in history and heraldry and had the Trautson manuscript made, in which engraved inscriptions and armorials of the Viennese churches are featured.

In July 1701, Franz Anton von Harrach became coadjutor.

He was buried in the episcopal tomb of St. Stephen's Cathedral in Vienna.

== Bibliography ==
- Franz Hadriga: Die Trautson. Paladine Habsburgs. Styria, Graz u. a. 1996, ISBN 3-222-12337-3, S. 96–108
- Rudolf Leeb u. a.: Geschichte des Christentums in Österreich. Von der Antike bis zur Gegenwart. Uebereuter, Wien 2003, ISBN 3-8000-3914-1
- Franz Loidl: Geschichte des Erzbistums Wien. Herold, Wien 1983, ISBN 3-7008-0223-4
