= Johann Faber =

German catholic theologian (1478–1541)

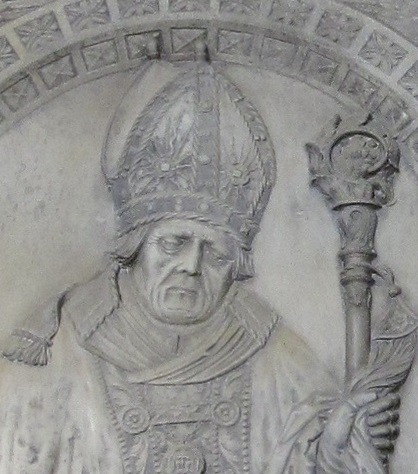
Johann Fabri, portrait from his epitaph in Vienna Cathedral

Johann Faber (1478 – 21 May 1541) was a Catholic theologian known for his writings opposing the Protestant Reformation and the growing Anabaptist movement.

== Biography ==
Johann Faber, the son of a blacksmith, was born in Leutkirch, Swabia and studied theology and canon law at Tübingen and Freiburg in the Breisgau region and was made doctor of sacred theology in Freiburg. He eventually became minister of Lindau, Vicar-General of Constance in 1517, Chaplain and confessor to King Ferdinand I of Austria in 1524, and Bishop of Vienna in 1530.

Like others of his time, Faber was at first friendly with the Reformers, Melanchthon, Zwingli, and Oecolampadius, sympathizing with their efforts at reform and opposing certain abuses himself; but when he realized that neither dogma nor the Church itself was spared by the Reformers, he broke with them and became their most consistent opponent.

While a canon of the cathedral of Basel, Johann Faber formed a friendship with Erasmus that lasted throughout their lives; it was Erasmus who persuaded Faber to take up the study of the Fathers.

Faber wrote his first polemic against Martin Luther, Opus adversus nova quaedam dogmata Martini Lutheri in 1522. This was soon followed by his Malleus Haereticorum, sex libris ad Hadrianum VI summum Pontificem published in Cologne, in 1524, and Rome in 1569.

It is because of this latter work that he is sometimes called the "hammer of heretics". He entered into public debate with Zwingli at Zürich – First Zürich Disputation, January 1523 – and was a prominent figure in all the diets held to restore peace to the Church; as well as being one of the committee appointed to draw up a refutation of the Confession of Augsburg. On some points, such as the celibacy of the clergy, he was willing to recognize certain unfortunate conditions if an agreement could be reached to prevent similar conditions in the future, but no agreement was possible. He was sent by Ferdinand to Spain and then to Henry VIII in England to seek aid against the invading Turks; King Ferdinand also had him enlist the services of the University of Vienna to help combat the spread of the doctrines of Luther in Austria.

As Bishop of Vienna, his zeal was unbounded; he protected his flock by frequent preaching and numerous writings, and he held regular conferences with his clergy. He founded twelve scholarships for boys who wished to become priests but did not have the means to realize their ambition.

He died in Vienna on 21 May 1541.

=== Writer ===
Johann Faber's works (German and Latin) are homiletical and polemical in character. Besides those already mentioned, he wrote treatises on faith and good works, on the Sacrifice of the Mass; an instruction and answer to Luther's work against the King of England; a treatise against the more recent tenets of Luther; a comparison of the writings of Jan Hus and Luther; the power of the pope in the case of Luther; an answer to six articles of Zwingli; defence of Catholic belief against the chief Anabaptist, Balthasar Hubmaier; a book on the religion of the Russians; sermons on the misery of life and on the Blessed Sacrament; as well as sermons of consolation and courage whilst the Turks were besieging Vienna. His works in three folio volumes (Cologne, 1537–40) do not contain his polemical writings; these are found in "Opuscula quaedam Joannis Fabri, Episcopi Viennensis published in Leipzig, 1537.

== Works ==
- Constantiensis in spiritualibus vicarii opus adversus nova quaedam et a Christiana religione prorsus aliena dogmata Martini Lutheri, Rome 1522, Leipzig 1523, Köln 1524 as Malleus in haeresim Lutheranam link
- Ad Serenissimum Principem Ferdinandum Archiducem Austriae, Moscovitarum iuxta mare glaciale religio. Basileae 1526.
- Opera. 3 vol. Köln 1537–41
