= Santa Maria degli Angeli e dei Martiri =

Catholic basilica in Rome

Basilica of St. Mary of the Angels and the Martyrs
- Santa Maria degli Angeli e dei Martiri (Italian); Beatissimae Virginis et Omnium Angelorum et Martyrum (Latin)
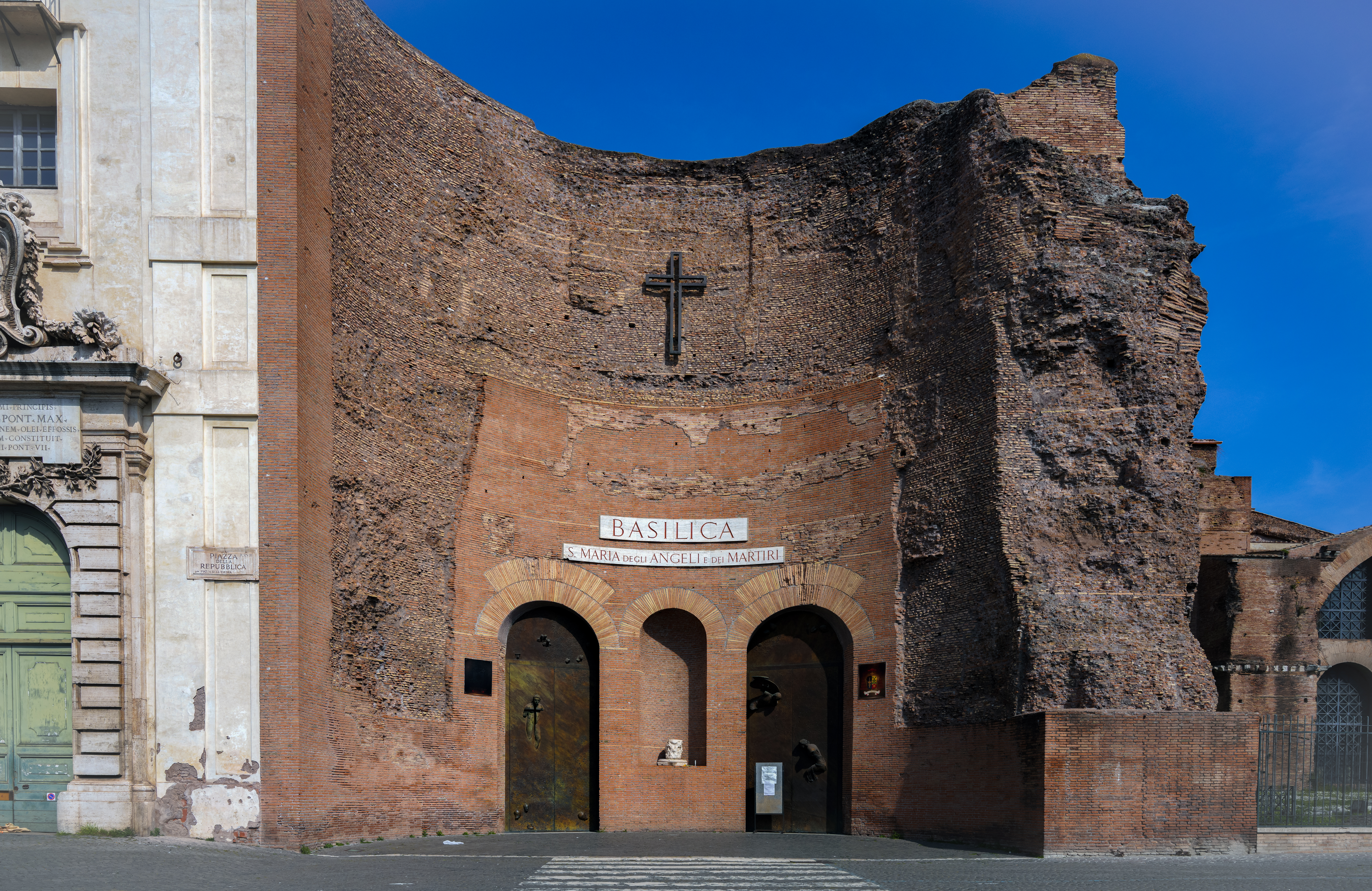
- The church facade is an apse in the wall of the caldarium of the Baths of Diocletian.
- Click on the map for a fullscreen view
- 41°54′11″N 12°29′49″E
- Location: Piazza della Repubblica, Rome
- Country: Italy
- Denomination: Catholic
- Sui iuris church: Latin Church
- Religious order: Carthusian (until 1870)
- Website: Official website

History
- Status: Minor basilica, titular church
- Dedication: Mary, mother of Jesus, Christian martyrs

Architecture
- Architects: Michelangelo Buonarroti; Luigi Vanvitelli
- Groundbreaking: 1562

Specifications
- Length: 128 metres (420 ft)
- Width: 105 metres (344 ft)

The Basilica of St. Mary of the Angels and of the Martyrs (Latin: Beatissimae Virginis et omnium Angelorum et Martyrum, Italian: Santa Maria degli Angeli e dei Martiri) is a Catholic titular minor basilica and former Carthusian conventual church in Rome constructed in the ruined frigidarium and tepidarium of the Roman Baths of Diocletian in the Piazza della Repubblica.

It was constructed in the 16th century following an original design by Michelangelo Buonarroti. Other architects and artists added to the church over the following centuries. During the Kingdom of Italy, the church was used for religious state functions.

== Background ==
The original building of the Santa Maria degli Angeli e dei Martiri was a bath house commissioned by Emperor Maximian in 297 AD and was completed in 306 AD. It is believed that Christian slaves constructed the baths using the finest materials from all over the Roman empire. Monoliths of granite from Egypt, wood from the Bavarian forests held up the vaulted ceilings and arches, and intricate mosaics decorated the walls. The baths were in use until the fall of Rome in 537 which the Aqua Marcia was destroyed, the aqueduct supplying the baths' water. The baths soon decayed into ruins as they were mined for their expensive materials which were repurposed for other buildings.

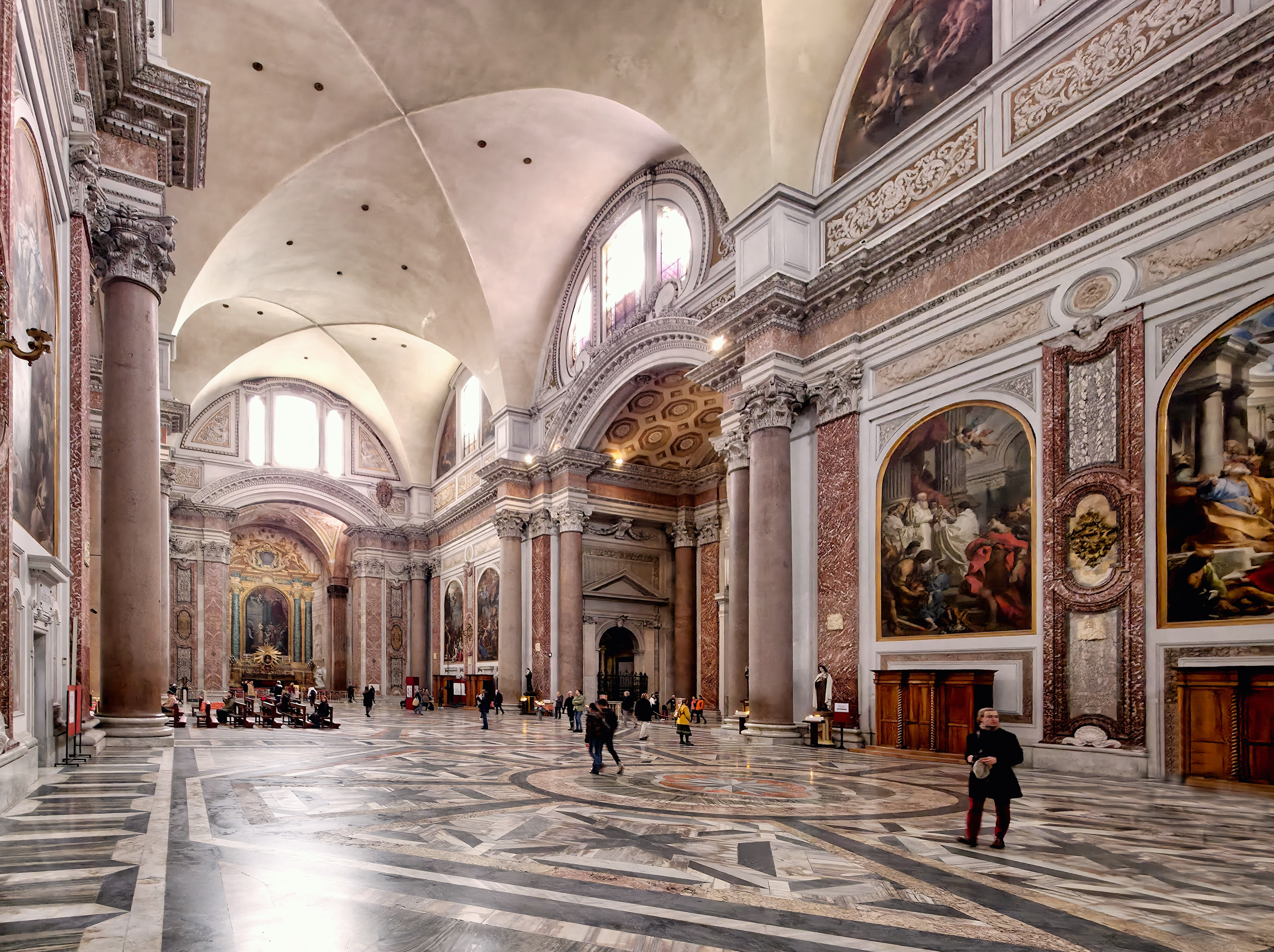
The transept, with Roman columns, vaults and thermal bath windows

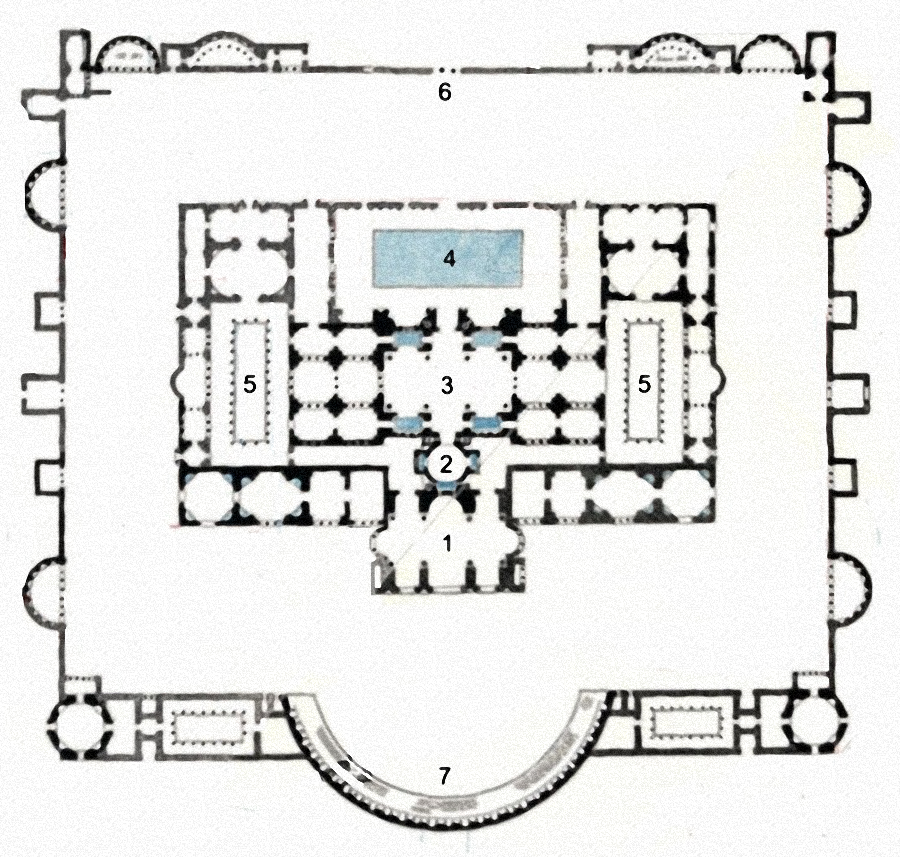
Reconstructed floorplan of the Diocletian Baths: (1) Caldarium, (2) Tepidarium, (3) Frigidarium, (4) Natatio, (5) Palaestra, (6) main entrance, (7) Exedra. The Church is built in surviving structures of 2 and 3.

== Description ==
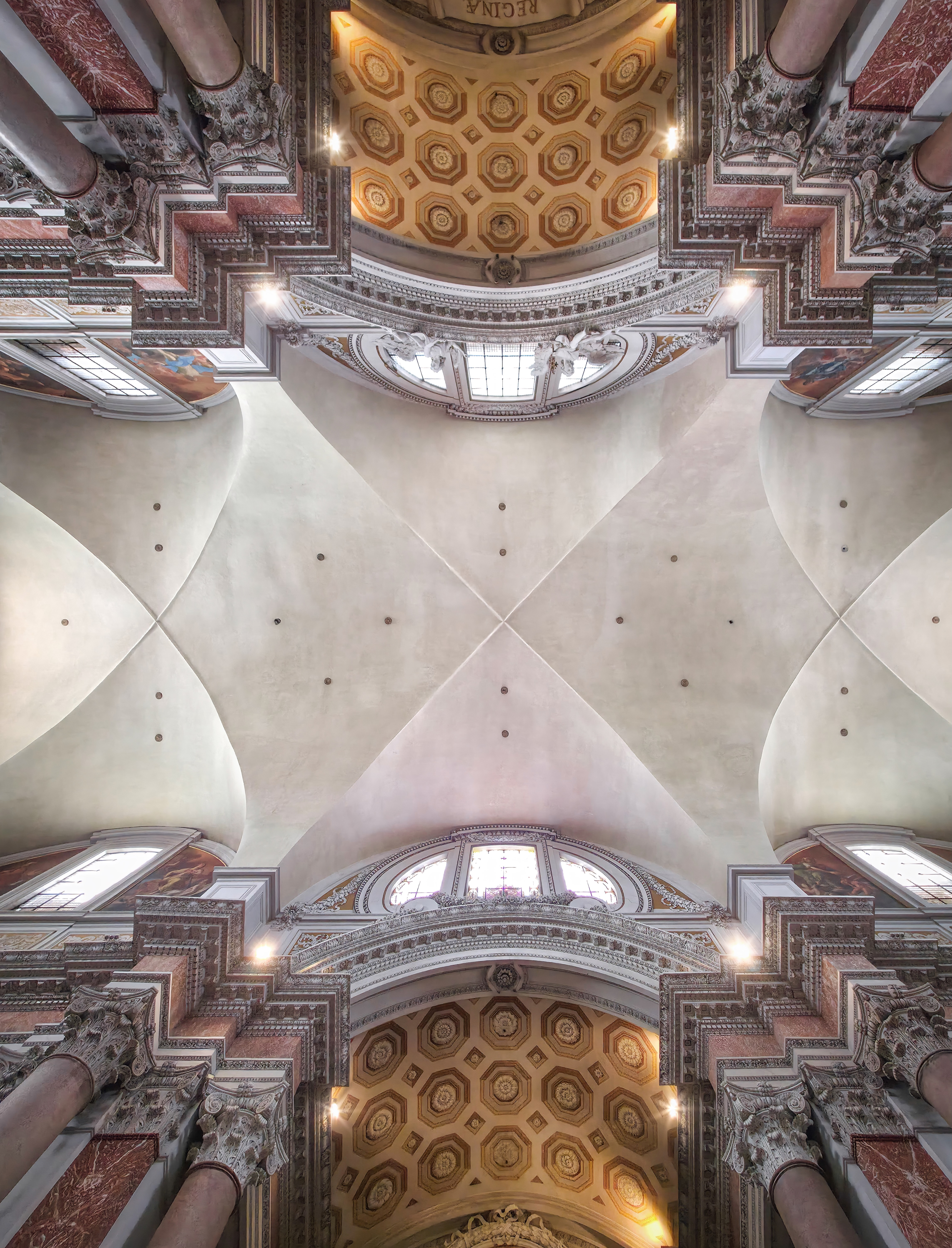
Vault ceiling

The basilica is dedicated to the Christian martyrs, known and unknown. By a brief dated 27 July 1561, Pius IV ordered the church "built", to be dedicated to the Beatissimae Virgini et omnium Angelorum et Martyrum ("the Most Blessed Virgin of all the Angels and Martyrs"). Campaign managers to accomplish this were St. Philip Neri and St. Charles Borromeo. Impetus for this dedication had been generated by the account of a purported mystical vision experienced in 1541 at Santa Maria di Loreto, Rome of the ruins of the Baths by a Sicilian monk, Antonio del Duca, who had been lobbying for decades for papal authorization of a more formal veneration of the Angels. It was also a personal monument of Pope Pius IV, whose tomb is in the apsidal tribune.

The thermae of Diocletian dominated the Viminal Hill with their ruined mass. Michelangelo Buonarroti worked from 1563 to 1564 to adapt a section of the remaining structure of the baths to enclose a church. Upon Michelangelo's death in 1564, the work was carried on by his pupil, Jacopo Del Duca. Some later construction was directed by Luigi Vanvitelli in 1749. In 1911, the Vanvitellian façade on Piazza Esedra was demolished to restore the suggestive niche of the calidarium with Roman bricks. This intervention, however, made the church less visible, and often mistaken for a ruin.

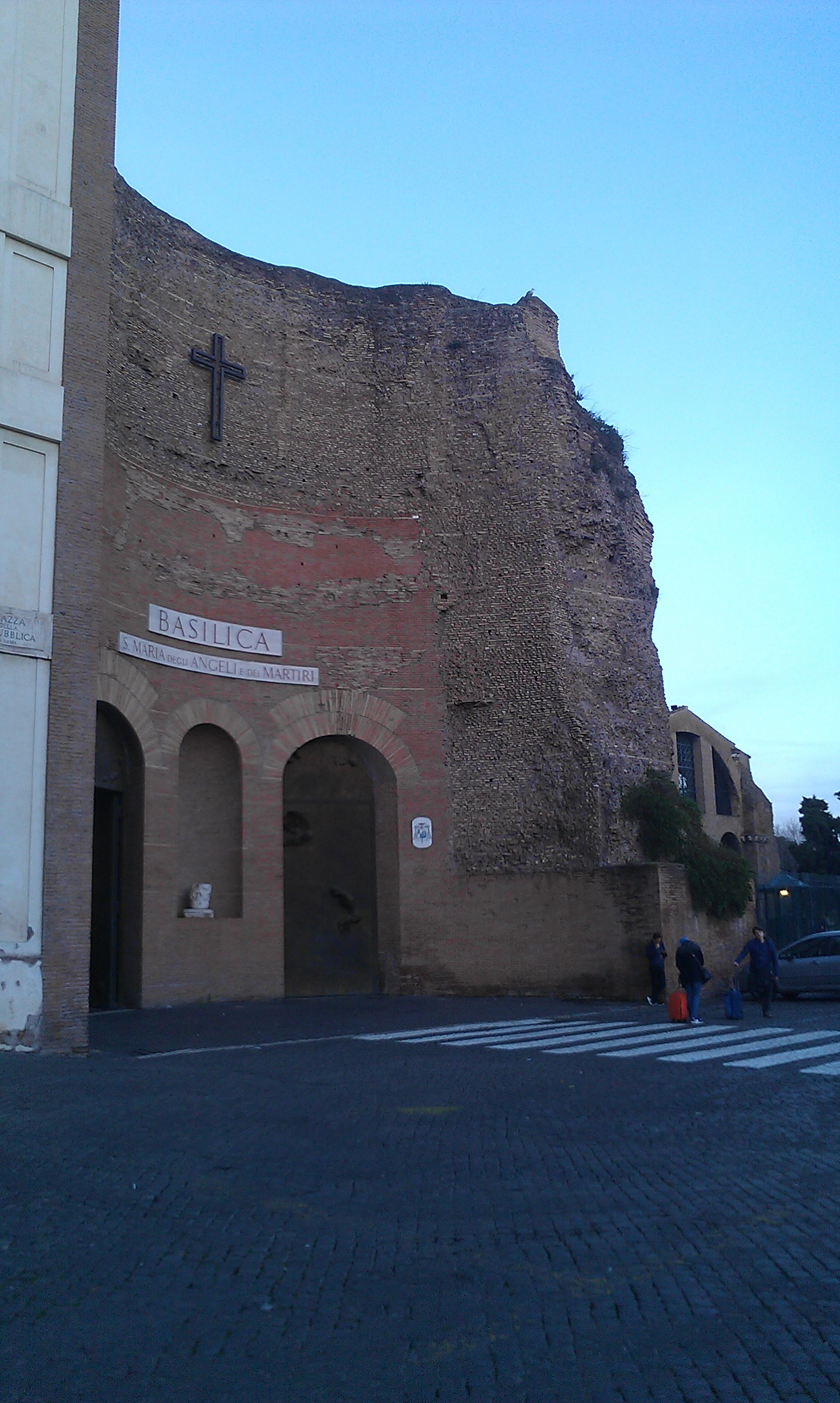
Entrance to the basilica

At Santa Maria degli Angeli, Michelangelo achieved a sequence of shaped architectural spaces, developed from a Greek cross, with a dominant transept, with cubical chapels at each end, and the effect of a transverse nave. There is no true facade; the simple entrance, with its unique concave brick shape, is one of the ancient exedras of the calidarium of the thermae.

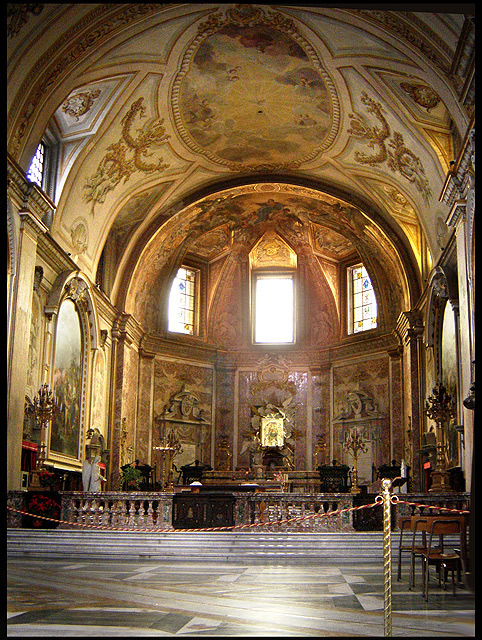
The raised space of the tribune.

The great vaulted transept emphasized the scale of the Roman constructions, 90.8 meters long, and with the floor that Michelangelo raised to bring it up to the 16th century street level, 28 meters high. Raising the floor truncated the red granite Roman columns that articulate the transept and its flanking spaces. Michelangelo made the transept 27 meters wide, thus providing vast cubical spaces at each end of the transept.

The vestibule with canted corners and identical side chapels—one chapel has the tomb of Salvator Rosa, the other of Carlo Maratta—leads to a second vestibule, repeated on the far side of the transept, dominated by the over lifesize Saint Bruno of Cologne by Jean Antoine Houdon (1766). Of the Saint Bruno, Pope Clement XIV said that he would speak, were it not for the vow of silence of the order he founded. The Carthusian monks held both the Church and the monastery from 1581 to 1873. The monastery is now a museum.

The Chapel of San Bruno houses the organ of Formentelli from the Millenium Jubilee. Made by the organ builder Bartolomeo Formentelli from Verona, it was a gift to Pope John Paul II from the city of Rome.

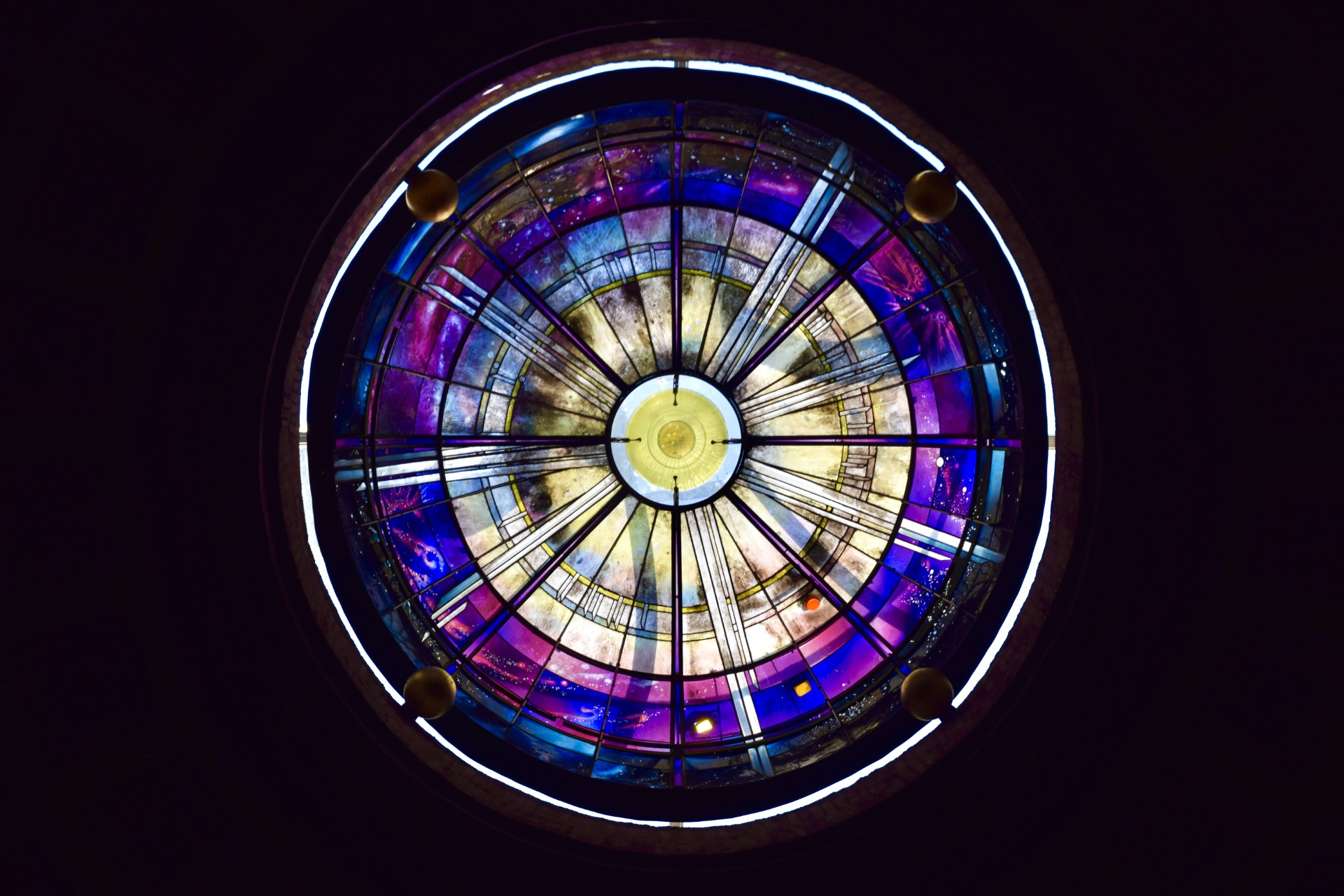
Light and Time by Narcissus Quagliata.

The stained glass dome in the ceiling of the first vestibule is by Italian-American artist Narcissus Quagliata. Installed in 2001, the dome spans five meters in diameter and is located some 23 meters above the floor. Titled Light and Time, its abstract design functions as a sundial - by observing its reflection on the floor of the round vestibule, one can follow the movement of the sun across the sky.

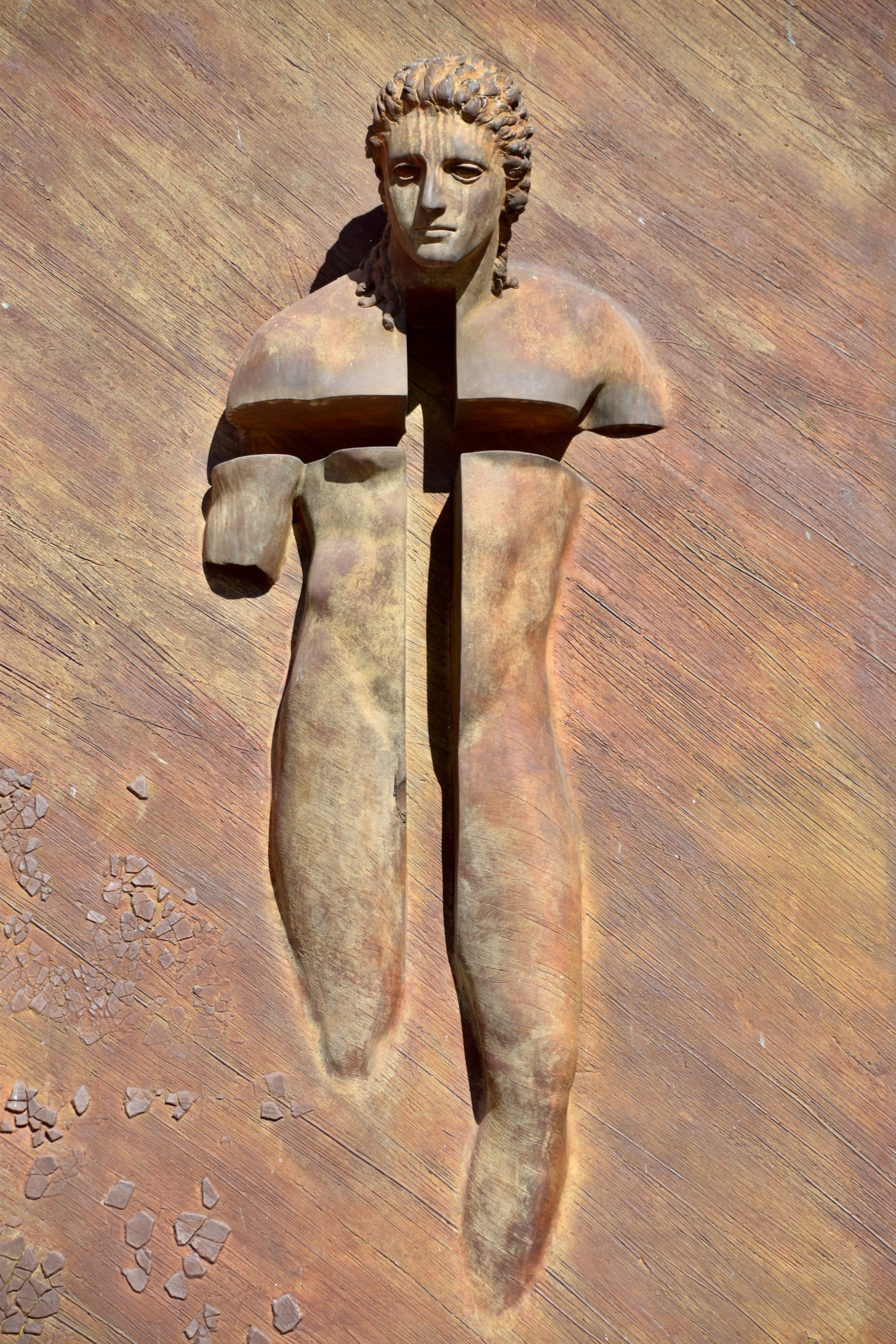
Detail of bronze doors by Igor Mitoraj.

In 2006, Polish-born sculptor Igor Mitoraj created new bronze doors as well as a statue of John the Baptist for the basilica. In April 2010, a three-metre-high (9.8-foot) bronze statue of Galileo Galilei Divine Man (designed by 1957 Nobel laureate Tsung-Dao Lee) was unveiled in a courtyard within the complex. The statue (a dedication to the 17th-century scientist and philosopher) was a donation from CCAST (China Center of Advanced Science and Technology) and WFS (World Federation of Scientists).

Santa Maria degli Angeli was the official state church of the Kingdom of Italy (1870–1946). More recently, national burials have been held in the church. The church hosts the tombs of General Armando Diaz and Admiral Paolo Thaon di Revel, who were successful commanders during World War I on the Italian front. Also today the Basilica is used for many ceremonies, including the funeral of soldiers killed abroad.

=== The meridian line ===
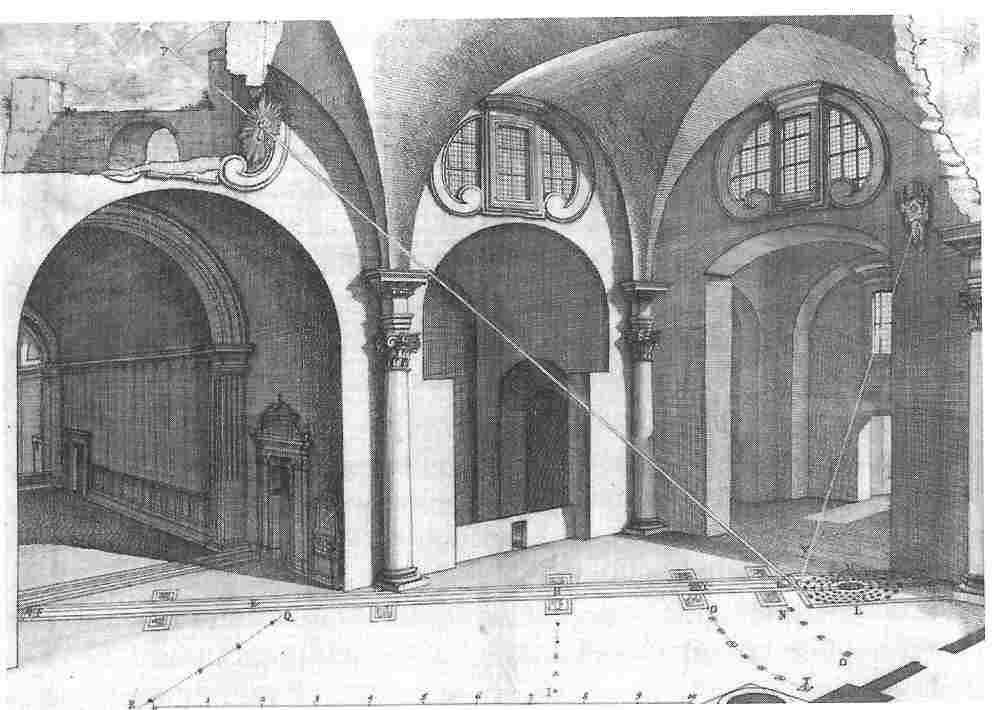
Diagram of Bianchini's meridian, from his De Calendario (1703): the ray on the right comes from the sun, and hits the line at solar noon through the year; the ray on the left is from Polaris

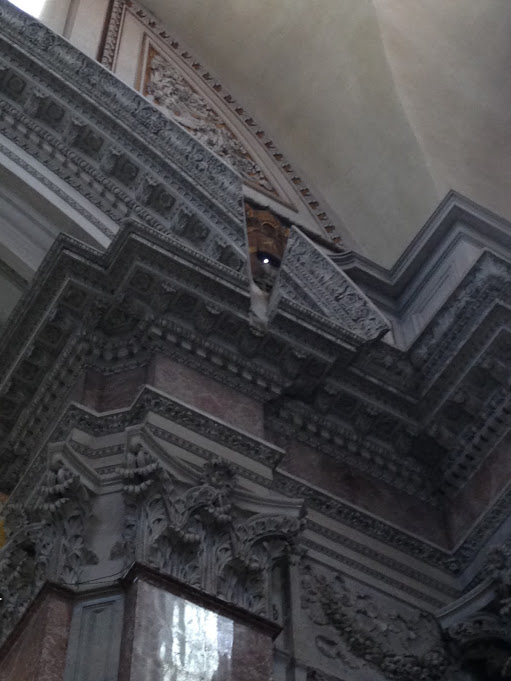
The hole in the church's wall, or oculus, from which the sun can shine through and onto the meridian line

At the beginning of the 18th century, Pope Clement XI commissioned the astronomer, mathematician, archaeologist, historian and philosopher Francesco Bianchini to build a meridian line, a sort of sundial, within the basilica. Completed in 1702, the object had a threefold purpose: the pope wanted to check the accuracy of the Gregorian reformation of the calendar, to produce a tool to predict Easter exactly, and, not least, to give Rome a meridian line as important as the one Giovanni Domenico Cassini had recently built in Bologna's basilica of San Petronio, San Petronio. Alan Cook remarked, "The disposition, the stability and the precision are much better than those of the famous meridian... in Bologna".

This church was chosen for several reasons: (1) Like other baths in Rome, the building was already naturally southerly oriented, so as to receive unobstructed exposure to the sun; (2) the height of the walls allowed for a long line to measure the sun's progress through the year more precisely; (3) the ancient walls had long since stopped settling into the ground, ensuring that carefully calibrated observational instruments set in them would not move out of place; and (4) because it was set in the former baths of Diocletian, it would symbolically represent a victory of the Christian calendar over the earlier pagan calendar.

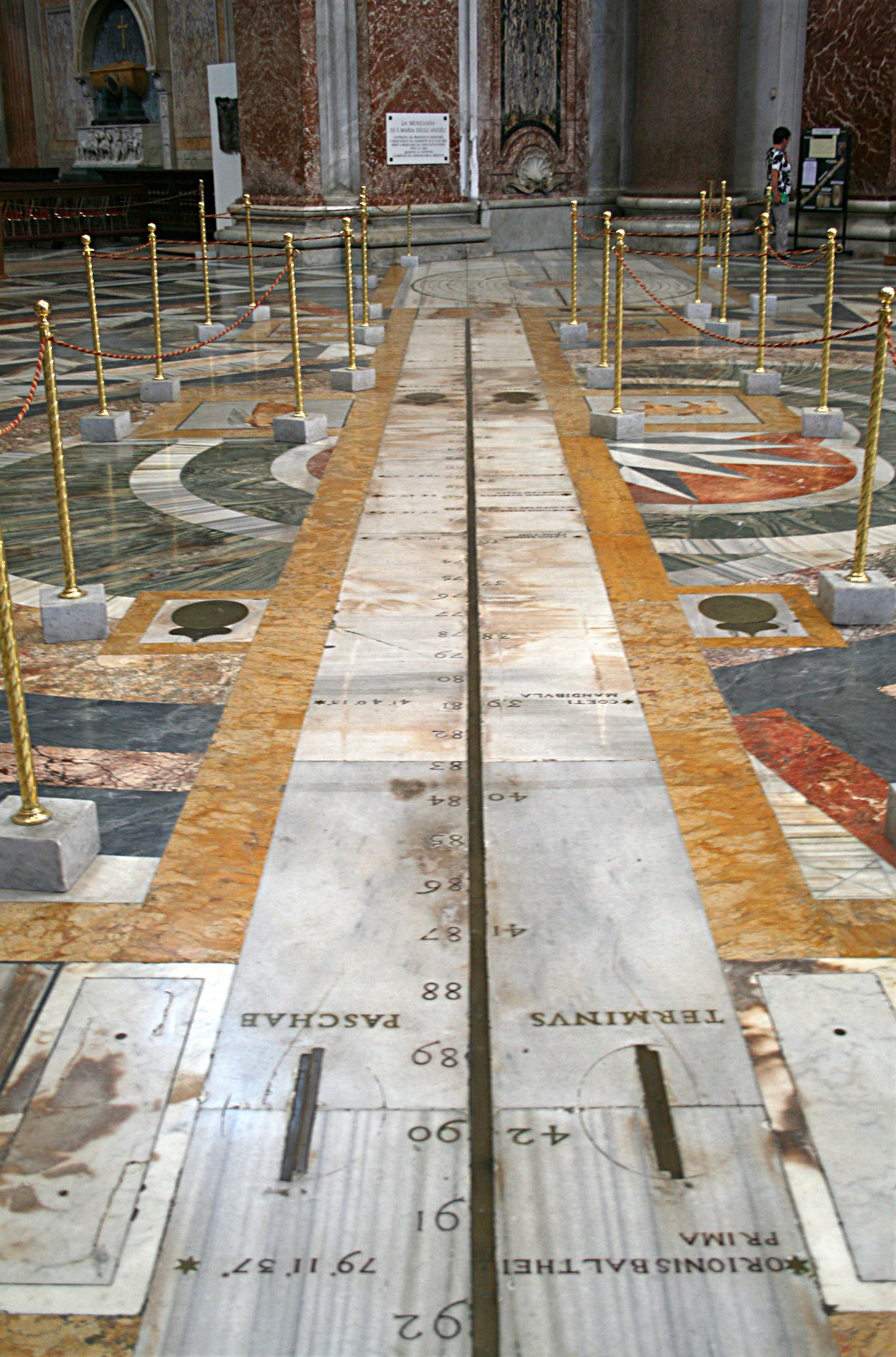
The meridian solar line made by Francesco Bianchini

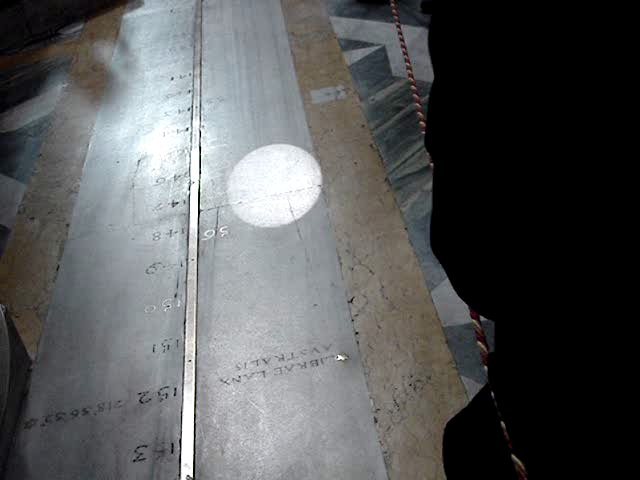
Bianchini's gnomon projects the sun's image onto his line just before solar noon, around 11:54 in late October

Bianchini's sundial was built along the meridian that crosses Rome, at longitude 12° 30' E. At solar noon, which varies according to the equation of time from around 10:54 a.m. UTC in late October to 11.24 a.m. UTC in February (11:54 to 12:24 CET), the sun shines through a small hole in the wall to cast its light on this line each day. At the summer solstice, the sun appears highest, and its ray hits the meridian line at the point closest to the wall. At the winter solstice, the ray crosses the line at the point furthest from the wall. At either equinox, the sun touches the line between these two extremes. The longer the meridian line, the more accurately the observer can calculate the length of the year. The meridian line built here is 45 meters long and is composed of bronze, enclosed in yellow-white marble.

In addition to using the line to measure the sun's meridian crossing, Bianchini also used the window behind the pope's coat of arms and a movable telescope to observe the passage of several stars such as Arcturus and Sirius to determine their right ascensions and declinations. The meridian line was restored in 2002 for the tricentenary of its construction, and it is still operational today.

== Cardinal Protectors since 1687 ==
The Church of S. Maria degli Angeli was designated a titular church for a cardinal priest on 15 May 1565 by Pope Pius IV. Since 1687, the following prelates have served as cardinal protector of Santa Maria degli Angeli e dei Martiri:

- Sigismondo Pappacoda (December 1527 – November 1536)
- Giovanni Antonio Serbelloni (15 May 1565 – 12 April 1570)
- Prospero Santacroce (12 April 1570 – 5 May 1575
- Giovanni Francesco Commendone (5 July 1574 – 9 January 1584)
- Mark Sittich von Hohenems (3 October 1577 – 3 October 1578)
- Simeone Tagliavia d'Aragona (20 May 1585 – 9 December 1592)
- Federico Borromeo (25 October 1593 – 21 September 1631)
- Ernst Adalbert von Harrach (7 June 1632 – 18 July 1667
- Marzio Ginetti (17 October 1644 – 19 February 1646)
- Niccolo Albergati-Ludovisi (25 June 1646 – 11 October 1666)
- Antonio Bichi (14 November 1667 – 3 March 1687)
- Raimondo Capizucchi, O.P. (3 March 1687 — 22 April 1691)
- Étienne Le Camus (8 August 1691 — 12 September 1707)
- Giuseppe Vallemani (28 November 1707 — 15 December 1725)
- Melchior de Polignac (19 December 1725 — 20 November 1741)
- Camillo Cybo (20 December 1741 — 12 January 1743)
- Giovanni Battista Spínola (23 September 1743 — 15 November 1751)
- Girolamo de Bardi (28 May 1753 — 11 March 1761)
- Filippo Acciaioli (6 April 1761 — 24 July 1766)
- Giovanni Ottavio Bufalini (6 August 1766 — 3 August 1782)
- Guglielmo Pallotta (23 September 1782 — 21 September 1795)
- Ignazio Busca (18 December 1795 — 12 August 1803)
- Filippo Casoni (26 March 1804 — 9 October 1811)
- Giuseppe Morozzo Della Rocca (8 March 1816 — 22 March 1842)
- Mario Mattei (22 July 1842 — 17 June 1844)
- Domenico Carafa della Spina di Traetto (22 July 1844 – 12 May 1879)
- Lajos Haynald (12 May 1879 – 4 July 1891)
- Anton Joseph Gruscha (1 June 1891 – 15 August 1911)
- Gennaro Granito Pignatelli di Belmonte (27 November 1911 – 6 December 1915)
- Alfonso Mistrangelo, Sch. P. (6 December 1915 – 7 November 1930)
- Jean-Marie-Rodrigue Villeneuve, O.M.I. (13 March 1933 – 17 January 1947)
- Paul-Émile Léger, PSS (12 January 1953 – 13 November 1991)
- William Henry Keeler (26 November 1994 – 23 March 2017)
- Anders Arborelius OCD (28 June 2017 – present)

== Burials ==
- William Chisholm (II)
- Salvator Rosa (d. 1673)
- General Armando Diaz
- Admiral Paolo Thaon di Revel

== Sources ==
- Bernardi Salvetti, C. S. Maria degli Angeli alle Terme e Antonio Lo Duca (Paris: Desclée, 1965).
- Matthiae, Guglielmo, S. Maria degli Angeli (Roma: Marietti, 1965).
- Ackerman, James S., The Architecture of Michelangelo 2nd. ed. 1964:136-41.
- De Angelis, P., Chiesa di Santa Maria degli Angeli alle Terme diocleziane (Roma: Coop. tip. Manuzio, 1920).
- Soprintendenza per i beni ambientali e architettonici del Lazio (edd.), Santa Maria degli Angeli e dei Martiri: incontro di storie (Roma: La Meridiana editori, 1991).
- Serlorenzi, Mirella, and Stefania Laurenti, Terme di Diocleziano, Santa Maria degli Angeli (Roma: EDUP, 2002).
- Karmon, David, "Michelangelo's "Minimalism" in the Design of Santa Maria degli Angeli", in Annali di Architettura n° 20, Vicenza 2008 on-line text
- Touring Club Italiano (TCI) Roma e Dintorni 1965:317f.
- Plevoets, B., & Van, C. K. (2019). Adaptive reuse of the built heritage : Concepts and cases of an emerging discipline. Taylor & Francis Group.

Preceded by San Marco Evangelista al Campidoglio, Rome	Landmarks of Rome; Santa Maria degli Angeli e dei Martiri	Succeeded by Santa Maria dei Miracoli and Santa Maria in Montesanto
