= Cölestin Josef Ganglbauer =

His Eminence Cölestin Josef Ganglbauer O.S.B.
- Cardinal; Archbishop of Vienna
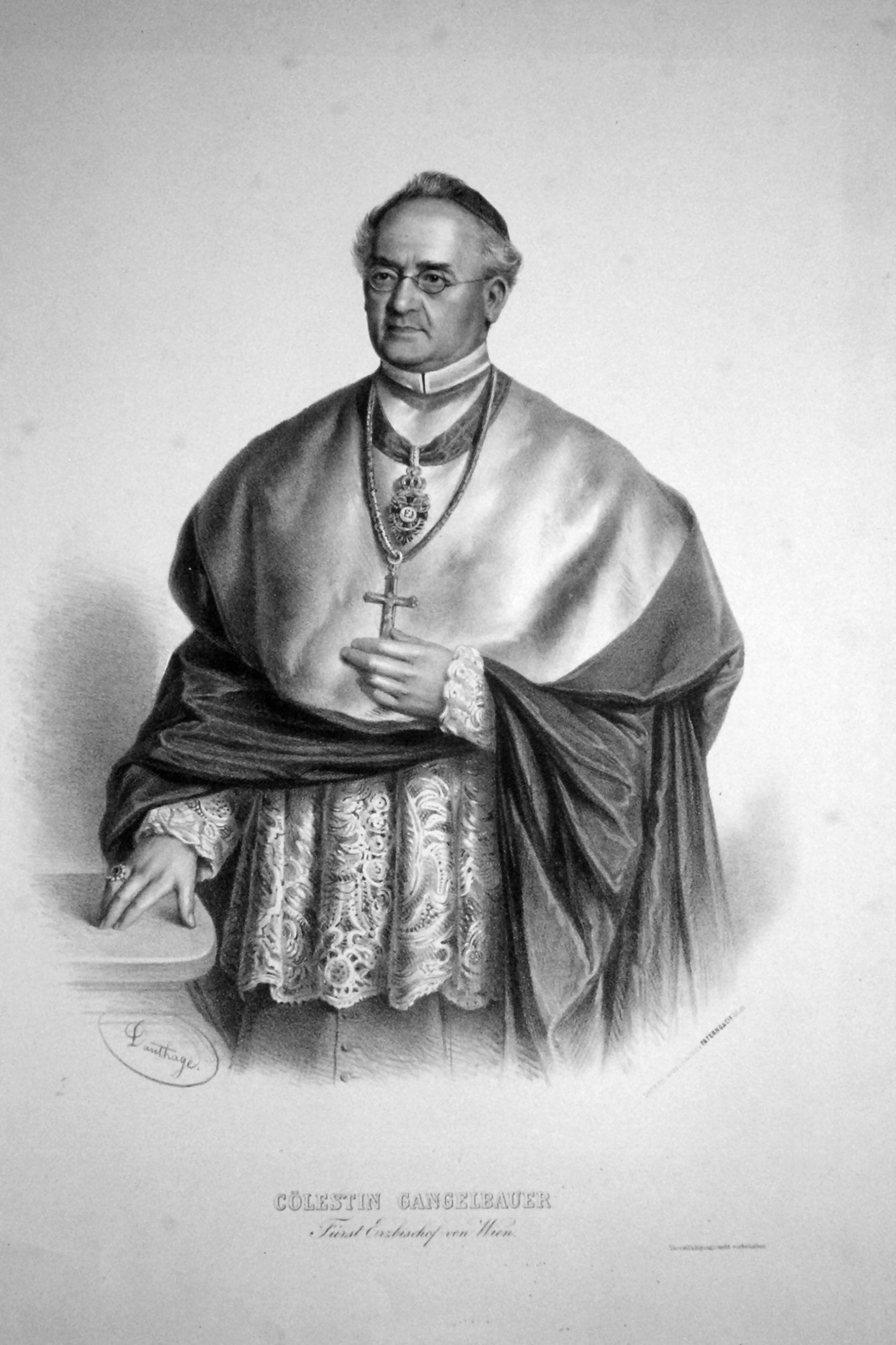
- Church: Roman Catholic Church
- Archdiocese: Vienna
- See: Vienna
- Appointed: 4 August 1881
- Term ended: 14 December 1889
- Predecessor: Johann Rudolf Kutschker
- Successor: Anton Josef Gruscha
- Other post: Cardinal-Priest of Sant'Eusebio (1886-89)

Orders
- Ordination: 22 July 1843
- Consecration: 28 August 1881 by Serafino Vannutelli
- Created cardinal: 10 November 1884 by Pope Leo XIII
- Rank: Cardinal-Priest

Personal details
- Born: Josef Ganglbauer; 20 August 1817 Schiedlberg, Austrian Empire
- Died: 14 December 1889 (aged 72) Vienna, Austria-Hungary
- Buried: Saint Stephen's Cathedral
- Parents: Johann Ganglbauer; Katharina Weinberger
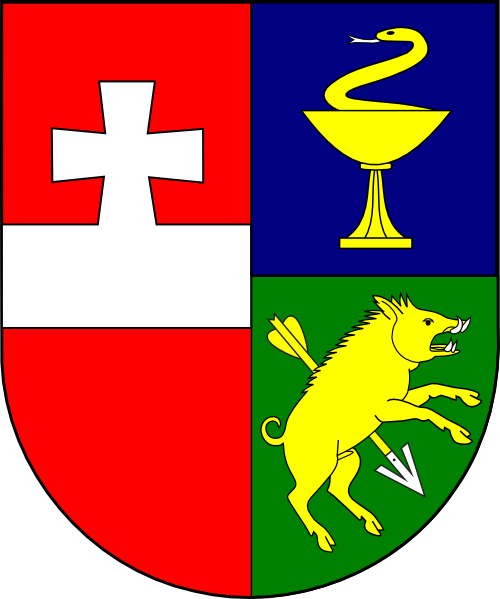
- Coat of arms

Cölestin Josef Ganglbauer, O.S.B. (20 August 1817 in Thanstetten – 14 December 1889 in Vienna) was a Cardinal of the Roman Catholic Church and Archbishop of Vienna.

== Early life and education ==
Josef Ganglbauer was born in Schiedlberg, Austria. He entered the Order of Saint Benedict, taking the name Cölestin. He had his religious profession on 25 August 1842. Studied theology in Linz from 1839 until 1843, receiving minor orders on 26 August 1842 and the diaconate on 15 July 1843.

== Priesthood ==
He was ordained priest on 22 July 1843, working in the parish of Neuhofen until 1846. Then he started academic career. He was elected Prior of the monastery of Kremsmünster in 1875 and was elected its abbot on 19 April 1876.

== Episcopate and cardinalate ==
Ganglbauer was appointed Archbishop of Vienna on 4 August 1881. Pope Leo XIII created him cardinal priest in the consistory of 10 November 1884 with the title of Sant'Eusebio.

== Death ==
He died on 14 December 1889, at 1:25 p.m. in the archiepiscopal palace in Vienna. The remains were laid to rest in the metropolitan cathedral.

Preceded by Johann Rudolf Kutschker	Archbishop of Vienna; 4 August 1881 – 14 December 1889	Succeeded by Anton Josef Gruscha
