= Johann Rudolf Kutschker =

Austrian archbishop and cardinal (1810–1881)

His Eminence Johann Baptist Rudolph Kutschker
- Cardinal, Archbishop of Vienna
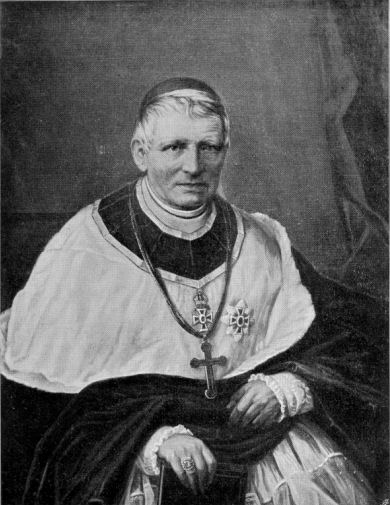
- See: Archdiocese of Vienna
- Installed: 15 April 1876 — 27 January 1881
- Predecessor: Joseph Othmar Rauscher
- Successor: Cölestin Ganglbauer, O.S.B.
- Other post: Cardinal priest of Sant'Eusebio
- Previous posts: Titular bishop of Carrhae auxiliary bishop of Vienna

Orders
- Created cardinal: 22 June 1877

Personal details
- Born: 11 April 1810 Loučky, Austrian Silesia
- Died: 27 January 1881 (aged 70) Vienna, Austria-Hungary
- Buried: St. Stephen's Cathedral, Vienna
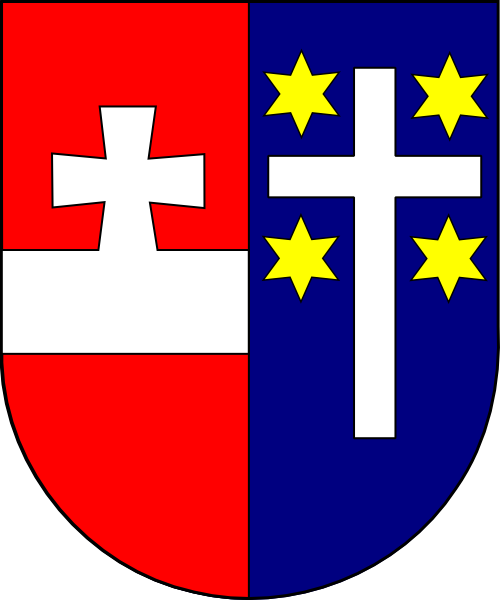
- Coat of arms

Johann Baptist Rudolph Kutschker (11 April 1810, Loučky – 27 January 1881, Vienna) was an Austrian cardinal of the Catholic church.

== Life ==
Johann Rudolf Kutschker was born in Seifersdorf, Austrian Silesia (now Loučky in Zátor, Czech Republic). He studied humanities and philosophy at the Olomouc University then at the University of Vienna - doctorate in theology.

Ordained priest on 21 April 1833 and incardinated in the archdiocese of Olomouc, he became professor of moral theology of the local university for seventeen years. Later he was appointed to different higher posts in the period 1857–1876 in Vienna.

Kutschker was elected titular bishop of Carrhae and appointed auxiliary bishop of archdiocese of Vienna on 7 April 1862. Promoted to the metropolitan see of Vienna on 15 April 1876.

Archbishop Kutschker was created cardinal priest in the consistory of 22 June 1877 by Pope Pius IX and assigned to the title of Sant'Eusebio. He participated in the Papal conclave, 1878.

He died in Vienna on 27 January 1881 and was buried in the metropolitan St. Stephen's Cathedral, Vienna.
