= Julian Romance =

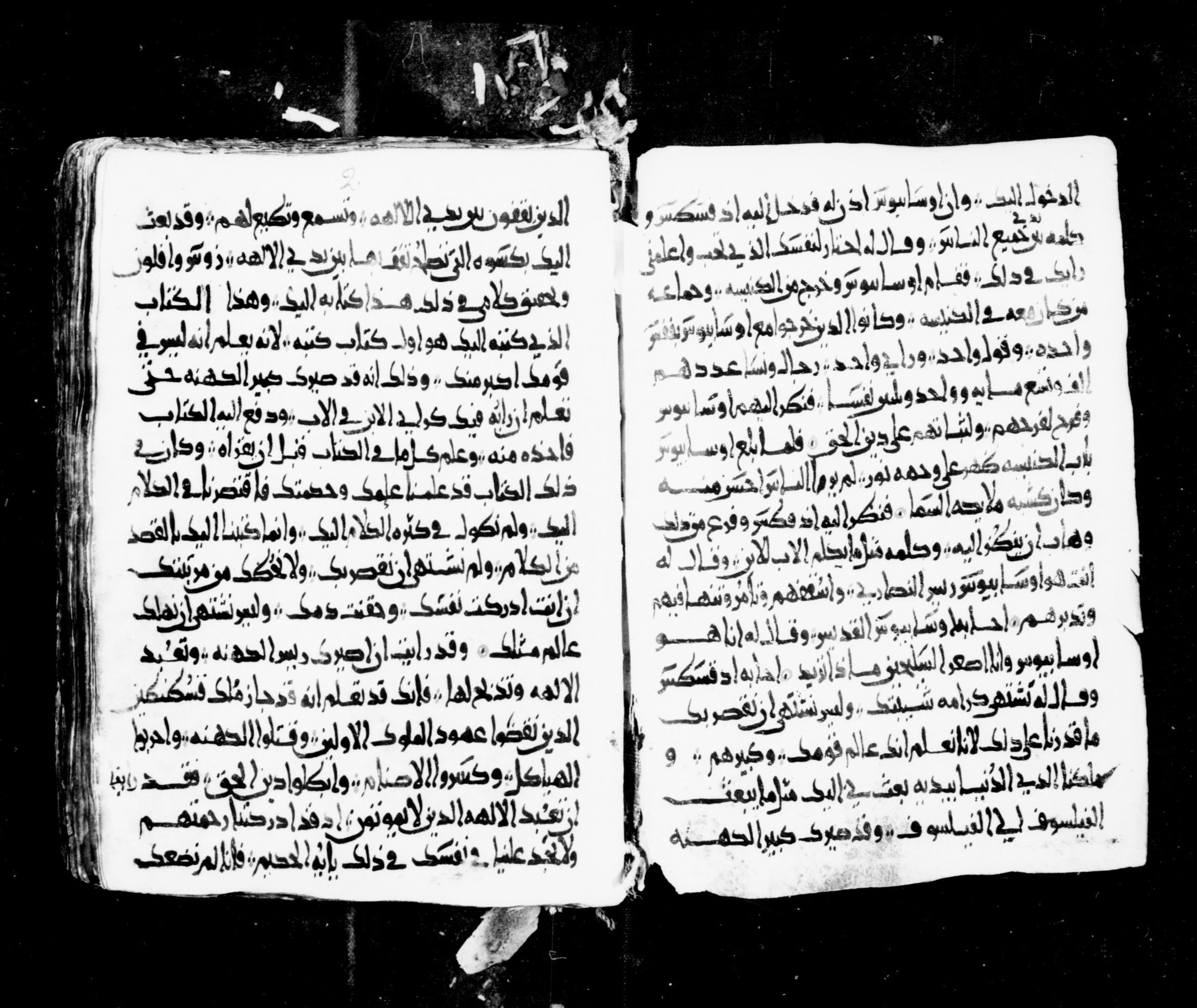
Two pages from the Arabic version of the Julian Romance

The Julian Romance is fictionalized prose account of the reign of the Roman emperor Julian the Apostate and one of the major narrative works of Syriac literature. It was written sometime between Julian's death in 363 and the copying of the oldest known manuscript in the sixth century. It was probably written in Edessa in Syriac, the language of all surviving copies. An Arabic adaptation had been made by the tenth century.

The Romance is written from a Christian perspective. It is divided into three parts. The first describes the accession of Julian and his persecution of Christians. The second describes Julian's conflict with Eusebius of Rome. The third and longest part, written in the form of a letter, describes Julian's Persian expedition, his downfall and the accession of the Christian emperor Jovian.

There exists a short Syriac text known as the "second Romance".

== Date, place and language ==
There is no scholarly consensus on the original language or the date and place of composition of the Julian Romance. It was probably composed in Syriac, although Michel van Esbroeck argued that it was translated from Greek. It is great importance in Syriac linguistics, being cited 1,117 times by Carl Brockelmann in his Lexicon syriacum (1928).

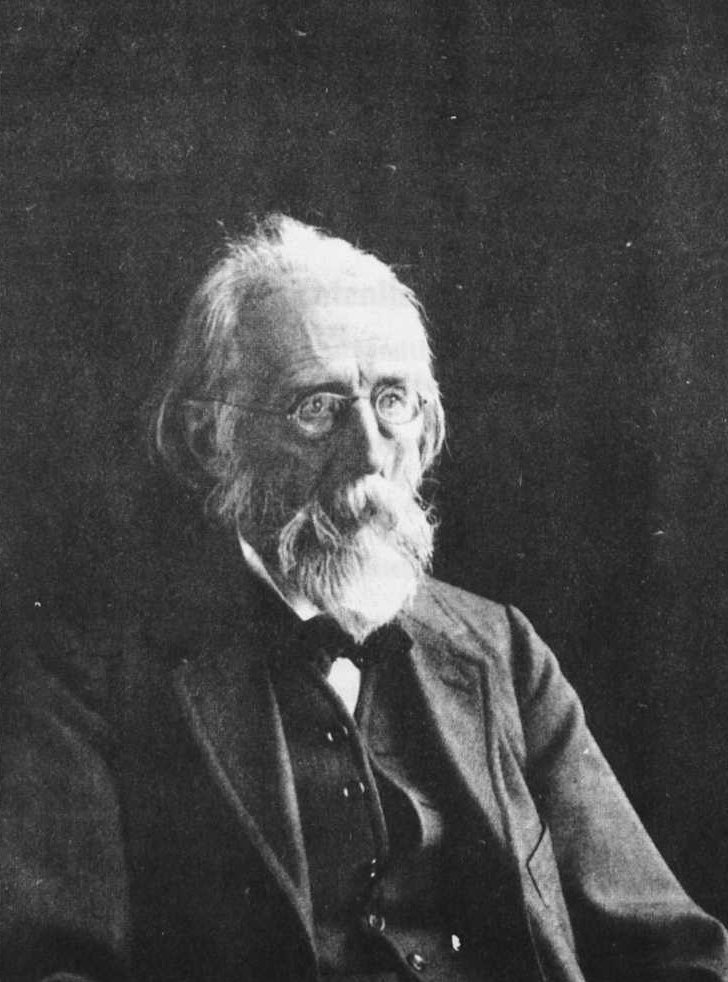
Theodor Nöldeke, who first classified the work as a romance

It was written between the death of Julian the Apostate (363) and the date of the oldest surviving manuscript (sixth century), but there is no consensus on a more precise dating. H. J. W. Drijvers proposed that it was originally written in Syriac in Edessa shortly after the death of Shapur II in 379. Sebastian Brock favours a fifth-century date. Theodor Nöldeke argued that it was the work of a single author writing in Syriac in Edessa between 502 and 532, although van Esbroeck thought it was only translated into Syriac around that time. Philip Wood also argues for a date in the sixth century.

The Romance was influenced by the works of Ephrem the Syrian (died 373) and is similar in style to those of Jacob of Serugh (died 521). Nöldeke was the first to identify its genre as that of romance.

== Manuscripts, editions and translations ==
The text of the Julian Romance is known primarily from a single Syriac manuscript, now in London, British Library, MS Add. 14641. It is written in Esṭrangela script. The manuscript was copied in the sixth century, but sustained damage and had 23 folios replaced before the end of the twelfth century. It was found in the Monastery of the Syrians in Egypt and brought to the British Library in the 1830s. The first 12 folios are lost, but what they contained can be partially reconstructed from the only other witness to the Syriac text: the lower writing of a palimpsest, now in Paris, Bibliothèque nationale, MS Syr. 378. This was identified by Sebastian Brock in 1975. The Syriac text of the British Library manuscript was first published by J. G. E. Hoffmann in 1880. The "Eusebius story" alone was published by Paul Bedjan (1896) and Richard James Horatio Gottheil (1906).

An abridged translation into Arabic is preserved in the tenth-century manuscript Arabic 516 of Saint Catherine's Monastery and in a two-page fragment in the Mingana Collection. The first English translation was by Hermann Gollancz (1928), followed by an abridged French translation by Jean Richer (1978). The Syriac text of the palimpsest was first published in 2000 with an English translation. Gorgias Press has published a revised English translation by Michael Sokoloff (2017), which includes material from the palimpsest.

There is a text known as the "second Julian Romance", the relationship of which to the first Romance is unclear. The second Romance is known from a single seventh- or eighth-century manuscript: British Library, MS Richmond 7192. This Syriac text was also published by Hoffmann (1880), translated into German by Nöldeke (1874), translated into English by Gollancz (1928) and translated and abridge in French by Richer (1978). The second text focuses on "Julian's apostasy, sorcery and veneration of idols and demons." Nöldeke concluded that it was written in the later sixth century by a different author than that of the first.

== Synopsis ==
=== Structure ===
The Julian Romance is divided into three parts. The first part is a narrative of the Constantinian dynasty from the death of Constantine the Great (337) until the accession of Julian the Apostate (361) and the ensuing Julianic persecution of Christians. The second part is a narrative of the opposition of Eusebius of Rome to the persecution. The third part, which is the longest, takes the narrative into the reign of Jovian (363–364). It is in the form of a letter by a certain Aploris to one Abdil. It is sometimes called the "History of Jovian".

The overarching narrative of the Romance is of Julian's persecution of Christians and his invasion of Persia. This is punctuated by stories of persons who stood up to him (the longest of which is that of Eusebius) and the interventions of the righteous Jovian (called Jovinian in the text). Not all of those who resisted Julian escaped martyrdom. Their stories are sometimes drawn from non-Edessene traditions, leading them to author's contradict the narrative at points. For example, the cities of Rome and Edessa are portrayed as great Christian cities, while Antioch and Constantinople are condemned. Yet some of the interspersed narratives are clearly drawn from Antiochene and Constantinopolitan traditions that do not share this view.

=== Eusebius story ===
The first part of the work is introductory and establishes the madness and tyranny of Julian and the virtue of Eusebius. The story picks up when Julian's ally, Adoctus, urges Eusebius to become a pagan priest to help the new emperor undo the Christianization of the Roman Empire. Adoctus claims that Rome's successes stem from its adherence to the old religion. Eusebius refuses to go along and is joined by Volusianus, a leading Roman citizen, who then publicly reveals his conversion to Christianity. He advises Julian that he cannot be truly emperor until he is acclaimed in Rome.

Out of revenge for the destruction of their synagogues, the Jews team up with Julian and the pagans to repeat the Diocletianic persecution. New pagan altars are built, but the monks of Rome, aided by some monks from Mesopotamia, attack Julian's men in the street, killing many. The captured are then burned on the altars they had built. The Christian elite of Rome, following the example of Volusianus, resign from political power.

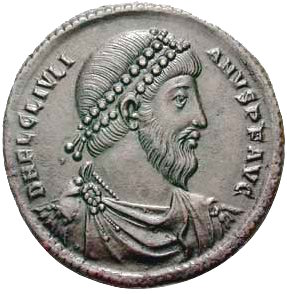
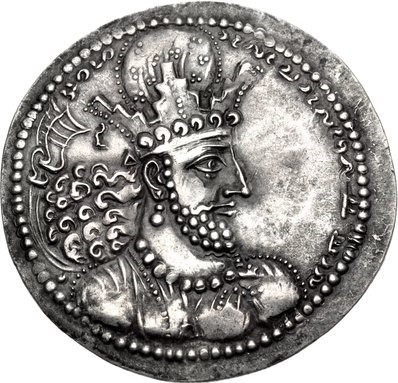
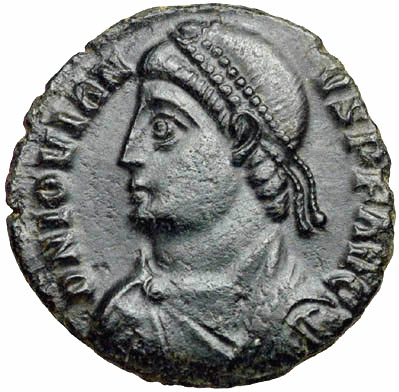
From top to bottom: Julian, Shapur and Jovian. The conflicts of these three form the frame narrative of the Romance.

In Julian's encampment, the philosopher Aplatus reminds the emperor that he must yet be acclaimed in Rome. When Julian goes to Rome, however, the citizens refuse to acclaim him until he promises religious toleration. He arrests the leading citizens to execute them. Eusebius is thrown into a fire, which does not consume him but does kill the pagan priests standing nearby. When an executioner tries to finish him off with an axe, an angel strikes him down. The citizens repudiate Julian, saying, "you will not be a king over us, for our city does not need a stranger to king over it, for its king is alive and has risen and will never be destroyed."

=== Letter of Aploris ===
The epistolary section that closes out the work is addressed by Jovian's chamberlain, Aploris, to an abbot named Abdil. Aploris recounts how Jovian pretended to serve Julian while secretly working to protect Christians. After his failure at Rome, Julian bribes Constantinople into persecuting Christians. A certain Maximus, mocking paganism for its reliance on Homer, tries to convince the city not to side with Julian. While Julian is watching female dancers at a pagan festival, Maximus attempts to assassinate him. He fails in both efforts, although he does knock the crown off of Julian's head. Julian is acclaimed "king of the Romans" in Constantinople.

The larger part of the letter is framed by an account of Julian's war with Persia. First, he declares war on Shapur II of Persia because of the latter's tolerance of Christians. Shapur's lieutenant, Arimhar, meets with Jovian in Syria and give him information on Persian troop dispositions. They agree to begin the war immediately.

Meanwhile, Julian has taken his campaign of persecution to the Roman East. The Jews of Tiberias convert to paganism, claiming that Solomon was a pagan and hoping to convince Julian to rebuild the temple in Jerusalem. In Antioch, the inhabitants forsake Christianity, welcome Julian and join the pagans and Jews in plundering the churches. A Jew of Edessa named Humnas denounces his city to the emperor, who sends envoys to demand its surrender. The Edessenes refuse to let them in and cloak their walls in black out of mourning. They direct the emissaries to the pagan city of Harran.

Some Jews from Edessa go the emperor and request Jerusalem as compensation for their seized properties in Edessa. A group of Christian soldiers defects from Julian and takes refuge in Edessa. When the Jews try to return, the soldiers massacre them. Julian vows to destroy the city. Jovian and the local bishop, Valgash, lead the city of Nisibis in prayers for Edessa, after which Julian decides to spare it until after his war with Persia. Julian then visits Harran, where he destroys the churches and participates in the worship of the moon god Sin. As he bows to Sin, the crown falls from his head. As he is leaving the city, his horse stops and refuses to go before dropping dead.

Julian is killed in battle by an arrow. Jovian publicly declares his Christianity and is acclaimed emperor. Arimhar converts to Christianity and the two sides make peace. Nisibis and the Sinjar Mountains are handed over to Persia for a hundred years because they belong to the land of the Aramoye. Shapur promises toleration of Christians and the restoration of trade.

At his coronation, Jovian has the crown placed on a cross, kneels before the cross and lets the crown fall onto his head. He visits Edessa, where he is given a crown "made with care in the days of king Abgar". He heals a sick woman and then returns to Constantinople. The narrative ends abruptly at this point.

== Influence ==
The Julian Romance influenced the later Syriac apocalyptic tradition, notably the Apocalypse of Pseudo-Methodius, and also the Arabic historiographic tradition, notably the History of the Prophets and Kings of al-Ṭabarī. Its influence can also be seen in Greek and Georgian literature.

== Bibliography ==
- Ben-Horin, U. (1961). "An Unknown Old Arabic Translation of the Syriac Romance of Julian the Apostate". Studia Hierosolymitana. 9: 1–10.
- Brock, S. P.; Muraviev, Alexei (2001). "The Fragments of the Syriac Julian Romance from the Manuscript Paris Syr 378". Khristianskij Vostok. 2: 14–34.
- Butts, Aaron M. (2011). "Julian Romance". In Sebastian P. Brock; Aaron M. Butts; George A. Kiraz; Lucas Van Rompay (eds.). Gorgias Encyclopedic Dictionary of the Syriac Heritage: Electronic Edition. Gorgias Press.
- Drijvers, Jan Willem (1999). "The Syriac Julian Romance: Aspects of the Jewish–Christian Controversy in Late Antiquity". In H. L. J. Vanstiphout (ed.). All Those Nations... Cultural Encounters Within and With the Near East. Styx Publications. pp. 31–42.
- Drijvers, Jan Willem (2011). "Religious Conflict in the Syriac Julian Romance". In Peter Brown; Rita Lizzi Testa (eds.). Pagans and Christians in the Roman Empire: The Breaking of a Dialogue (IVth–VIth Century A.D.). LIT Verlag. pp. 131–162.
- Mazzola, Marianna; Van Nuffelen, Peter (2023). "The Julian Romance: A Full Text and a New Date". Journal of Late Antiquity. 16 (2): 324–373.
- Muraviev, Alexei (1999). "The Syriac Julian Romance and Its Place in Literary History". Khristianskij Vostok. 1: 194–206.
- Sokoloff, Michael, ed. (2017). The Julian Romance: A New English Translation. Gorgias Press.
- Wood, Philip (2010). 'We Have No King But Christ': Christian Political Thought in Greater Syria on the Eve of the Arab Conquest (c.400–585). Oxford University Press.
