= Zátor =

- Municipality
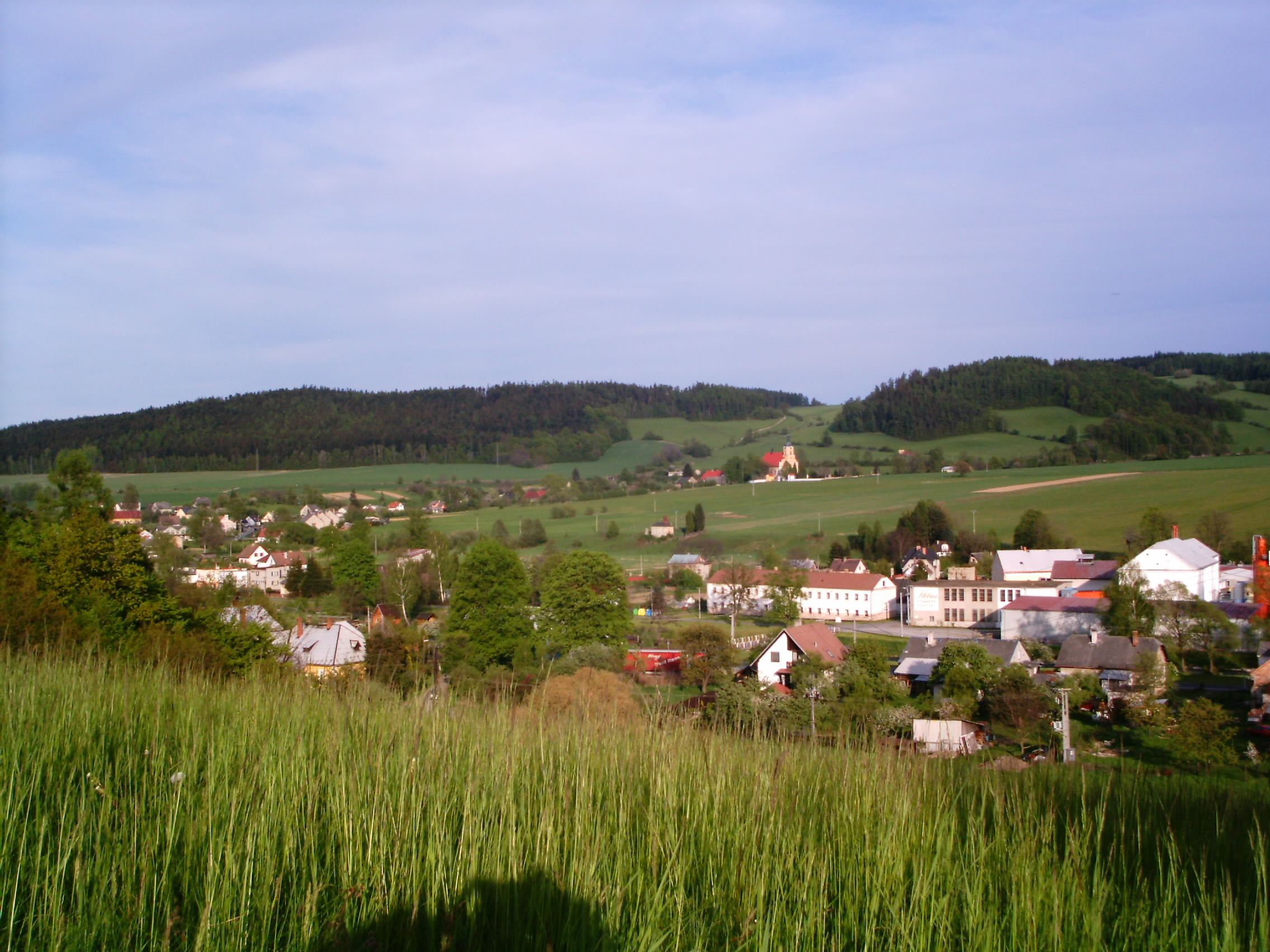
- Panorama of Zátor

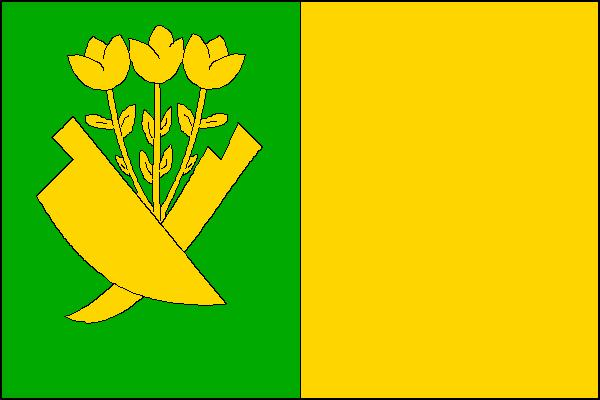
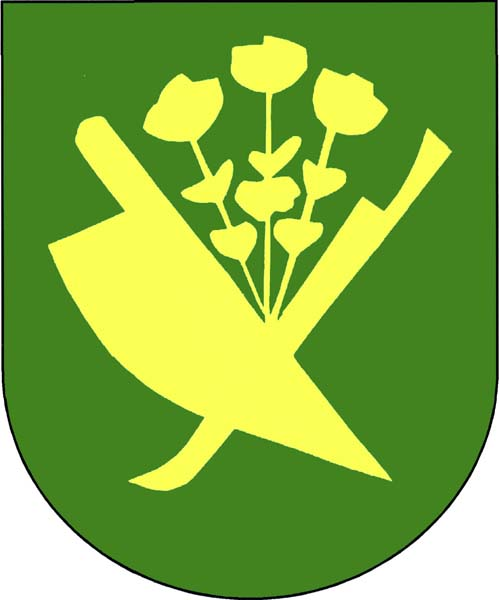
- Flag Coat of arms

- Location in the Czech Republic
- Coordinates: 50°2′3″N 17°35′35″E
- Country: Czech Republic
- Region: Moravian-Silesian
- District: Bruntál
- First mentioned: 1377

Area
  - Total: 19.07 km^{2} (7.36 sq mi)
- Elevation: 368 m (1,207 ft)

Population (2026-01-01)
  - Total: 1,141
  - Density: 59.83/km^{2} (155.0/sq mi)
- Time zone: UTC+1 (CET)
  - Summer (DST): UTC+2 (CEST)
- Postal code: 793 16
- Website: www.zator.cz

Zátor (German: Seifersdorf) is a municipality and village in Bruntál District in the Moravian-Silesian Region of the Czech Republic. It has about 1,100 inhabitants.

== Administrative division ==
Zátor consists of two municipal parts (in brackets population according to the 2021 census):

- Zátor (528)
- Loučky (568)

== Geography ==
Zátor is located about 10 kilometres (6 mi) northeast of Bruntál and 52 km (32 mi) northwest of Ostrava, in the historical region of Czech Silesia. It lies in the Nízký Jeseník range. The highest point is a nameless hill at 620 m (2,030 ft) above sea level. The Opava River flows through the municipality.

== History ==
The first written mention of Zátor is from 1377.

== Demographics ==
Historical population

Year	Pop.	±%
1869	1,459	—
1880	1,520	+4.2%
1890	1,567	+3.1%
1900	1,434	−8.5%
1910	1,534	+7.0%

Year	Pop.	±%
1921	1,564	+2.0%
1930	1,610	+2.9%
1950	1,113	−30.9%
1961	1,179	+5.9%
1970	1,014	−14.0%

Year	Pop.	±%
1980	1,126	+11.0%
1991	1,119	−0.6%
2001	1,183	+5.7%
2011	1,143	−3.4%
2021	1,096	−4.1%

Source: Censuses

== Transport ==
The I/45 road from Bruntál to Krnov runs through the municipality.

Zátor is located on the railway line Opava–Rýmařov.

== Sights ==
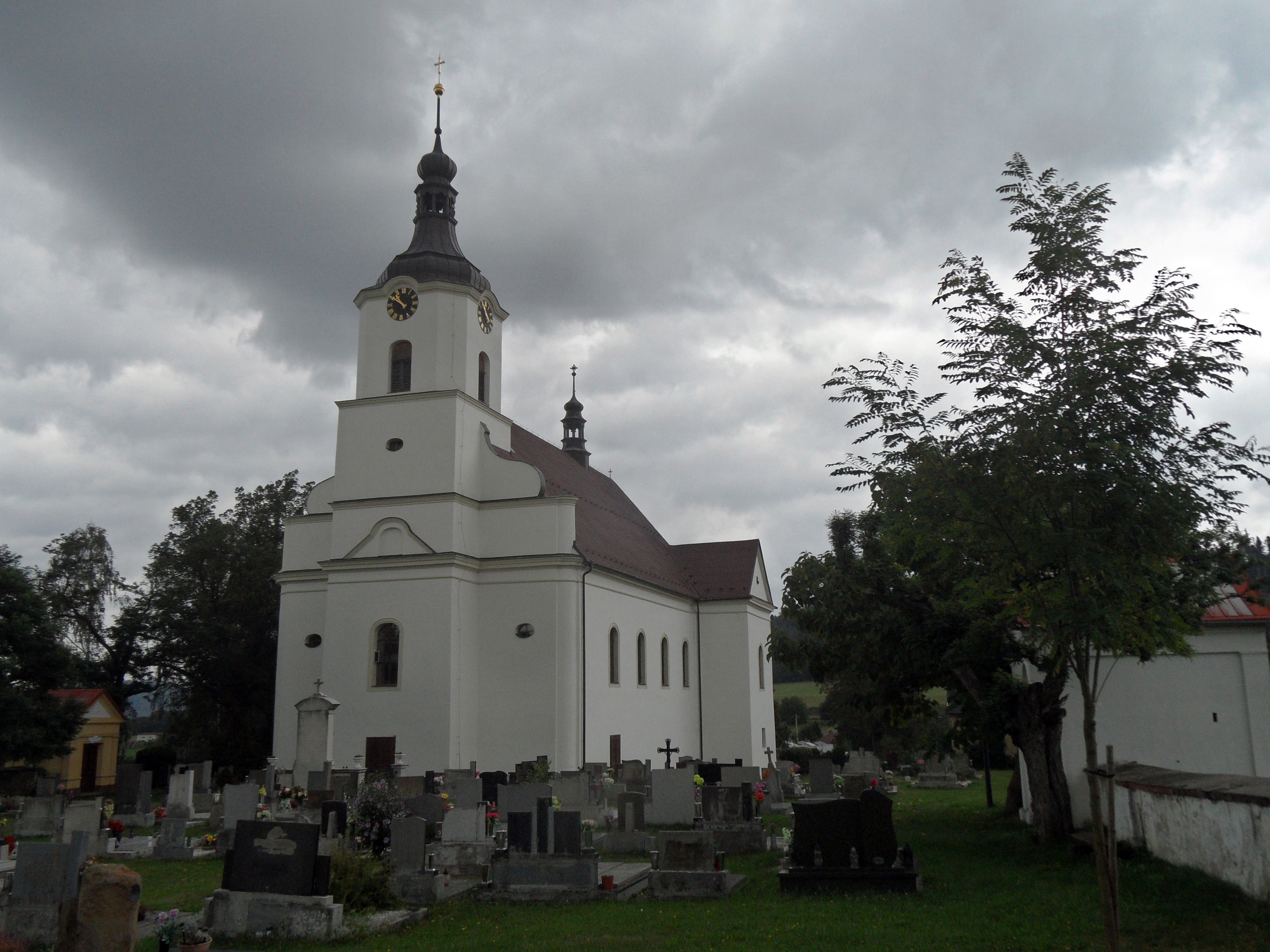
Church of the Holy Trinity

The main landmark of Zátor is the Church of the Holy Trinity. It was built in the Baroque style in 1753–1755. The church and its cemetery are surrounded by a wall in which Neoclassical chapels are built.

== Notable people ==
- Johann Rudolf Kutschker (1810–1881), Austrian cardinal
- Jan Štefela (born 2001), high jumper
