= Anton Josef Gruscha =

Austrian cardinal

His Eminence Anton Josef Gruscha
- Cardinal, Archbishop of Vienna
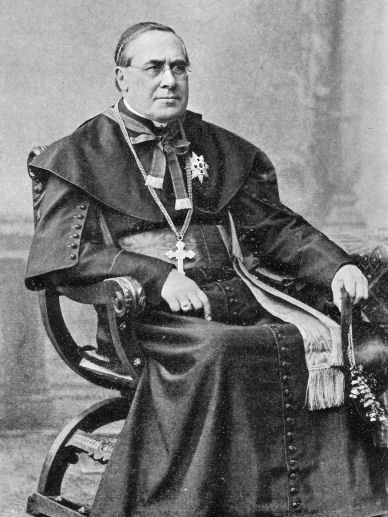
- Church: Roman Catholic
- Archdiocese: Vienna
- Installed: 6 July 1890
- Term ended: 5 August 1911
- Predecessor: Cölestin Josef Ganglbauer
- Successor: Franz Xaver Nagl
- Other post: Cardinal-Priest of Santa Maria degli Angeli (1891–1911)
- Previous post: Bishop of the Military Ordinariate of Austria (1878–1890)

Orders
- Ordination: 4 May 1843
- Consecration: 28 April 1878
- Created cardinal: 1 June 1891 by Leo XIII
- Rank: Cardinal-Priest

Personal details
- Born: 3 November 1820 Vienna, Austrian Empire
- Died: 5 August 1911 (aged 90) Kirchberg am Wechsel, Austro-Hungarian Empire
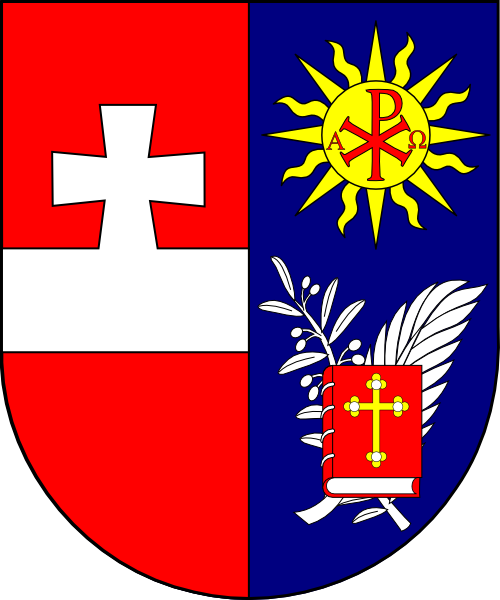
- Coat of arms

Styles of Anton Josef Gruscha
- Reference style: His Eminence
- Spoken style: Your Eminence
- Informal style: Cardinal
- See: Vienna

Anton Josef Gruscha, S.T.D. (3 November 1820, Vienna – 5 August 1911, Schloss Kranichberg, Lower Austria) was a Cardinal of the Roman Catholic Church and was Archbishop of Vienna.

He was born in Vienna, Austria. He received minor orders on 31 October 1839, the subdiaconate on 9 July 1842, the diaconate 15 July 1842. He was ordained on 4 May 1843. He attended the University of Vienna, where he earned a doctorate in theology in 1849.

After his ordination he worked in the Archdiocese of Vienna in the parish of Saint Leopold. He was also a professor of religion in the gymnasium of the Theresian Academy, a preacher in the metropolitan cathedral, and a professor of pastoral theology in the university. He was created Privy chamberlain supernumerary of His Holiness.

== Episcopate ==
Pope Leo XIII appointed him titular bishop of Carre and an Auxiliary Bishop of Vienna on 28 March 1878. He was promoted to the metropolitan see of Vienna on 23 June 1890.

== Cardinalate ==
On 1 June 1891, Pope Leo created him a cardinal priest. He was assigned the titular church of Santa Maria degli Angeli in the consistory of 14 December 1891. He participated in the conclave of 1903 that elected Pope Pius X and refused to issue the veto of Emperor Franz Josef I against Cardinal Rampolla; however, that veto was issued by Cardinal Puzyna. Cardinal Gruscha died in 1911.

Catholic Church titles
Preceded by Cölestin Josef Ganglbauer, O.S.B	Archbishop of Vienna; 23 June 1890 – 5 August 1911	Succeeded by Franz Xaver Nagl
Records
Preceded by François-Marie-Benjamin Richard	Oldest living Member of the Sacred College; 28 January 1908 - 5 August 1911	Succeeded by Alfonso Capecelatro
