= Guglielmo Pallotta =

Italian Roman Catholic Cardinal

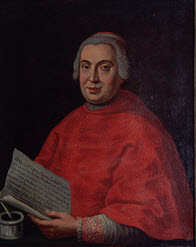
Guglielmo Pallotta

Guglielmo Pallotta (13 November 1727 – 21 September 1795) was an Italian Roman Catholic Cardinal.

== Biography ==
Born in Macerata, Marche, he studied hydraulics and law in Rome and then was ordained priest. Later he became auditor of Cardinal Carlo Rezzonico and served in the Fabric of Saint Peter. In 1773 he was named Treasurer general of the Apostolic Camera.

Pallotta was created cardinal priest in the consistory of 23 June 1777 by Pope Pius VI with the title of Sant'Eusebio. On 23 September 1782, he was opted for the title of Santa Maria degli Angeli e dei Martiri and was subsequently named Prefect of the S.C. of Waters, Fountains and Canals. On 1 July 1785, he was made prefect of the S.C. of the Council of Trent until his death. Pallotta was also Camerlengo of the Sacred College of Cardinals from 29 January 1787 to 1788.

He died in 1795 in Rome.

== Sources ==
- del Re, Nicola (1964). "I cardinali prefetti della sacra congregazione del concilio dalle origini ad oggi (1564-1964)". Apollinaris. XXXVII: 130–131.
