= Antonio del Duca =

Antonio del Duca or Lo Duca (Cefalù 1491 – Rome 1564) was the Sicilian friar whose persistent campaign for an official veneration of the "Seven Angelic Princes" was partly answered in the dedication of Santa Maria degli Angeli e dei Martiri, constructed to the orders of Pope Pius IV within the ruins of the Baths of Diocletian.

== Life ==
Antonio had been obsessed with the cult of the angels since the days when he was choirmaster in the cathedral of Palermo, 1513–15. At that time he discovered in the little Church of Sant'Angelo an ancient icon of the Seven Angelic Princes that emerged almost by a miracle after centuries of neglect. Fired with his faith, he traveled to Rome, harboring the intention of obtaining formal recognition of these Sette Principi angelici. In Rome he obtained a post as chaplain to Antonio Maria Cardinal Ciocchi del Monte, uncle of the future Pope Julius III. For the cardinal he composed a liturgy for a Mass of the Seven Angels.

After his patron's death in 1533, he served as chaplain to don Fernando de Silva, conde de Cifuentes, ambassador of Charles V, Holy Roman Emperor, never failing to seek official approval for his liturgy. In vain were his importunings of Pope Paul III Farnese, who assigned him duties that returned him to his native Sicily. Once again in Rome, he became chaplain in Santa Maria di Loreto in Trajan's Forum. There, one summer morning in 1541 he had a beatific vision of the Seven Martyr Saints— Saints Saturnino, Ciriaco, Largo, Smaragdo, Sisinnio, Trasone and Pope Marcellus I— revealed in a white light within the ruins of the Baths of Diocletian. From that moment he was fixated on seeing a church dedicated to those built within the ruins. He inscribed seven of the great red granite Roman columns of the caldarium with the names in his list of Seven Archangels: the three familiar ones, Michael, Raphael, and Gabriel, with the archangels specific to the Eastern Catholic rites: (Note: Sicily had been a Byzantine possession until the Muslim Arab conquest of 827-902) Selaphiel, Jegudiel, Barachiel and Uriel. His beseeching letter of 13 November 1546 to Signora Lucrezia della Rovere-Colonna to intercede with Paul III on behalf of the project: it must have been one among many.

In 1543 he combined a pilgrimage to the Santa Casa di Loreto with a trip to Venice to have the booklet of his liturgy printed, with prayers and images of the angels and while he was there commissioned a copy of the mosaic in the Basilica of San Marco depicting the Virgin among the Seven Angels, (Note: The painting hangs at the centre of the apse of Santa Maria degli Angeli e dei Martiri.) In Rome once more, Antonio accepted the rectorship of the Orfanelli di Santa Maria in Aquiro, continuing to frequent the thermae and pressing Paul III to consecrate the grand Roman ruin to the Beatissima Vergine dei Sette Arcangeli. Finally the construction was authorized by Pope Pius IV, in a brief of 27 July 1561 that dedicated the church to the "Beatissimae Virgini et omnium Angelorum et Martyrum", "the most Holy Virgin and all the Angels and Martyrs", and conceded the direction to the Cistercians of Santa Croce in Gerusalemme. The designer of the new church was Michelangelo, one of his last commissions.

== Sources ==
- Bailey, Gauvin Alexander. Between Renaissance and Baroque: Jesuit Art in Rome, 1565–1610. University of Toronto Press, 2003.
- Manzi, Pietro. La tipografia napoletana nel '500. Naples, 1971.
- (in Danish) Biography of Antonio Lo Duca
