= Richard Gottheil =

English–American scholar and Zionist (1862–1936)

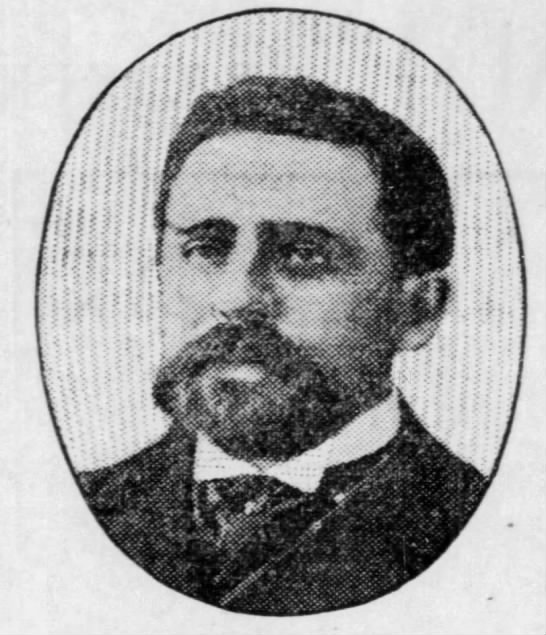
- Born: 13 October 1862
- Died: 22 May 1936
- Occupations: Professor, orientalist, librarian, university teacher, philologist

Richard James Horatio Gottheil (13 October 1862 – 22 May 1936) was an English American Semitic scholar, Zionist, founding father of Zeta Beta Tau fraternity, and one of the founders of the Jewish Institute of Religion in New York.

== Biography ==
He was born in Manchester, England, but moved to the United States at age 11 when his father, Gustav Gottheil, accepted a position as the assistant Rabbi of the largest Reform synagogue in New York, Temple Emanu-El. He graduated from Columbia College in 1881, and studied also in Europe, earning his doctorate at the University of Leipzig in 1886. Gottheil was a professor of Semitic languages at Columbia University from 1886 until his death. He was also director of the Oriental Department of the New York Public Library from 1896 until his death.

From 1898 to 1904 he was president of the American Federation of Zionists, and worked with both Stephen S. Wise and Jacob De Haas as organizational secretaries. Though he was ever desirous of returning to the quiet life of academia, Gottheil attended the Second Zionist Congress in Basel, establishing relationships with Theodor Herzl and Max Nordau. "Professor Gottheil shunned publicity; he did not mind the trickles of adulation accorded him as President; but his official duties irked him beyond endurance. He hated to preside at meetings. He was careless in procedural matters and embarrassed by ceremonies in which he had to take part. He was horrified by emotional debates. He felt that his status as a professor was being sullied by his being President of a propaganda organization. He ran away from official duties. He usually limited his official addresses at Zionist meetings to the necessary items, speaking briefly. He became more and more nerve-provoked by his status, especially as the practical affairs of the Zionist Federation made no visible progress." Gottheil virtually vanished from the Zionist movement for the rest of his life. He continued writing and supporting the Zionist effort, but he never again undertook a leadership role.

Letter (1933)

After 1904 he was vice president of the American Jewish Historical Society. Gottheil wrote many articles on Oriental and Jewish questions for newspapers and reviews. He edited the Columbia University Oriental Series, and the Semitic Study Series. After 1901 he was one of the editors of the Jewish Encyclopedia. He wrote the chapter on Zionism which was translated into Arabic and published by Najib Nassar in his newspaper Al-Karmil and also in the form of a book in 1911.

He died on 22 May 1936.

== Publications ==
- The Syriac grammar of Mar Elia Zobha (1887)
- Selections from the Syriac Julian Romance (1906)
- Zionism (1914)
