= Sant'Eusebio =

- St. Eusebius (in English); Sancti Eusebii (in Latin)
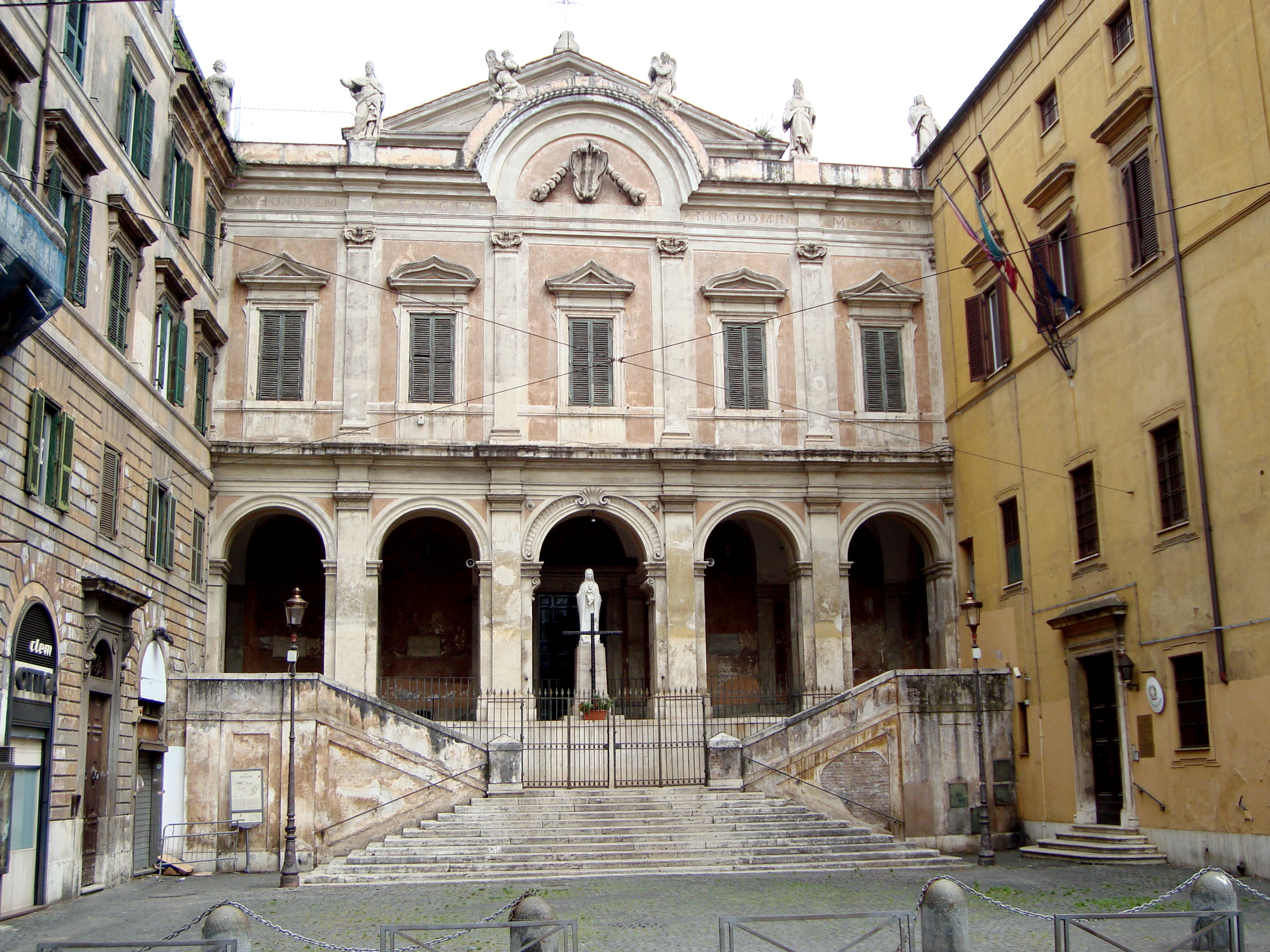
- Facade
- Click on the map for a fullscreen view
- 41°53′47″N 12°30′13″E
- Location: Piazza Vittorio Emanuele II, Rome
- Country: Italy
- Denomination: Roman Catholic
- Tradition: Roman Rite

History
- Status: Titular church
- Dedication: Eusebius of Rome

Architecture
- Architectural type: Church
- Groundbreaking: 12th century

Sant'Eusebio is a titular church in Rome, devoted to Saint Eusebius of Rome, a 4th-century martyr, and built in the Esquilino rione. One of the oldest churches in Rome, it is a titular church and the station church for the Friday after the fourth Sunday in Lent.

== History ==
The church is said to have been built on the site of the house of the priest and confessor, Eusebius of Rome, who died c. 357. It is recorded as the Titulus Eusebii in the acts of the 499 synod. It is again mentioned in the acts of a council held in Rome under Pope Symmachus in 498. The church was rebuilt by Pope Zacharias, and was consecrated "in honorem beatorum Eusebii et Vincentii" by Pope Gregory IX, after the restoration of 1238. A plaque commemorating the rebuilding is located on the porch of the church.

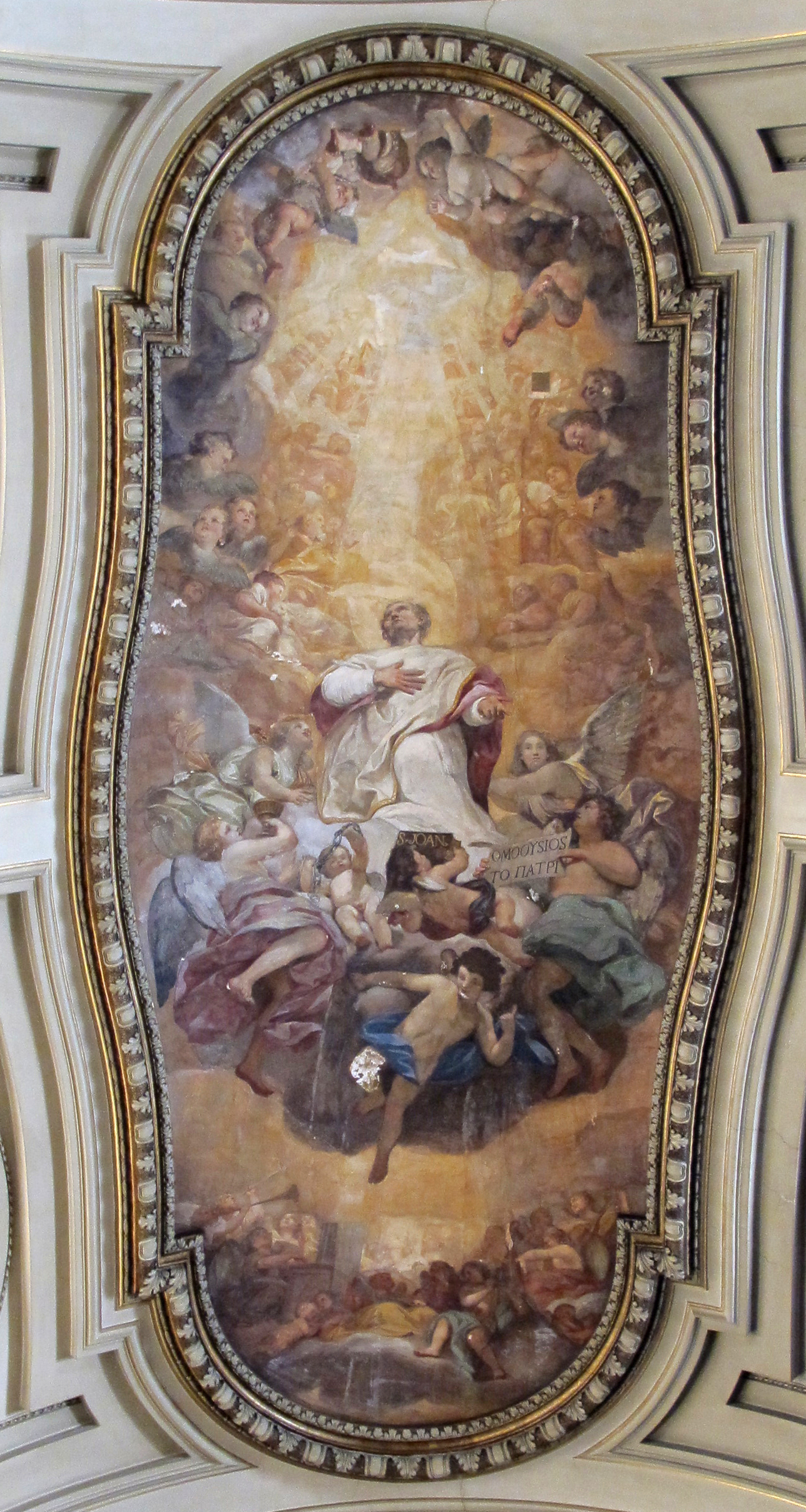
Glory of Sant'Eusebio, (1757) Anton Raphael Mengs

The Romanesque style, dating back to this restoration, survived to the restorations of the 17th, 18th, and 20th centuries. The church once belonged to the Celestines. The annexed monastery housed one of the first printing workshop in the city. In 1627, the monastery was raised from a priory to an abbey, but abolished in 1810. The order subsequently became extinct. Pope Leo XII gave Sant'Eusebio to the Jesuits. After the Jesuits were expelled in 1873, the monastery was seized by the state, and Sant'Eusebio eventually became a parish church staffed by diocesan clergy.

The small piazza outside the church hosts an annual blessing for the animals on the 17 January – the feast of St. Anthony the Abbot. The tradition dates back to 1437 and was transferred to Sant'Eusebio in the early 20th century from the nearby Church of Sant’Antonio Abate.

The Titulus Sancti Eusebii is held by Cardinal Daniel DiNardo, Archbishop Emeritus of Galveston-Houston in Texas, US.

== Architecture ==
Roman ruins dating back to the second century have been discovered underneath the present building. It is first mentioned in 474, in an inscription in the catacombs of Saints Marcellino e Pietro. However, archeological remains suggest an original construction date of around the turn of the fifth century.

Only the bell tower remains of Gregory IX's renovations. The five-arched portico was erected in 1711.

== Interior ==
The interior is separated into a nave with two flanking aisles. The present design dates to 1600 work by Onorio Longhi, who restored the presbytery, main altar, and choir. The ceiling fresco is a neoclassical masterpiece of Anton Raphael Mengs depicting the Glory of Sant'Eusebio (1757).

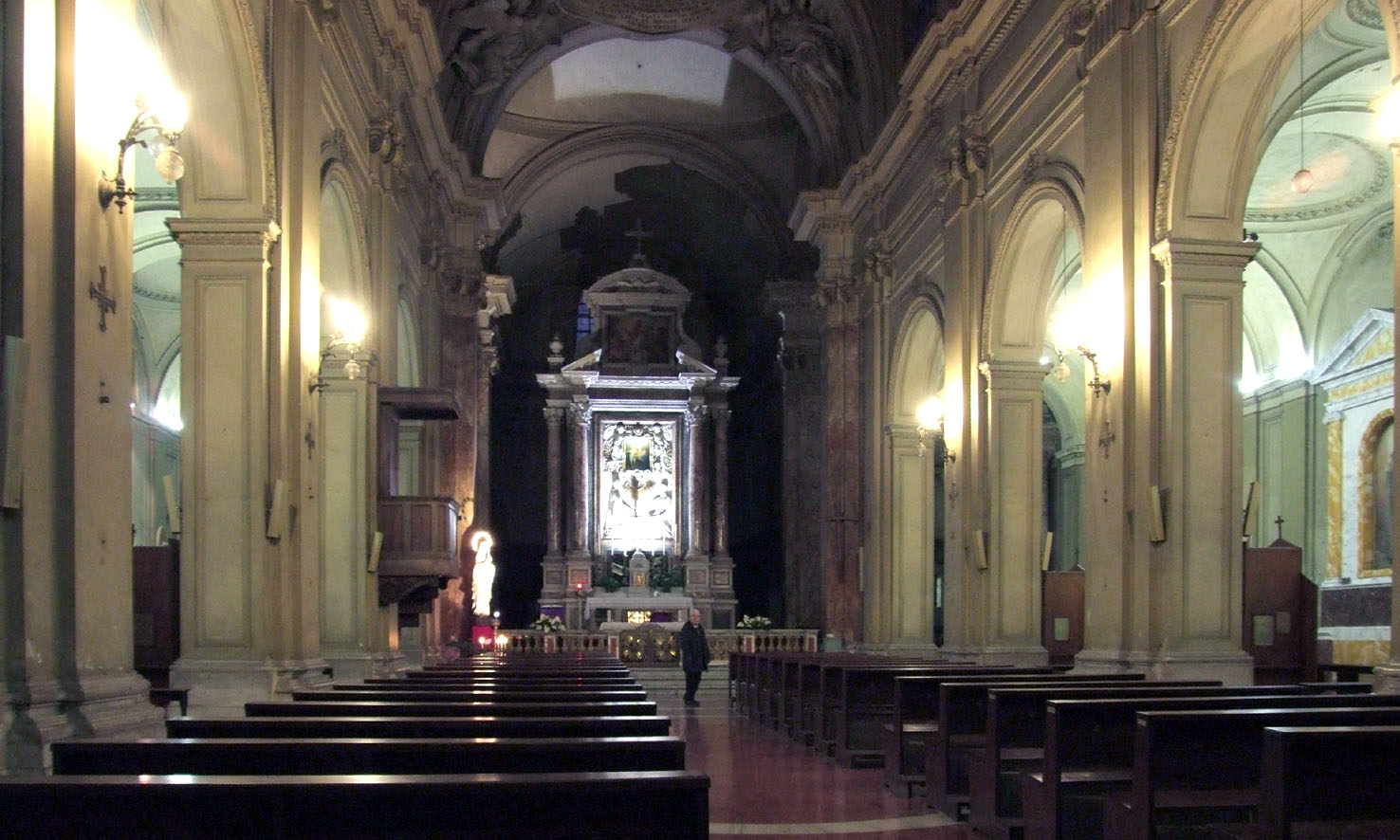
Interior

Other paintings in the church are attributed to Giuseppe Passeri (central nave window), Andreas Ruthart (choir, c. 1672), Baldassarre Croce (Jesus, Mary, and Saints near the main altar), Cesare Rossetti (Crucifix at the main altar facing choir), Pompeo Batoni (Madonna and Bambino near main altar) and Francesco Solimena.

The main altar has custody of the relics of St Eusebius of Rome, who is supposed to have commissioned and financed construction of the church in the 4th century.

== List of Cardinal Priests ==
- Valentine (492 - 494)
- Probian (494 - ?)
- Bono (590 - ?)
- Stephen (745 - 761)
- Theopempt (761 - ?)
- Lucian (827 ? - 853)
- Lucinus (853 - ?)
- Robert of Paris (1088 - 1112/5)
- John, O.S.B. (c. 1114 - 1121)
- Robert (1121 - 1123)
- Pierre 1130–1130, pseudo-cardinal of the Antipope Anacletus II
- Robert Pullen (c. 1142–46)
- Raniero 1165-1178
- Ruggerio 1178-1221
- Nicolas de Fréauville, OP 15 March 1305 – 15 January 1323
- Raymond de Mostuejouls 28 December 1327 – 12 November 1335
- Giovanni Visconti (archbishop of Milan) 19 Jan 1329-5 Oct 1354
- Etienne de Poissy 22 September 1368 – 16 October 1373
- Guglielmo Sanseverino 18 September 1378 – 24 November 1378
- Francesco Moricotti Rignani Butillo November 1378-July 1380
- Henry Beaufort 27 May 1426 – 11 July 1447
- Astorgio Agnensi 3 January 1449 – 10 October 1451
- Richard Olivier de Longueil 16 March 1462 – 17 August 1470
- Oliviero Carafa 5 September 1470 – 24 July 1476; 24 July 1476 – 20 January 1511
- Pietro Accolti 17 March 1511 – 18 December 1523; 18 December 1523 – 5 May 1527
- Benedetto Accolti 5 May 1527 – 27 August 1534; 30 August 1530 – 21 September 1549
- Francisco Mendoza de Bobadilla 28 February 1550 – 1 December 1566
- Antonio Carafa 5 April 1568 – 8 April 1573; 12 December 1583 – 28 November 1584
- Giulio Canani 28 November 1584 – 20 March 1591
- Camillo Borghese 21 June 1596 – 10 March 1599
- Arnaud d'Ossat 17 March 1559 – 13 March 1604
- Ferdinando Taverna 25 June 1604 – 29 August 1619
- Jean de Bonsi 3 March 1621 – 4 July 1621
- Marcantonio Gozzadini 30 August 1621 – 23 May 1623
- Giacomo Cavalieri 9 February 1626 – 28 January 1629
- Giovanni Battista Pamphilj 12 August 1630 – 15 September 1644
- Girolamo Grimaldi-Cavalleroni 17 October 1644 – 11 October 1655
- Nicola Guidi di Bagno 23 April 1657 – 27 August 1663
- Paolo Emilio Rondinini 30 April 1668 – 16 September 1669
- Carlo Gualterio 15 January 1669 – 1 January 1673
- Camillo Massimo 30 January 1673 – 19 October 1676
- Pierre di Bonzi 28 November 1689 – 11 July 1703
- Francesco Martelli 25 June 1706 – 29 September 1717
- Imre Csáky 16 June 1721 – 28 August 1732
- Pompeo Aldrovandi 12 April 1734 – 6 January 1752
- Enrico Enriquez 22 July 1754 – 25 April 1756
- Jean-François-Joseph de Rochechouart 5 January 1762 – 20 March 1777
- Guglielmo Pallotta 28 July 1777 – 23 September 1782
- Giovanni Andrea Archetti 27 June 1785 – 2 April 1800
- Giuseppe Firrao 20 July 1801 – 24 January 1830
- Paolo Polidori 1 August 1834 – 12 July 1841
- Johann Rudolf Kutschker 25 June 1877 – 27 January 1881
- Domenico Agostini 20 March 1882 – 7 June 1886
- Cölestin Josef Ganglbauer, OSB 10 June 1886 – 14 December 1889
- Joseph-Alfred Foulon 30 December 1889 – 23 January 1893
- Benito Sanz y Forés 15 June 1893 – 1 November 1895
- Antonio María Cascajares y Azara 25 June 1896 – 24 March 1898
- Agostino Richelmy 22 June 1899 – 27 November 1911
- János Csernoch 8 September 1914 – 26 July 1927
- Carlo Dalmazio Minoretti 19 December 1929-13 March 1938
- Juan Gualberto Guevara 28 February 1946 – 27 November 1954
- Franz König 18 December 1958 – 13 March 2004
- Daniel DiNardo 24 November 2007 – present
