= Eusebius of Rome =

Italian Roman Catholic saint

Saint Eusebius

Confessor of the Faith
- Born: 4th century
- Died: 357; Rome
- Venerated in: Catholic Church, Eastern Orthodox Church
- Major shrine: Sant'Eusebio church, Rome
- Feast: 14 August

Eusebius of Rome (died c. 357), the founder of the church on the Esquiline Hill in Rome that bears his name, is listed in the Roman Martyrology as one of the saints venerated on 14 August.

== Life ==
Eusebius is said to have been a Roman patrician and priest, and is mentioned with distinction in Latin martyrologies. The Martyrology of Usuard styles him confessor at Rome under the Arian emperor Constantius II and adds that he was buried in the cemetery of Callistus. Some later martyrologies call him a martyr.

A fictionalised version of his conflict with Julian the Apostate is found in the Julian Romance.

== Veneration ==
Sant'Eusebio, the basilica-style church on the Esquiline in Rome dedicated to him, is said to have been built on the site of his house.

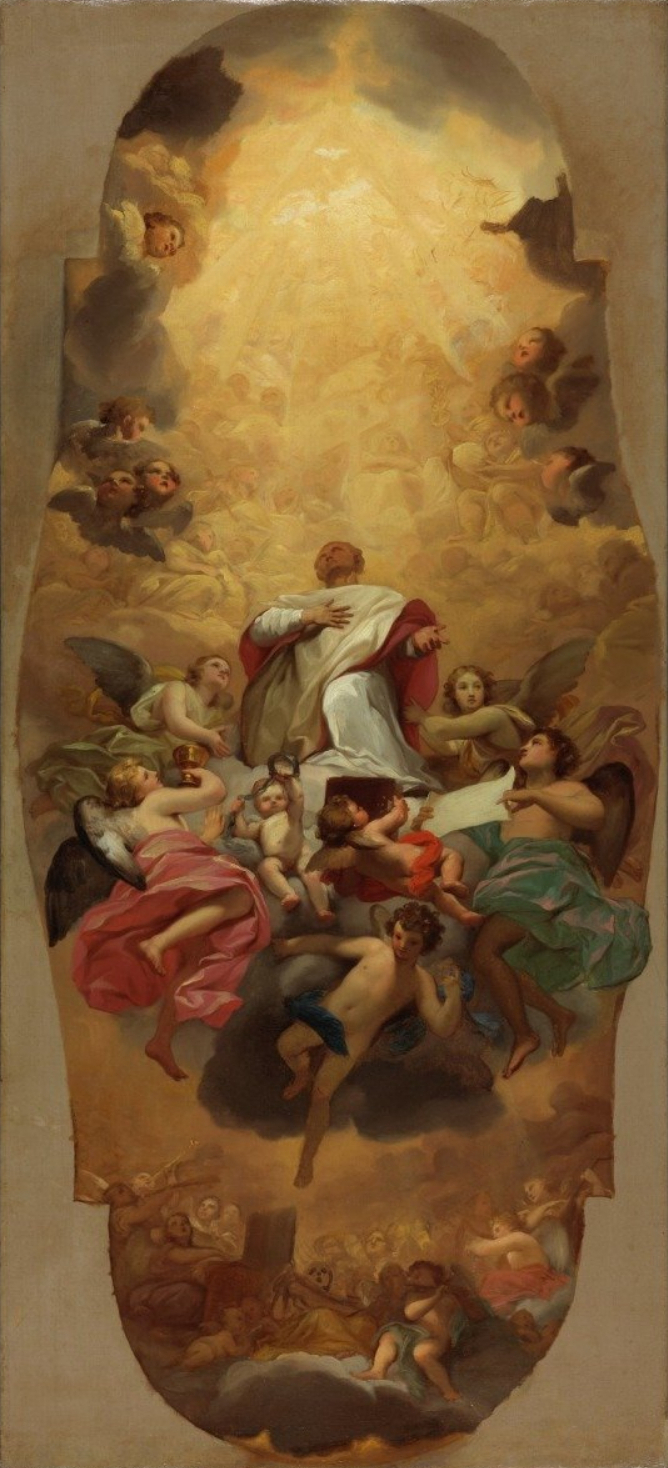
Glory of Saint Eusebius of Rome (1757), Anton Raphael Mengs

The "Acta Eusebii", discovered in 1479 by Mombritius and reproduced by Baluze in his "Miscellanea" (1678–1715), tell the following story: When Pope Liberius was permitted by Constantius II to return to Rome, supposedly at the price of his orthodoxy, by subscribing to the Arian formula of Sirmium, Eusebius, a priest, an ardent defender of the Nicene Creed, publicly preached against both pope and emperor, branding them as heretics. When the orthodox party who supported the antipope Felix were excluded from all the churches, Eusebius continued to say Mass in his own house. He was arrested and brought before Liberius and Constantius, and boldly reproved Liberius for deserting the Catholic faith. In consequence he was placed in a dungeon four feet wide (or was imprisoned in his own house), where he spent his time in prayer and died after seven months. His body was buried in the cemetery of Callistus with the simple inscription: "Eusebio homini Dei". This act of kindness was performed by two priests, Gregory and Orosius, friends of Eusebius. Gregory was put into the same prison and also died there. He was buried by Orosius, who professes to be the writer of the Acts.

It is generally admitted that these Acts were a forgery either entirely or at least in part, and written in the same spirit if not by the same hand as the notice on Liberius in the "Liber Pontificalis". The Bollandists and Tillemont point out some historical difficulties in the narrative, especially the fact that Liberius, Constantius, and Eusebius were never in Rome at the same time. Constantius visited Rome but once, and remained there for about a month, and Liberius was then still in exile. Some, taking for granted the alleged fall of Liberius, would overcome this difficulty by stating that, at the request of Liberius, who resented the zeal of the priest, the secular power interfered and imprisoned Eusebius. It is not at all certain whether Eusebius died after the return of Liberius, during his exile, or even much before that period.

The Tridentine calendar had a commemoration of Eusebius, after that of the commemoration of the vigil of the feast of the Assumption of Mary on 14 August, on which day the main liturgy was that of the feast of Lawrence of Rome, within whose octave it fell. The 1920 typical edition of the Roman Missal omitted the celebration on that date of the day within the Octave of Saint Lawrence. The Vigil of the Assumption became the principal liturgy, with a commemoration of Eusebius alone. The 1969 revision of the calendar removed the commemoration of Eusebius, while sanctioning the celebration of his feast in the Roman basilica that bears his name.
