= Friedrich Gustav Piffl =

Cardinal of the Catholic Church and Archbishop of Vienna (1864–1932)

His Eminence Friedrich Gustav Piffl
- Cardinal, Archbishop of Vienna
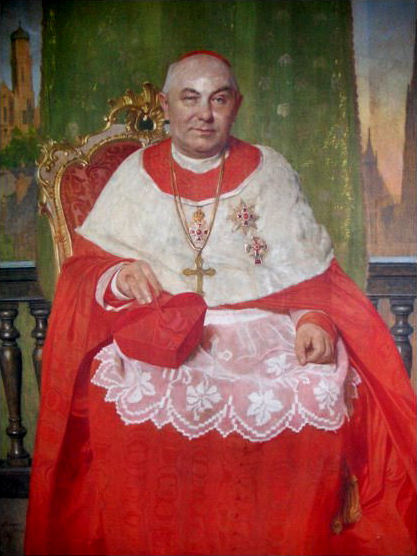
- Church: Catholic Church
- Archdiocese: Vienna
- Installed: 1 June 1913
- Term ended: 21 April 1932
- Predecessor: Franz Xaver Nagl
- Successor: Theodor Innitzer
- Other post: Cardinal-Priest of San Marco

Orders
- Ordination: 8 January 1888
- Consecration: 1 June 1913
- Created cardinal: 25 May 1914 by Pius X
- Rank: Cardinal-Priest

Personal details
- Born: 15 October 1864 Lanškroun, Austrian Empire (Present day Czech Republic)
- Died: 21 April 1932 (aged 67) Vienna, Austria
- Buried: St. Stephen's Cathedral, Vienna
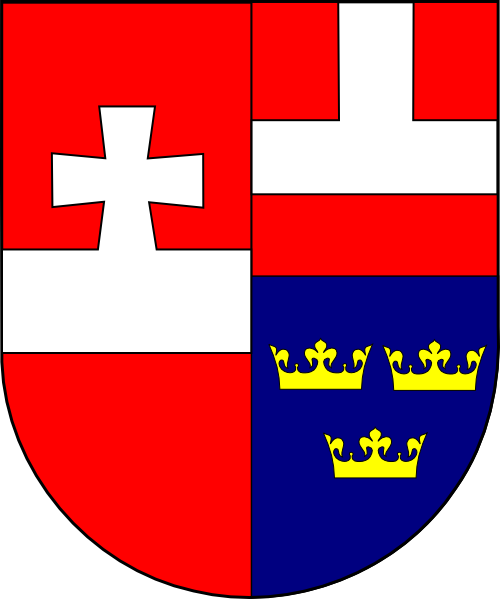
- Coat of arms

Styles of Friedrich Gustav Piffl
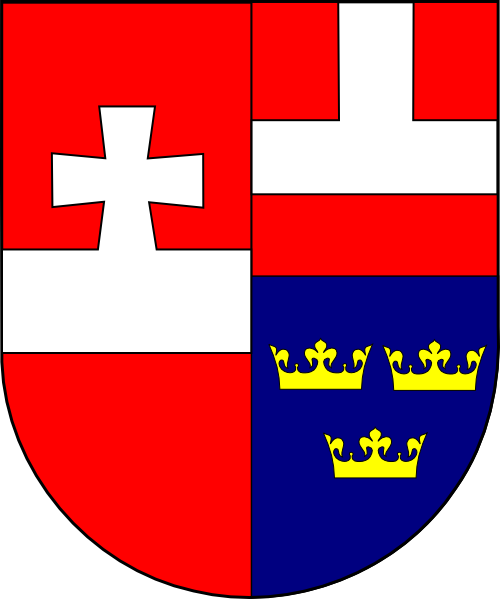
- Reference style: His Eminence
- Spoken style: Your Eminence
- Informal style: Cardinal
- See: Vienna

Friedrich Gustav Piffl (15 October 1864 – 21 April 1932) was a Cardinal of the Catholic Church and Archbishop of Vienna.

== Early life and education ==
Gustav Piffl was born in Lanškroun, Bohemia, in what was then the Austrian Empire. His father, Rudolf Piffl, was a bookseller and shopkeeper. He volunteered for a year in the Austrian army as a young man. After deciding to become a priest he enrolled in the Teutonic College of Santa Maria in Camposanto in Rome and later became an Augustinian canon at the Abbey of Klosterneuburg, Austria, in 1883. His name in religion was Friedrich. He finished his theological studies at the University of Vienna.

== Priesthood ==
He was ordained on 8 January 1888 and served afterwards as a priest in various parishes of the Archdiocese of Vienna. He was the pastor of Klosterneuburg's abbey church until 1913 and led the community as its provost from 1907 to 1913.

== Episcopate ==
Pope Pius X appointed him Archbishop of Vienna on 2 May 1913. He was consecrated on 1 June 1913. Pope Pius raised him to the cardinalate, creating him Cardinal-Priest of S. Marco on 25 May 1914. He participated in the conclaves of 1914 that elected Pope Benedict XV and 1922 that elected Pope Pius XI. Piffl presided at the funeral of Austria's Emperor Franz Josef.

Piffl visited the United States in 1926, giving the opening address (in German) at Chicago's Eucharistic Congress.

He was not born an aristocrat (his father was a book-binder), but received the title of prince-archbishop of Vienna, holding office at the dissolution of Austria-Hungary in 1918. When he died in 1932 in Vienna at the age of 67, he was the last to hold the title.

Catholic Church titles
| Preceded by Franz Xaver Nagl | Archbishop of Vienna; 2 May 1913 – 21 April 1932 | Succeeded by Theodor Innitzer |
