= Giacomo Cavalieri =

Catholic cardinal

His Eminence Giacomo Cavalieri
- Cardinal-Priest of Sant'Eusebio
- See: Datary of His Holiness
- Installed: 15 September 1623 – 28 January 1629

Orders
- Created cardinal: 19 January 1626

Personal details
- Born: 1565 Rome, Italy
- Died: 28 January 1629 (aged 63–64) Tivoli, Italy

Giacomo Cavalieri (Rome, 1565 – Tivoli, 28 January 1629) was born in Rome in 1565 to Giacomo Cavalieri and Diana Santori, related to the Borghese and Paluzzi Albertoni families. He became referendary of the Tribunal of the Apostolic Signature in the Roman Curia and governor of Faenza and Città di Castello and auditor of the Roman Rota. On 15 September 1623, he was appointed datary of His Holiness.

Pope Urban VIII created him cardinal priest in the consistory of 19 January 1626. He opted for the title of Sant'Eusebio on 9 February 1626. He died on 28 January 1629 in Tivoli.
