= Franz Xaver Nagl =

Catholic cardinal (1855–1913)

His Eminence Franz Xaver Nagl
- Cardinal, Archbishop of Vienna
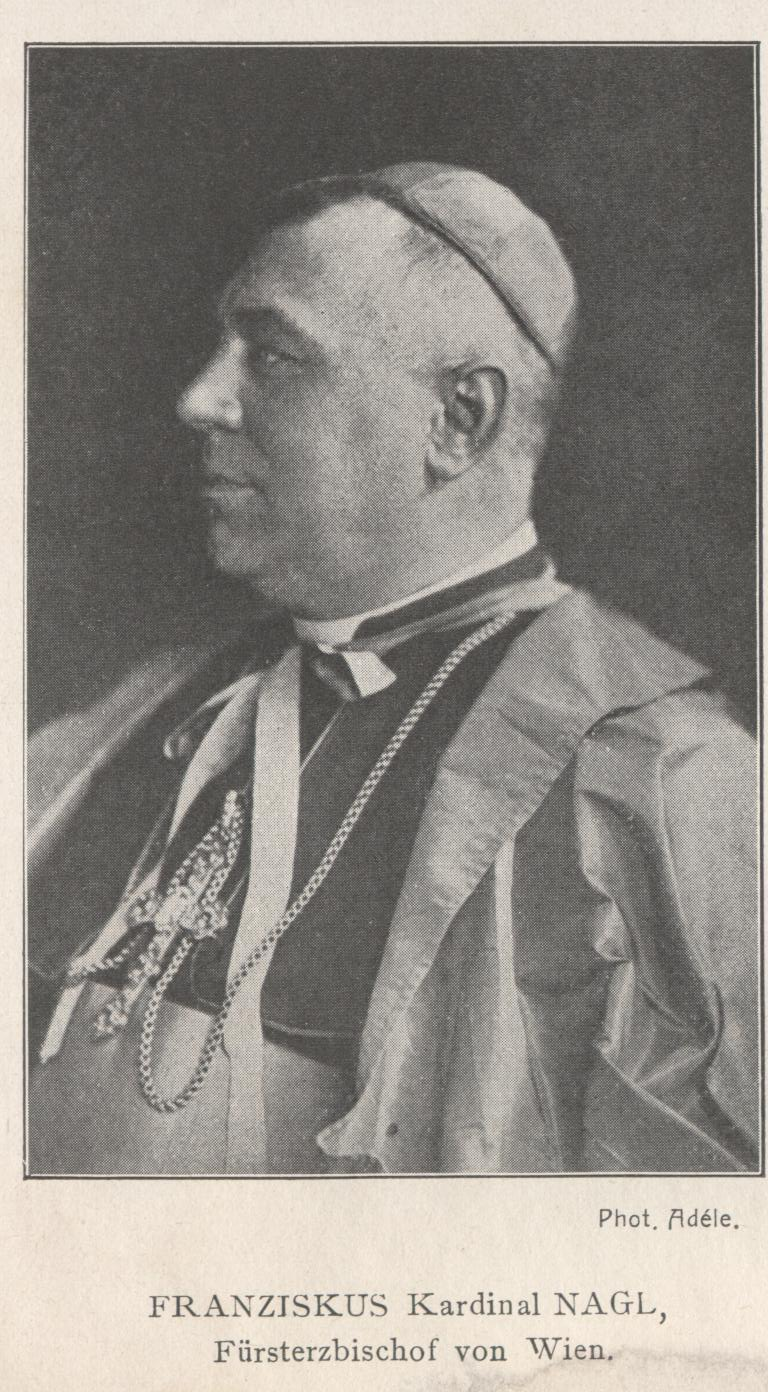
- Church: Catholic
- Archdiocese: Vienna
- Installed: 24 September 1911
- Term ended: 4 February 1913
- Predecessor: Anton Josef Gruscha
- Successor: Friedrich Gustav Piffl
- Other post: Cardinal-Priest of San Marco
- Previous posts: Bishop of Trieste e Capodistria (1902–1910); Coadjutor Archbishop of Vienna (1910–1911)

Orders
- Ordination: 14 July 1878
- Consecration: 15 June 1902
- Created cardinal: 27 November 1911 by Pius X
- Rank: Cardinal-Priest

Personal details
- Born: 26 November 1855 Vienna, Austrian Empire
- Died: 4 February 1913 (aged 57) Vienna, Austro-Hungarian Empire
- Buried: St. Stephen's Cathedral, Vienna
- Residence: Vienna
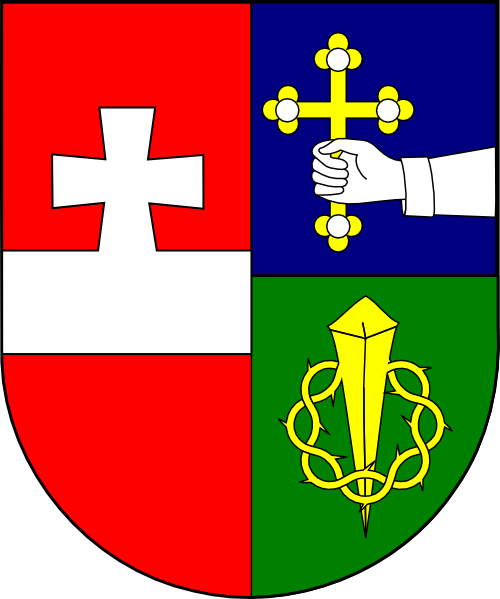
- Coat of arms

Styles of Franz Xaver Nagl
- Reference style: His Eminence
- Spoken style: Your Eminence
- Informal style: Cardinal
- See: Vienna

Franz Xaver Nagl S.T.D. (26 November 1855 – 4 February 1913) was a Cardinal of the Catholic Church and Archbishop of Vienna as well as titular Latin Archbishop of Tyre.

== Biography ==
Nagl was born in Vienna, Austria, as the son of Leopold Nagl, a doorman, and Barbara Kloiber. He was educated at the Seminary of Krems and later at the Seminary of Sankt Pölten from 1874 until 1878, then finally at the University of Vienna, where he earned a doctorate in theology in 1883. He was ordained on 14 July 1878 and did pastoral work in the archdiocese of Vienna until 1882, when he was appointed chaplain of S. Maria dell'Anima in Rome, where he served until 1883. He was professor of philosophy and exegesis at the Seminary of Sankt Pölten until 1885. He was Chaplain at the Imperial Court of Vienna from 1885 until 1887. He was Rector of the Priest College and Church S. Maria dell'Anima from 1889 until 1902. He was created Protonotary apostolic in 1893 and was Canon of the cathedral chapter of Vienna.

== Episcopate ==
Pope Leo XIII appointed him Bishop of Trieste and Capodistria on 2 June 1902, and he was consecrated on 15 June. He was promoted to the titular see of Tiro and appointed coadjutor bishop of Vienna on 19 January 1910, succeeding to the metropolitan see of Vienna on 5 August 1911.

== Cardinalate ==
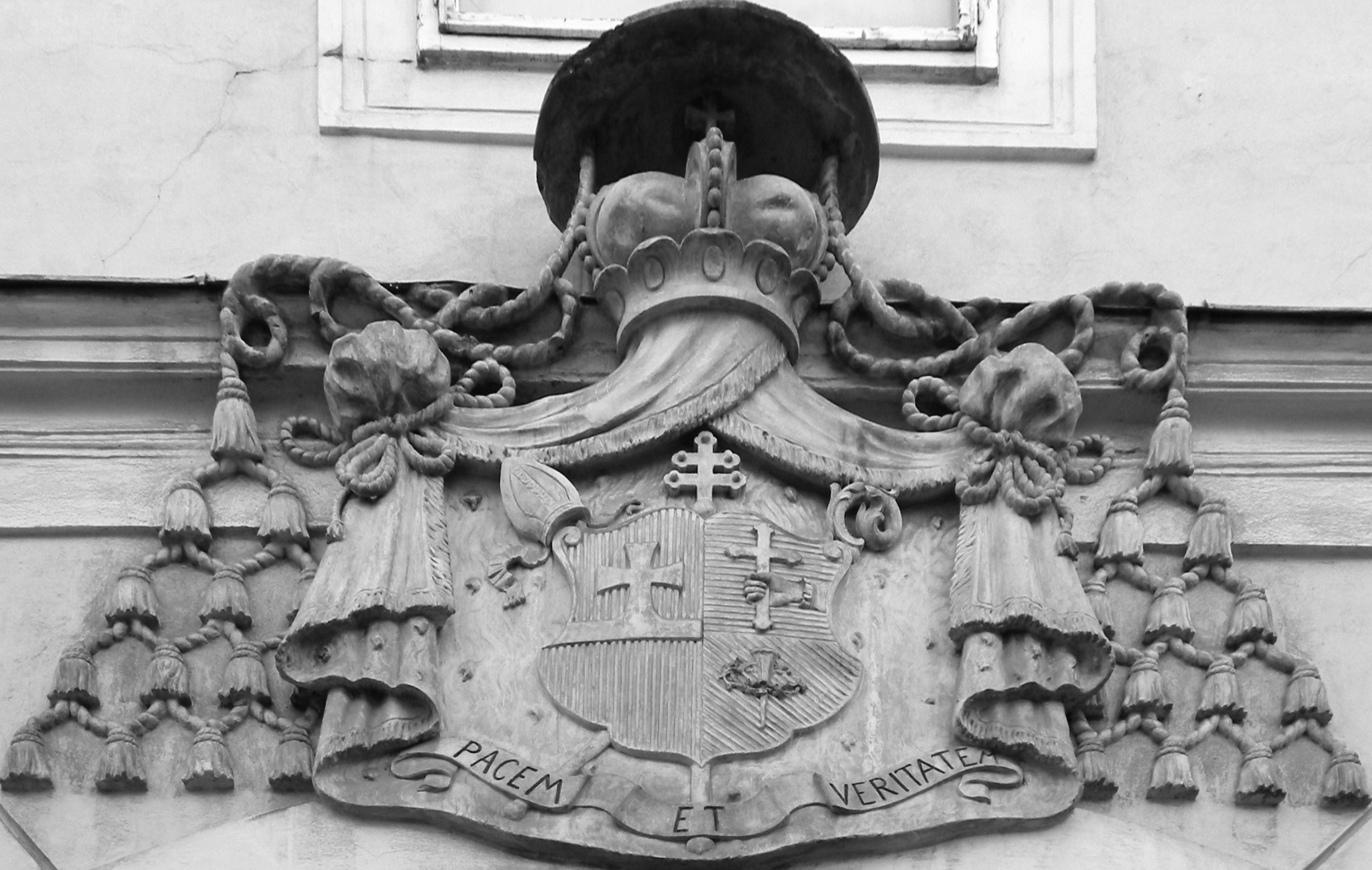
Coat of Arms of Cardinal Nagl

He was created Cardinal-Priest of San Marco in the consistory of 27 November 1911 by Pope Pius X.

During his time as Archbishop of Vienna he was a counselor to Emperor Franz Josef I of Austria and member of the Chamber of Lords and of the Landtag. He died in 1913.

Catholic Church titles
Preceded by Anton Josef Gruscha	Archbishop of Vienna; 5 August 1911 – 4 February 1913	Succeeded by Friedrich Gustav Piffl
