= China Center of Advanced Science and Technology =

Institute in China

The China Center of Advanced Science and Technology (CCAST; simplified Chinese: 中国高等科学技术中心; traditional Chinese: 中國高等科學技術中心; pinyin: Zhōngguó gāoděng kēxué jìshù zhōngxīn) was established on October 17, 1986, by the Chinese Academy of Sciences and the Chinese Government.

== History ==
The China Center of Advanced Science and Technology was established in 1986 with the support of the Chinese Academy of Sciences and the Chinese Government. It was through Professor T. D. Lee of Columbia University and the backing of the World Laboratory which the institution was founded. The purpose of the center was to introduce important frontier sciences and technologies to China. It was also to foster a suitable environment and to promote free exchange of scientific information between China and other countries.
