= Leyla Gencer =

Turkish operatic soprano (1928–2008)

Leyla Gencer as Antonina in Gaetano Donizetti's Belisario at La Fenice in Venice, 1969.

Leyla Gencer (Turkish pronunciation: [lejˈla ɟenˈdʒeɾ], née Çeyrekgil; 10 October 1928 – 10 May 2008) also known as La Diva Turca was a Turkish operatic soprano.

Gencer was a notable bel canto soprano who spent most of her career in Italy, from the early 1950s through the mid-1980s, and had a repertoire encompassing more than seventy roles. She made very few commercial recordings; however, numerous bootleg recordings of her performances exist. She was particularly associated with the heroines of Donizetti.

== Early life ==
Leyla Gencer was born in Polonezköy (near Istanbul) to a Turkish father and a Polish mother. Her father, Hasanzade İbrahim Bey (who took the surname Çeyrekgil under the Surname Law of 1934), was a wealthy businessman, whose family was from the city of Safranbolu. Her mother, Lexanda Angela Minakovska, was from a Roman Catholic family of the Lithuanian aristocracy (she later converted to Islam and chose the name Atiye after her husband's death.) Gencer's father died when she was very young during a flash flood. She grew up in the Çubuklu neighbourhood of Istanbul, on the Anatolian side of the Bosphorus strait. In 1946, she married İbrahim Gencer, a banker related to the influential İpekçi family.

== Education and early career ==
She began to study singing at the Istanbul Conservatory but dropped out to study privately in Ankara with her teacher the Italian soprano Giannina Arangi-Lombardi. After Arangi-Lombardi's death, Gencer continued her studies with the Italian baritone Apollo Granforte. She sang in the chorus of the Turkish State Theater until 1950, when she made her operatic debut in Ankara, as Santuzza in Cavalleria Rusticana. During the next few years, she became well known in Turkey and sang frequently at functions for the Turkish government.

== Career ==
In 1953, Gencer made her Italian debut at the Teatro di San Carlo in Naples as Santuzza. She returned to Naples the following year for performances of Madama Butterfly and Eugene Onegin. In 1957, she made her debut at La Scala in Milan as New Prioress in the world premiere of Poulenc's Dialogues of the Carmelites. She went on to appear regularly at La Scala, performing nineteen roles between 1957 and 1983 including Leonora in La forza del destino, Elisabetta in Don Carlos, the title role in Aida, Lady Macbeth in Macbeth, the title role in Norma, Ottavia in L'incoronazione di Poppea and Alceste. At La Scala, she also appeared as the First Woman of Canterbury in the world premiere of Pizzetti's L'assassinio nella cattedrale in 1958. In 1960, she toured the USSR, singing concerts in Moscow and Baku.

In 1962, she debuted at the Royal Opera House, Covent Garden as Elisabetta di Valois in Don Carlos and Donna Anna in Don Giovanni. Her United States debut had been at the San Francisco Opera in 1956, as Francesca in Zandonai's Francesca da Rimini. She sang in other American opera houses as well, but never at the Metropolitan Opera, despite discussions about her being engaged to sing Tosca there, also in 1956.

She sang Chopin's Polish songs in Paris with Nikita Magaloff, a Liszt-Bartók concert at La Scala, and a concert involving 'operas about Turks' in the Venetian carnival at La Fenice, showing her innovative character as an opera singer. Her last appearance on the operatic stage was in 1985, with La Prova di un'opera seria at La Fenice. She continued to appear in concerts until 1992. She was still active as of 2007, and had recently been appointed by La Scala's music director Riccardo Muti to run its school for young artists.

Throughout her career, Gencer was particularly well known for her Donizetti, including Belisario, Poliuto, Anna Bolena, Lucrezia Borgia, Maria Stuarda and Caterina Cornaro. Her most acclaimed and best-known performance, though, was the Roberto Devereux she sang in Naples in 1964. Aside from bel canto roles, her repertory included works by such composers as Prokofiev, Mozart and Puccini. She appeared in many rarely performed operas, including Smareglia's La Falena, Rossini's Elisabetta, regina d'Inghilterra, Spontini's Agnese di Hohenstaufen, Pacini's Saffo and Gluck's Alceste.

Gencer rose to international stardom in a short time, singing under some of the greatest Italian maestros, such as Vittorio Gui, Tullio Serafin, Gianandrea Gavazzeni, and Riccardo Muti. She contributed to the 'Donizetti Renaissance' with her great performances of Donizetti's forgotten operas. Her repertoire consisted of 72 roles, including operas by Monteverdi, Gluck, Mozart, Cherubini, Spontini, Simon Mayr, Puccini, Prokofiev, Britten, Poulenc, Menotti, and Rocca, encompassing lyric, coloratura, and dramatic soprano roles.

Starting in 1982, she dedicated herself to teaching young opera singers. She worked as didactic art director of As.Li.Co. of Milan between 1983–88, and was appointed by Maestro Riccardo Muti to run La Scala's School for Young Artists in 1997-1998. As artistic director of the academy for opera artists in Teatro alla Scala, she specialized in teaching operatic interpretation. In 1996, she appeared in Jan Schmidt-Garre's film Opera Fanatic.

== Death ==
Gencer died on 10 May 2008, aged 79, in Milan. Following her funeral service in San Babila Church and subsequent cremation in Milan, her ashes were brought to Istanbul and scattered in the waters of the Bosphorus on May 16, by famous musician Fazıl Say, according to her wish.

Ten years after her death, in 2018, the Istanbul Foundation for Culture and Arts commemorated Leyla Gencer with the 9th edition of the Leyla Gencer Voice Competition and an exhibition titled Primadonna and Solitude.

In 2019, IKSV commissioned a film, Leyla Gencer: La Diva Turca, written by Zeynep Oral, which was screened at the Grimeborn Festival at the Arcola Theatre.

== Discography ==
- Bellini: Norma/1966, de Fabritiis, Gencer, Cossotto, et al.
- Bellini: Norma/1965, Gavazzeni, Gencer, Simionato, et al.
- Bellini: Beatrice di Tenda 1964/Gui, Gencer, Zanasi, et al.
- Bellini: I Puritani 1961/Quadri, Gencer, Raimondi, et al.
- Pacini: Saffo 1967/Gencer, Del Bianco, Mattiucci
- Cherubini: Medea 1968/ Gencer, Bottion, et al.
- Mayr: Medea in Corinto 1976/Ferro, Gencer, Johns
- Gluck: Alceste 1967/ Gui, Gencer, Picchi
- Chopin: Polish Songs; Liszt/Leyla Gencer, Nikita Magaloff
- Donizetti: Anna Bolena 1958/ Gavazzeni, Gencer, Simionato, et al.
- Donizetti: Anna Bolena 1965/Gavazzeni, Gencer, Cava, et al.
- Donizetti: Caterina Cornaro 1972/Cillario, Gencer, Aragall
- Donizetti: Les Martyrs/1975 Camozzo, Gencer, Bruson, et al.
- Donizetti: Les Martyrs/1978 Gelmetti, Gencer, Bruson, et al.
- Donizetti: Lucrezia Borgia/1970 Gracis, Gencer, Raimondi et al.
- Donizetti: Lucrezia Borgia/1966 Franci, Gencer, Aragall, Petri et al.
- Donizetti: Maria Stuarda/1967 Molinari-Pradelli, Gencer, Verrett, Tagliavini et al.
- Donizetti: Messa di Requiem/Gavazzeni, Teatro La Fenice
- Donizetti: Roberto Devereux 1964/Gencer, Cappuccilli, et al.
- Donizetti: Belisario 1969/Gavazzeni, Gencer, Taddei et al.
- Mozart: Don Giovanni 1960/Molinari-Pradelli, Gencer, Petri, Bruscantini, Stich-Randall et al.
- Mozart: Don Giovanni 1962/Solti, Gencer, Jurinac, Freni
- Ponchielli: La Gioconda 1971 / de Fabritiis, Gencer, Raimondi
- Poulenc: Dialogues Des Carmélites 1957/ Nino Sanzogno conductor, Gencer, Virginia Zeani, Gianna Pederzini, et al. (premiere in Italian translation)
- Zandonai: Francesca da Rimini 1961 / Capuana, Gencer, Cioni, et al.
- Rossini: Elisabetta, Regina d'Inghilterra 1971/Sanzogno, Gencer, Grilli
- Verdi: I due Foscari 1957/Serafin, Gencer, Guelfi
- Verdi: La Battaglia di Legnano 1959/ Gencer, Limarilli
- Verdi: Rigoletto 1961/Quadri, Gencer, MacNeil, Raimondi
- Verdi: Gerusalemme 1963/Gavazzeni, Gencer, Aragall, Guelfi
- Verdi: I Vespri Siciliani 1965/Gavazzeni, Gencer, et al.
- Verdi: Macbeth 1960/Gui, Gencer, Taddei, Picchi et al.
- Verdi: Macbeth 1968/Gavazzeni, Gencer, Guelfi, Corradi, et al.
- Verdi: Attila 1972/Silipigni, Gencer, Hines
- Verdi: Ernani 1972/Gavazzeni, Gencer, Bergonzi
- Verdi: Simon Boccanegra 1961/ Gavazzeni, Gobbi, Gencer
- Verdi: Il Trovatore 1957/Previtali, Gencer, Del Monaco, Barbieri, Bastianini
- Verdi: Un ballo in maschera 1961/Gencer, Bergonzi
- Verdi: Aida 1966/ Capuana, Gencer, Bergonzi, Cossotto
- Verdi: La Forza del Destino 1957/Serafin, Gencer, Di Stefano
- Verdi: La Forza del Destino 1965/Molinari Pradelli, Gencer, Bergonzi
- Spontini: La Vestale 1969/Previtali, Gencer, Merolla, Bruson

== See also ==
- Turkish State Opera and Ballet
