= Mario Lanfranchi =

Italian film director (1927–2022)

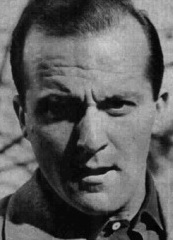
- Lanfranchi in 1968
- Born: 30 June 1927; Parma, Italy
- Died: 3 January 2022 (aged 94); Langhirano, Italy
- Occupations: Film and theatre director, screenwriter and television producer
- Years active: 1952–2021
- Known for: La traviata (1968); Death Sentence (1968)
- Spouse: Anna Moffo (1957–1974 div.)

Mario Lanfranchi (30 June 1927 – 3 January 2022) was an Italian film, theatre, and television director, screenwriter, producer, collector, and actor.

== Career ==
Lanfranchi was born in Parma. After receiving a degree at the Drama Academy (Accademia dei Filodrammatici) of Milan in the early 1950s, he was hired by Sergio Pugliese at RAI, at the onset of Italian television. He was the first to bring opera to the small screen, in 1956, with Madama Butterfly, by Giacomo Puccini, which introduced to a wide public Anna Moffo, at that time an unknown American soprano, who became his wife for 17 years. In 1967 he began his career as a film director with the western movie Death Sentence. He lived in a 16th-century villa in Santa Maria del Piano outside Parma (Villa Lanfranchi).

Lanfranchi died in Langhirano, near Parma, on 3 January 2022, at the age of 94.

== Opera TV productions and films ==
- 1956 – Madama Butterfly – Anna Moffo, Renato Cioni, Miti Truccato Pace, Afro Poli
- 1956 – La fanciulla del West – Gigliola Frazzoni, Ken Neate, Mario Petri
- 1956 – La sonnambula – Anna Moffo, Danilo Vega, Plinio Clabassi
- 1958 – Turandot – Lucille Udovich, Franco Corelli, Renata Mattioli, Plinio Clabassi
- 1959 – Lucia di Lammermoor – Anna Moffo, Nicola Filacuridi, Dino Dondi, Ferruccio Mazzoli
- 1960 – Tosca – Magda Olivero, Alvinio Misciano, Giulio Fioravanti
- 1962 – La serva padrona – Anna Moffo, Paolo Montarsolo
- 1968 – La traviata – Anna Moffo, Franco Bonisolli, Gino Bechi (film)
- 1971 – Lucia di Lammermoor – Anna Moffo, Lajos Kozma, Giulio Fioravanti, Paolo Washington (film)

== Other interests ==
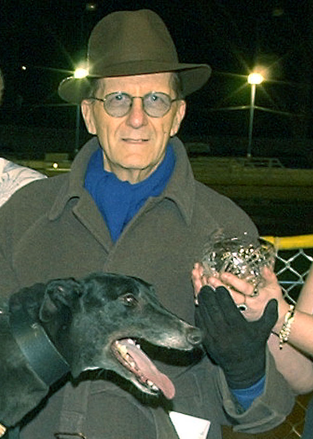
Mario Lanfranchi with one of his greyhounds El Tara in 2003

Lanfranchi was a well-known owner of greyhounds, owning the prefix 'El'. He owned several significant greyhounds including the UK open race win record holder El Tenor.
