= Fedra (Pizzetti) =

Opera by Ildebrando Pizzetti

- Opera by Ildebrando Pizzetti
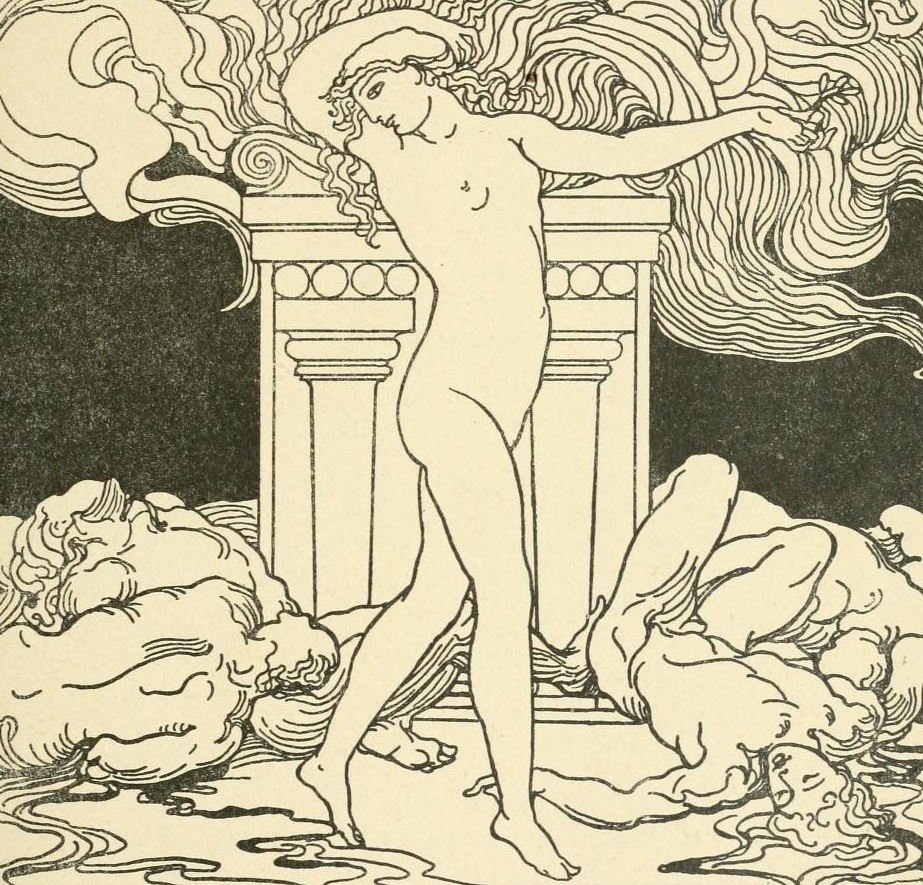
- Fedra in an illustration for Gabriele D'Annunzio's play on which the opera is based
- Librettist: Ildebrando Pizzetti
- Language: Italian
- Premiere: 20 March 1915; La Scala, Milan

Fedra is an opera in three acts composed by Ildebrando Pizzetti to an Italian-language libretto which he abridged from the text of Gabriele D'Annunzio's 1909 tragedy of the same name. The play and the opera recount the story of the Greek mythological figure Phaedra and her unrequited love for her stepson Hippolytus. It premiered on 20 March 1915 at La Scala in Milan conducted by Gino Marinuzzi.

In 1923 the dancer and actress Ida Rubinstein performed Phaedre with set designs by Léon Bakst. The production is usually described as a French translation of the play by D'Annunzio, but press reports mention that Pizzetti's music was used.

== Roles ==
| Role | Voice type | Premiere cast, 20 March 1915 Conductor: Gino Marinuzzi |
|---|---|---|
| Fedra (Phaedra), wife of Teseo | soprano | Salomea Krusceniski |
| Ippolito (Hippolytus), Teseo's son | tenor | Edoardo Di Giovanni |
| Teseo (Theseus) | baritone | Edmondo Grandini |

== Synopsis ==
The Prelude opens with an extended melody for violas, reflecting Fedra’s passionate desire for Ippolito.

Fedra conceives an insane irresistible passion for her stepson, Ippolito, born of a previous relationship of her husband with the queen of Amazons.

She tries to kiss Ippolito when he's sleeping. Ippolito is awakened by the kiss and they have a fight. He rejects her love for him and makes it very clear to her that he is not interested. Fedra is distraught by the passion of love, but at the same time, is furious at having been rejected by him. She conceives a feeling of hatred so strong as to make her want revenge.

Teseo arrives at the palace just in time to see the son flee, without answering his father who had called him repeatedly. Fedra claimed Ippolito had raped her. Teseo, at first, thinks that his wife's accusation against his son may be a lie, but when Fedra provides him with the proof, Teseo, who is blinded by anger, invokes Poseidon to have Ippolito die on that same day.

Ippolito loses his life that very day near the sea as a result of an accident. He fell from his horse and his head hit against a rock. When Teseo finds out the truth of the accusation, he throws himself against Fedra, announcing her death among cruel torments.

== Recordings ==
Régine Crespin as Fedra in 1959 in Milan

| Year | Cast: Fedra, Ippolito, Teseo | Conductor, Opera house, orchestra | Label |
|---|---|---|---|
| 2005 | Mercedes Fortunati, Aldo Bertocci, Anselmo Colzani | Nino Sanzogno, RAI Symphony Orchestra and Chorus, Milan | Opera D'Oro; SN: OPD-1421 (2 discs) |
| 1959 | Regine Crespin, Gastone Limarilli, Dino Dondi | Gianandrea Gavazzeni, Milan | OperaDepot.com; SN: O 11119-2 (1 disc) |
