= Vasco Campagnano =

Italian opera singer

Vasco Campagnano in Andrea Chénier, Teatro Regio, Parma, 1949

Vasco Campagnano (1910–1976) was an Italian operatic tenor, particularly associated with the Italian repertory.

Born in Egypt, to Italian parents, Campagnano studied first with Olga Righi-Mieli in Alexandria, and appeared there in concert. He came to Italy in 1926 to further his studies with Mario Sammarco and Elvino Ventura. He made his debut as a baritone in 1929, as Marcello in Bologna. He sang in small theatres in Italy throughout the 1930s, until the war interrupted his career. After the war, he studied further with Luigi Bolis, and resumed his career but as a tenor, making his debut in Pavia, as Pinkerton, in 1946.

His career took off in 1948, when he made his debut at La Scala in Milan, as Calaf in Turandot. He was invited at the Teatro Nacional Sao Carlos in Lisbon, and the Liceu in Barcelona, also making guest appearances in Zurich, Nice, Tunis, etc. In 1957, he sang Don José at the Verona Arena, and Radames at the Chorégies d'Orange, which was also his farewell role in Tel Aviv in 1959.

He made a few recordings with the Italian radio (RAI) and later released by Cetra, notably; Manon Lescaut, opposite Clara Petrella, La fanciulla del west, opposite Carla Gavazzi, and Aroldo, opposite Maria Vitale.

Vasco Campagnano died in Milan on 16 January 1976.

== Sources ==
- Operissimo.com
