= Dialogues of the Carmelites =

1956 opera by Francis Poulenc

Dialogues des Carmélites
- Opera by Francis Poulenc
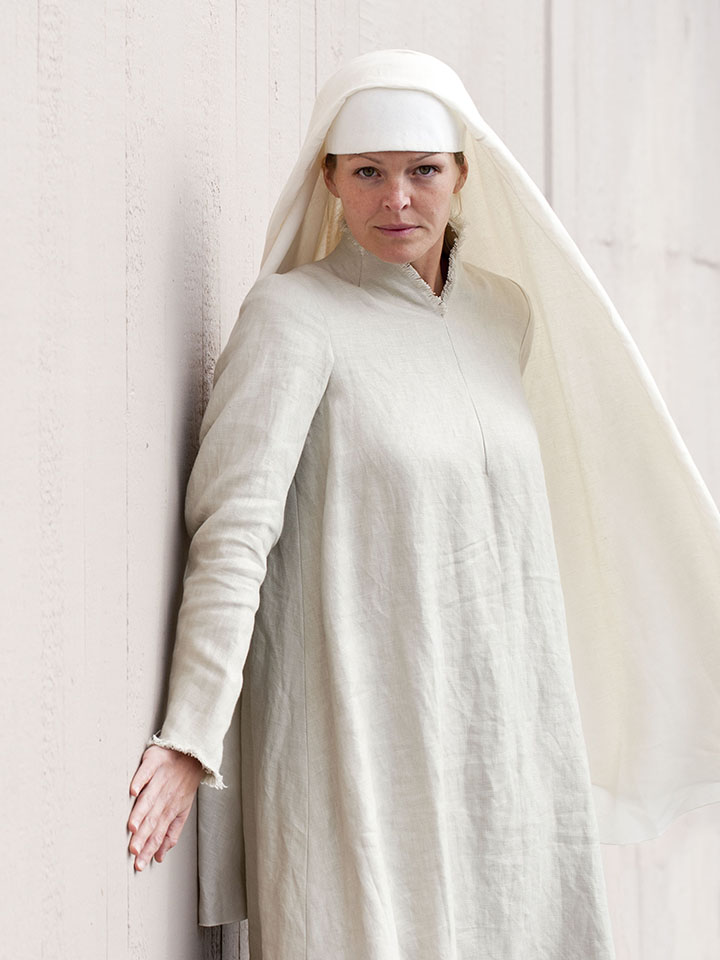
- Elin Rombo as Sister Blanche in a 2011 production at the Royal Swedish Opera
- Translation: Dialogues of the Carmelites
- Librettist: Poulenc
- Language: French
- Based on: Dialogues des Carmélites by Georges Bernanos
- Premiere: 26 January 1957; La Scala, Milan (in Italian)

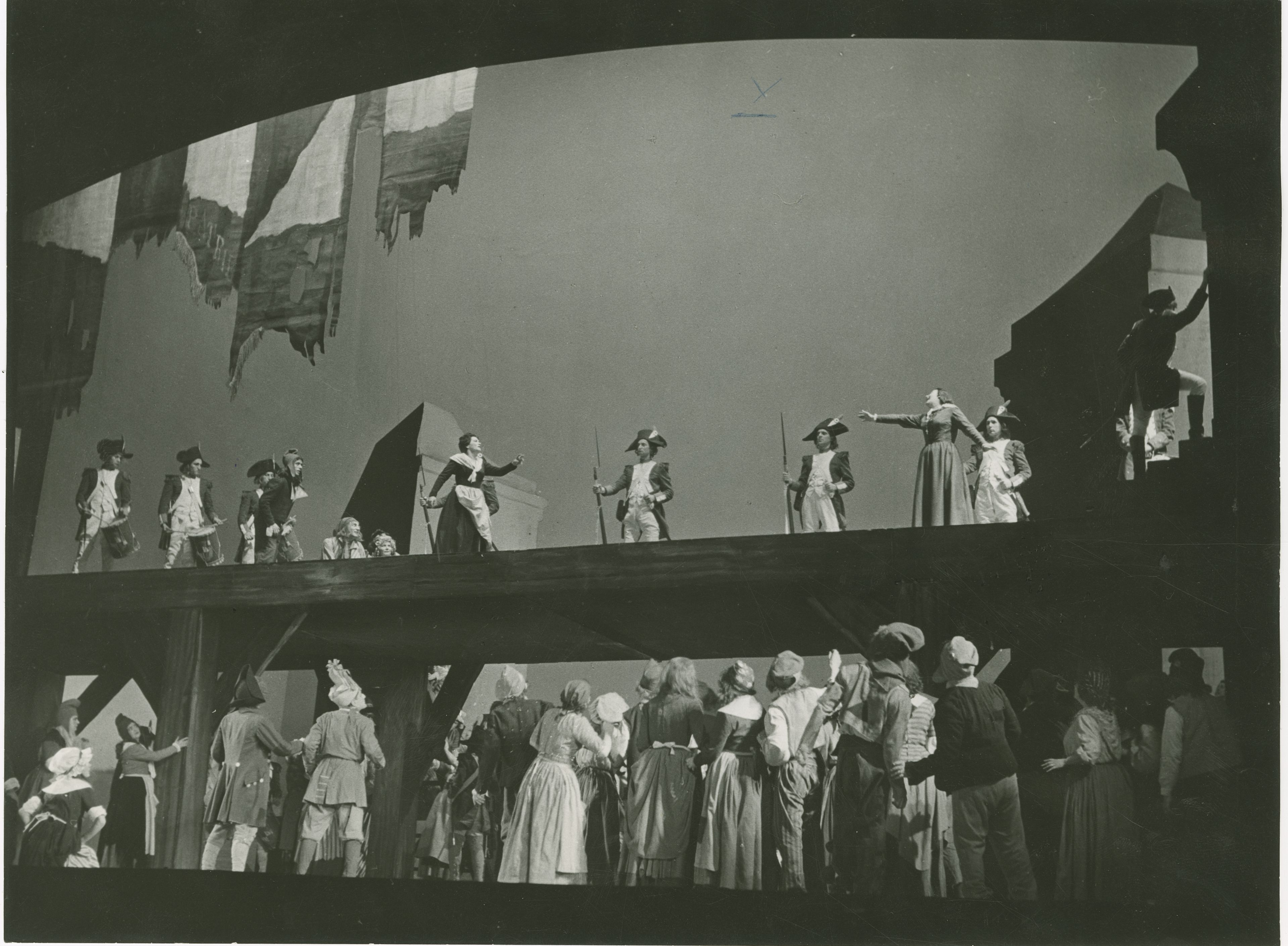
Final scene of the first La Scala production, 1956-57

Dialogues des Carmélites (French pronunciation: [djalɔɡ de kaʁmelit], Dialogues of the Carmelites), FP 159, is an opera in three acts, divided into twelve scenes with linking orchestral interludes, with music and libretto by Francis Poulenc, completed in 1956. Poulenc wrote the libretto for his second opera after the work of the same name by Georges Bernanos, itself based on The Song at the Scaffold by Gertrud von Le Fort. This is a fictionalized version of the story of the Martyrs of Compiègne, Carmelite nuns who, in 1794 during the closing days of the Reign of Terror during the French Revolution, were guillotined in Paris for refusing to renounce their vocation.

The world première of the opera occurred (in Italian translation) on 26 January 1957 at La Scala in Milan. The première of the French-language version took place in Paris on 21 June 1957. The United States première, in English, followed in San Francisco in September 1957.

== Development ==
Bernanos had been hired in 1947 to write the dialogue for a film screenplay, through Raymond Léopold Bruckberger and the scenario writer Philippe Agostini, based on the novella Die Letzte am Schafott (literal translation, The Last on the Scaffold, or Song at the Scaffold, the published title of the English translation) by Gertrud von Le Fort. The novella is based on the story of the Martyrs of Compiègne at the monastery of Carmelite nuns in Compiègne, northern France, in the wake of the French Revolution, specifically in 1794 at the time of state seizure of the monastery's assets. It traces a fictional path from 1789 up to these events, when nuns of the Carmelite Order were guillotined.

The screenplay was judged unsatisfactory for a film. Bernanos died on 5 July 1948. Subsequently, his literary executor, Albert Béguin, found this manuscript. To assist Bernanos' surviving family, Béguin sought to have the work published, and requested permission from von Le Fort for publication. In January 1949, she agreed, and donated her portion of the royalties due to her, as creator of the original story, over to Bernanos' widow and children. However, von Le Fort requested that the Bernanos work be titled differently from her own novella. Béguin chose Dialogues des Carmélites as the title for the Bernanos work, which was published in 1949. A German translation of the work, Die begnadete Angst (The Blessed Fear), was published in 1951, and Zurich and Munich saw productions of Die begnadete Angst that year. The French stage premiere was by Jacques Hébertot in May 1952 at the Théâtre Hébertot.

The genesis of the opera was in 1953. Margarita Wallmann took her husband Guido Valcarenghi, president of Ricordi, which was Poulenc's publishing firm, to see the Bernanos play in Vienna. She had asked Poulenc to write an oratorio for her; through the commission from Ricordi, he developed the work as the opera. Wallman was the eventual producer of the La Scala première of Poulenc's opera, and she later supervised the 1983 revival at Covent Garden. About the same time, Valcarenghi had approached Poulenc with a commission for a ballet for La Scala in Milan.

Separately, Poulenc had seen the Bernanos play, but the suggestion from Ricordi finalised the impetus to adapt the subject as an opera. Poulenc began to adapt the Bernanos text in the spring and summer of 1953, and to compose the music in August 1953. In October 1953, Poulenc learned of a literary rights dispute between Béguin and the American writer Emmet Lavery, who had previously secured all rights to theatrical adaptations of von Le Fort's novel from her in April–May 1949. This was independent of the discussion, concluded in January 1949, between Béguin and von Le Fort. The two-year literary rights dispute between Béguin and Lavery reached arbitration by a jury from La Societé des Auteurs in Paris. On 20 July 1954, this jury ruled unanimously for Lavery, and ordered the Bernanos heirs to pay Lavery 100,000 FF for past contract infringements. In addition, the ruling required the Bernanos heirs to pay Lavery, with respect to all future productions of Dialogues des Carmélites, 15% of the royalties from English-language productions, and 10% from productions in all other languages.

Poulenc had curtailed work on his opera in March 1954, in light of his understanding of the Béguin-Lavery dispute. Following the July 1954 decision, separate negotiations occurred between Béguin and Lavery, via his agent Marie Schebeko, on rights and royalties to allow Poulenc to write his opera. The formal agreement was dated 30 March 1955, and acknowledged Bernanos, Lavery, von Le Fort, Bruckberger, and Agostini. The terms stipulated that the Poulenc opera was adapted from Bernanos 'with the authorization of Monsieur Emmet Lavery', with Lavery listed in the credits after Bernanos and before von Le Fort, without any contribution of material by Lavery to the libretto. Poulenc then resumed work on the opera, and completed it October 1955.

At this time, Poulenc had recommitted himself to spirituality and Roman Catholicism, although he was openly gay and the church officially opposed homosexuality. Opera critic Alan Rich believes that Poulenc's concern for the travails of post-World War II France, as it tried to reconcile issues related to the Holocaust, German occupation and the Resistance, was a subtext within the opera. Wallmann worked closely with Poulenc during the composition process and in evolving the structure, as well as later when she re-staged the production in other theatres. The libretto is unusually deep in its psychological study of the contrasting characters of Mother Marie de l'Incarnation and Blanche de la Force.

Rodney Milnes describes Bernanos' text as "concise and clear" and that like "all good librettos it suggests far more than it states".

== Analysis ==
Poulenc set his libretto largely in recitative. His own religious devotions are particularly evident in the setting of the Qui Lazarum resuscitasti in Act II, Scene I, the Ave Maria in Act II, Scene II, and the Ave verum corpus in Act II, Scene IV. During the final tableau of the opera, which takes place in the Place de la Nation, the distinct sound of the guillotine's descending blade is heard repeatedly over the orchestra and the singing of the nuns of the Salve Regina, who are taken one by one, until only Soeur Constance and Blanche de la Force remain.

Poulenc acknowledged his debt to Mussorgsky, Monteverdi, Verdi, and Debussy in his dedication of the opera, with the casual remark:

"You must forgive my Carmelites. It seems they can only sing tonal music."

Music critic Anthony Tommasini has commented on the opera:

"Poulenc's subtle and intricate tonal language is by turns hymnal and haunting. Though scored for a large orchestra, the instruments are often used in smaller groups selected for particular effects and colorings. The most distinctive element of the score, though, is its wonderfully natural vocal writing, which captures the rhythms and lyrical flow of the libretto in eloquent music that hardly calls attention to itself yet lingers with you."

Opera historian Charles Osborne wrote:

"The inexorable dramatic movement of the work is impressive and, in the final scene in which the nuns walk in procession to the guillotine chanting the Salve regina, extremely moving. Poulenc also found an easy and effective style with which to carry forward without monotony the scenes of convent life."

Philip Hensher has commented on the unique place of this opera in its depiction of convent life:

"...unlike every other opera about nuns, it finds space for a serious discussion about religion and the workings of divine grace that is never saccharine or merely consolatory: how hard it is to be good, how unsure the rewards of virtue."

== Performance history ==
Poulenc expressed a general wish that the opera be performed in the vernacular of the local audience. Thus the opera was first performed in an Italian translation at La Scala on 26 January 1957, with Romanian soprano Virginia Zeani in the role of Blanche. The original French version premiered on 21 June that year by the Théâtre National de l'Opéra de Paris (the current Opéra National de Paris), where Poulenc had chosen the Paris cast, which included Denise Duval (Blanche de la Force), Régine Crespin (Madame Lidoine), Rita Gorr (Mother Marie), and Liliane Berton (Sister Constance).

The United States premiere took place three months later, on 20 September, in English, at San Francisco Opera, which featured the professional opera stage debut of Leontyne Price (as Madame Lidoine). The opera was first presented in New York City on 3 March 1966, in a staging by New York City Opera. The Metropolitan Opera first staged the opera in 1977, in a production by John Dexter, sung in the English translation of Joseph Machlis. The 1980 revival of this production utilised the original French text. Subsequent performances, until 2013, were generally sung in the English translation. From 2013 revivals of this production used the original French text, with the 2019 series included as part of the Live in HD cinema series for that season.

The opera is among a comparatively small number of post-Puccini works that have never lost their place in the international repertory.

== Roles ==
Role	Voice type	World première (sung in Italian) World première cast 26 January 1957 (Milan) (conductor: Nino Sanzogno)	Première of original French version French première cast 21 June 1957 (Paris) (conductor: Pierre Dervaux)
Marquis de la Force	baritone	Scipio Colombo	Xavier Depraz
Chevalier de la Force, his son	tenor	Nicola Filacuridi	Jean Giraudeau
Blanche de la Force/Sister Blanche of the Agony of Christ, his daughter	soprano	Virginia Zeani	Denise Duval
Thierry, a footman	baritone	Armando Manelli	Michel Forel
Madame de Croissy, the prioress of the monastery	contralto	Gianna Pederzini	Denise Scharley
Sister Constance of St. Denis, a young novice	soprano	Eugenia Ratti	Liliane Berton
Mother Marie of the Incarnation, sub-prioress	mezzo-soprano	Gigliola Frazzoni	Rita Gorr
M. Javelinot, a doctor	baritone	Carlo Gasperini	Max Conti
Madame Lidoine/Mother Marie of St. Augustine, the new prioress	soprano	Leyla Gencer	Régine Crespin
Mother Jeanne of the Holy Child Jesus, the oldest nun	contralto	Vittoria Palombini	Janine Fourrier
Sister Mathilde	mezzo-soprano	Fiorenza Cossotto	Gisèle Desmoutiers
Chaplain of the monastery	tenor	Alvino Manelli	Michel Forel
First commissioner	tenor	Antonio Pirino	Raphaël Romagnoni
Second commissioner	baritone	Arturo La Porta	Charles Paul
Officer	baritone	Michele Cazzato	Jacques Mars
Jailer	baritone		
Carmelites, officers, prisoners, townspeople

== Synopsis ==
Place: Paris and Compiègne, 1789–94
Time: during the French Revolution

=== Act 1 ===
The opera opens with Marquis and Chevalier de la Force talking about the general unrest in France and their worries about Blanche, at a time when crowds stop carriages in the street and aristocrats are attacked. The pathologically timid Blanche de la Force decides to retreat from the world and enter a Carmelite convent. The Mother Superior informs her that the Carmelite Order is not a refuge; it is the duty of the nuns to guard the Order, not the other way around. In the convent, the chatterbox Sister Constance tells Blanche (to her consternation) that she has had a dream that the two of them will die young together. The prioress, who is dying, commits Blanche to the care of Mother Marie. The Mother Superior passes away in great agony, shouting in her delirium that despite her long years of service to God, He has abandoned her. Blanche and Mother Marie, who witness her death, are shaken.

=== Act 2 ===
Sister Constance remarks to Blanche that the prioress' death seemed unworthy of her, and speculates that she had been given the wrong death, and that perhaps someone else will find death surprisingly easy.

Blanche's brother, the Chevalier de la Force, arrives to announce that their father thinks Blanche should withdraw from the convent, since she is not safe there (being both an aristocrat and the member of a religious community, at a time of anti-aristocracy and anti-clericalism in the rising revolutionary tides). Blanche refuses, saying that she has found happiness in the Carmelite Order. Later she admits to Mother Marie that it is fear (or the fear of fear itself, as the Chevalier expresses it) that keeps her from leaving.

The chaplain announces that he has been forbidden to preach (presumably for being a non-juror under the Civil Constitution of the Clergy). The nuns remark on how fear rules the country, and no one has the courage to stand up for the priests. Sister Constance asks, "Are there no men left to come to the aid of the country?" "When priests are lacking, martyrs are superabundant," replies the new Mother Superior. Mother Marie says that the Carmelites can save France by giving their lives, but the Mother Superior corrects her: it is not permitted to choose to become a martyr; God decides who will be martyred.

A police officer arrives and announces to the community that the Legislative Assembly has nationalized the convent and its property, and the nuns must give up their religious habits. When Mother Marie acquiesces, the officer taunts her for being eager to dress like everyone else. She replies that the nuns will continue to serve, no matter how they are dressed. "The people have no need of servants," proclaims the officer haughtily. "No, but they have a great need for martyrs," responds Mother Marie. "In times like these, death is nothing," he says. "Life is nothing," she answers, "when it is so debased."

=== Act 3 ===
In the absence of the new prioress, Mother Marie proposes that the nuns take a vow of martyrdom. However, all must agree, or Mother Marie will not insist. A secret vote is held; there is one dissenting voice. Sister Constance declares that she was the dissenter, and that she has changed her mind, so the vow can proceed. Blanche runs away from the convent, and Mother Marie goes to look for her, finding her in her father's library. Her father has been guillotined, and Blanche has been forced to serve her former servants.

The nuns are all arrested and condemned to death, but Mother Marie is away at the time of the arrest. Upon receiving the news, the chaplain tells Mother Marie, when they meet again, that since God has chosen to spare her, she cannot voluntarily become a martyr by joining the others in prison.

At the place of execution, one nun after another stands and slowly processes toward the guillotine, as all sing the "Salve Regina" ("Hail, Holy Queen"). At the last moment, Blanche appears, to Constance's joy, to join her condemned sisters. Having seen all the other nuns executed, as she mounts the scaffold, Blanche sings the final stanza of the "Veni Creator Spiritus," "Deo Patri sit gloria...", the Catholic hymn traditionally used when taking vows in a religious community and offering one's life to God.

== Recordings ==
Audio

- Denise Duval, Régine Crespin, Denise Scharley, Liliane Berton, Rita Gorr, Xavier Depraz, Paul Finel, Michel Forel, Louis Rialland, Janine Fourrier, Gisele Desmoutiers, et al.; Orchestra and Chorus of the Opéra National de Paris; Pierre Dervaux, conductor (HMV/EMI/Warner Classics)
- Catherine Dubosc, Michel Sénéchal, François le Roux, Rita Gorr, José van Dam, Rachel Yakar, Martine Dupuy, et al.; Orchestra and Chorus of the Opéra de Lyon; Kent Nagano, conductor (Virgin Classics)
- Catrin Wyn-Davies, Ashley Holland, Peter Wedd, Gary Coward, Felicity Palmer, Josephine Barstow, Orla Boylan, Sarah Tynan, Jane Powell, Anne Marie Gibbons, Ryland Davies, William Berger, James Edwards, Roland Wood, Toby Stafford-Allen, David Stephenson; Orchestra and Chorus of English National Opera; Paul Daniel, conductor (Chandos, titled The Carmelites, sung in English)
- Sally Matthews, Deborah Polaski, Heidi Brunner, Michelle Breedt, Hendricke van Kerckhove, Yann Beuron, Magdalena Anna Hoffmann, Christa Ratzenböck, Jürgen Sacher, et al.; Vienna Radio Symphony Orchestra and Arnold Schoenberg Choir; Bertrand de Billy, conductor (Oehms Classics)
- Leyla Gencer, Virginia Zeani, Gianna Pederzini, Gigliola Frazzoni, Scipio Colombo, Nicola Filacuridi, Eugenia Ratti, Vittoria Palombini, et al.; Orchestra and Chorus of the Teatro alla Scala di Milano; Nino Sanzogno, conductor (1957 world premiere recording in Italian translation) (Cantus CACD 5.01066 F (2CDs)

Video

- Isobel Buchanan, Heather Begg, Joan Sutherland, Lone Koppel, Anne-Marie McDonald, Richard Greager, Paul Ferris, Geoffrey Chard, et al.; Chorus and Orchestra of Opera Australia; Richard Bonynge, conductor; Elijah Moshinsky, director (Kultur, 1984, sung in English)
- Maria Ewing, Jessye Norman, Betsy Norden, Régine Crespin, and Florence Quivar; Manuel Rosenthal, conductor; John Dexter, director; Metropolitan Opera (1987)
- Anne-Sophie Schmidt, Patricia Petibon, Nadine Denize, Laurence Dale, et al.; Chorus of the Opera National du Rhin and the Orchestre Philharmonique de Strasbourg; Jan Latham-Koenig, conductor; Marthe Keller, director (Arthaus, 1998)
- Dagmar Schellenberger, Anja Silja, Barbara Dever, Laura Aikin, Gwynne Geyer, Gordon Gietz, Christopher Robertson, Mario Bolognesi, et al., Chorus and Orchestra of La Scala, Milan; Riccardo Muti, conductor; Robert Carsen, director (TDK, 2007)
- Alexia Voulgaridou, Kathryn Harries, Anne Schwanewilms, Gabriele Schnaut, Jana Büchner, Nikolai Schlkoff, Wolfgang Schöne, et al.; Hamburg Philharmonic and Chorus of the Hamburg State Opera; Simone Young, conductor; Nikolaus Lehnhoff, director (Arthaus, 2010)
- Susan Gritton, Sylvie Brunet, Soile Isokoski, Susanne Resmark, Hélène Guilmette, Bernard Richter, Alain Vernhes, et al., Bavarians State Orchestra and Chorus; Kent Nagano, conductor; Dmitri Tcherniakov, director (Bel Air Classiques, 2011)
- Véronique Gens, Sophie Koch, Sandrine Piau, Patricia Petibon, Rosalind Plowright, Topi Lehtipuu, et al.; Philharmonia Orchestra and Chorus of the Théâtre des Champs-Élysées; Jérémie Rhorer, conductor; Olivier Py, director (Erato, 2014)
