= Denise Scharley =

French opera singer

Denise Scharley as Dalila (Paris, 1960)

Denise Scharley (born Neuilly-en-Thelle, 15 February 1917 – died Versailles, 26 July 2011) was a French contralto who made her debut in 1942, singing Pelléas et Mélisande at the Opéra-Comique.

Long associated with French opera, she starred as Madame de Croissy in the Paris première of Poulenc's Dialogues of the Carmelites. She was also associated with the female lead roles of Carmen and Samson and Delilah.

== Recording ==
- Francis Poulenc: Dialogues of the Carmelites (Denise Duval, Denise Scharley, Régine Crespin, Liliane Berton, Rita Gorr, and others; National Theater of the Paris Opera orchestra and chorus; Pierre Dervaux, conductor) EMI 62768
