= Assassinio nella cattedrale =

1958 opera by Ildebrando Pizzetti

- Opera by Ildebrando Pizzetti
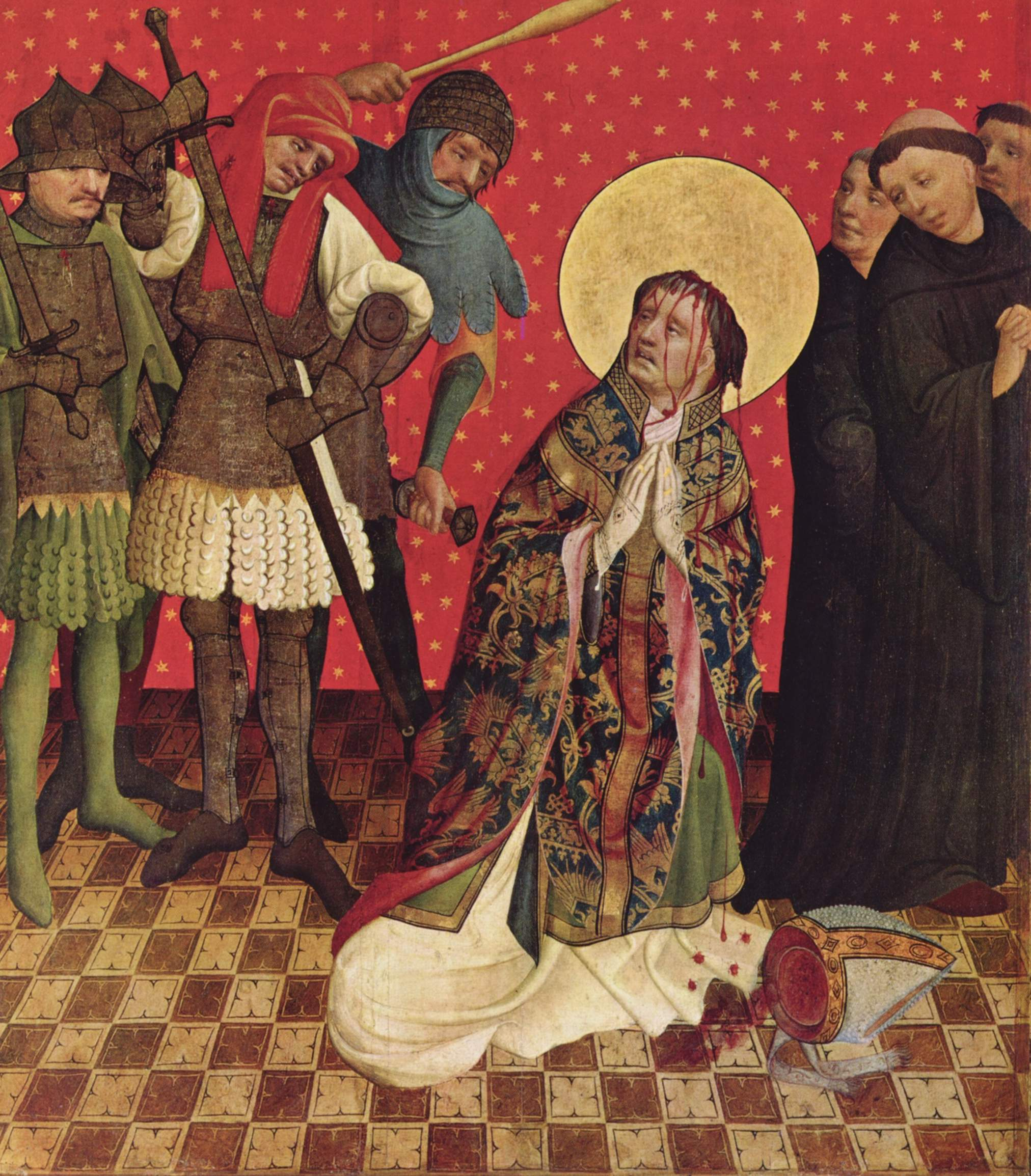
- The assassination of Thomas Becket in Canterbury Cathedral, the opera's central theme, in a 15th-century depiction by Francke
- Librettist: Ildebrando Pizzetti
- Language: Italian
- Based on: Murder in the Cathedral by T. S. Eliot
- Premiere: 1 March 1958; Teatro alla Scala, Milan, Italy

Assassinio nella cattedrale (Murder in the Cathedral) is an opera in two acts and an intermezzo by the Italian composer Ildebrando Pizzetti, who also wrote the libretto. He adapted it from an Italian translation of T. S. Eliot's 1935 play Murder in the Cathedral. The opera was premiered at La Scala, Milan, on 1 March 1958. The opera was performed for the first time in Canada the following year at the Montreal Festivals.

== Roles ==
Roles, voice types, premiere cast
Role	Voice type	Premiere cast, 1 March 1958 Conductor: Gianandrea Gavazzeni
Thomas Becket	bass	Nicola Rossi-Lemeni
Herald	tenor	Aldo Bertocci
First tempter	tenor	Rinaldo Pelizzoni
Second tempter	bass	Antonio Cassinelli
Third tempter	bass	Nicola Zaccaria
Fourth tempter	bass	Lino Puglisi
First priest	tenor	Mario Ortica
Second priest	baritone	Dino Dondi
Third priest	bass	Adolfo Cormanni
First knight	tenor	Rinaldo Pelizzoni
Second knight	bass	Enrico Campi
Third knight	bass	Silvio Maionica
Fourth knight	bass	Marco Stefanoni
First coryphée	soprano	Leyla Gencer
Second coryphée	mezzo-soprano	Gabriella Carturan

== Recordings ==
- Assassinio nella cattedrale – La Scala Orchestra and Chorus conducted by Gianandrea Gavazzeni with Nicola Rossi-Lemeni as Thomas Becket. Recorded live at the La Scala premiere, 1 March 1958. Label: Opera d'Oro
- Assassinio nella cattedrale – Orchestra Sinfonica Nazionale della RAI di Torino conducted by Ildebrando Pizzetti with Nicola Rossi-Lemeni as Thomas Becket. Radio broadcast recorded live in Turin, 5 December 1958. Label: Stradivarius
- Assassinio nella cattedrale — Vienna State Opera Orchestra and Chorus conducted by Herbert von Karajan with Hans Hotter as Thomas Becket. Recorded live at the Vienna State Opera, 9 March 1960. Sung in German. Label: Deutsche Grammophon
- Assassinio nella cattedrale – Orchestra Sinfonica della Provincia di Bari conducted by Piergiorgio Morandi with Ruggero Raimondi as Thomas Becket. Recorded live at the Basilica di San Nicola, Bari on 22 December 2006. Label: Decca
