= Betsy Norden =

American soprano (born 1945)

Betsy Norden (born October 17, 1945) is an American soprano who appeared with the Metropolitan Opera over 500 times.

Born in Cincinnati, Ohio, she studied at Boston University, and began her career in musical comedy. Norden joined the Met chorus in 1969, and sang her first solo role there on January 27, 1972, as the Peasant Girl in Le nozze di Figaro, opposite Cesare Siepi in the name part, with Karl Böhm conducting. The lyric soprano went on to sing thirty-nine different roles at the Met, including Despina in Cosi fan tutte, Zerlina in Don Giovanni, Oscar in Un ballo in maschera, Musetta in La bohème, Liu in Turandot, Sophie in Werther, Gretel in Hänsel und Gretel, and Constance in Dialogues des Carmélites, as well as numerous secondary roles.

On December 27, 1975, she sang four different roles on the same day (possibly a Met record) during the matinee and evening performances of Hänsel und Gretel and Il trittico.

Norden was seen in several of the Met's telecasts, including Don Carlos (conducted by James Levine), Lulu (directed by John Dexter), Il trittico (with Renata Scotto), Rigoletto, Hänsel und Gretel, Don Carlos again (with Plácido Domingo and Mirella Freni), and Dialogues des Carmélites (as Sister Constance of St Dénis, possibly her most successful role).

Her final appearances at the Metropolitan were in the 1992 world-premiere production of The Ghosts of Versailles (with Teresa Stratas and Marilyn Horne), the televised performance of which was her last Met appearance.

Norden has also appeared with various American opera companies, including those of Philadelphia and San Francisco. She has appeared as concert soloist with various ensembles including the St. Louis Symphony Orchestra, the Minnesota Orchestra, the Milwaukee Symphony Orchestra, Mostly Mozart Festival Orchestra, and the New York Chorale Society.

In 1977, she recorded Arthur Shepherd's Triptych, for High Voice and String Quartet with the Emerson String Quartet for New World Records. In 1987, she recorded an album of "Cantatas & Arias," with trumpeter Bob Haley, for Crystal Records.

Norden married Bob Haley on December 10, 1972, and has two sons.

== Videography ==
- Verdi: Don Carlos [as Thibault] (Scotto, Troyanos, Moldoveanu, Milnes, Plishka, Hines; Levine, Dexter, 1980) [live]
- Berg: Lulu [as the Girl] (Migenes, Lear, Riegel, Mazura; Levine, Dexter, 1980) [live]
- Puccini: Il trittico [as Sister Genovieffa & Nella] (Scotto; Levine, Melano, 1981) [live]
- Verdi: Rigoletto [as the Contessa di Ceprano] (Éda-Pierre, Pavarotti, L.Quilico; Levine, Dexter, 1981) [live]
- Humperdinck: Hänsel und Gretel [as the Dew Fairy] (Blegen, von Stade, Devlin; Fulton, Merrill/Donnell, 1982) [live]
- Verdi: Don Carlos [as Thibault] (Freni, Bumbry, Domingo, L.Quilico; Levine, Dexter, 1983) [live]
- Corigliano: The Ghosts of Versailles (Stratas, Horne, Hagegård, G.Quilico; Levine, Graham, 1992) [live]
