= La fanciulla del West =

Opera by Giacomo Puccini

- Opera by Giacomo Puccini
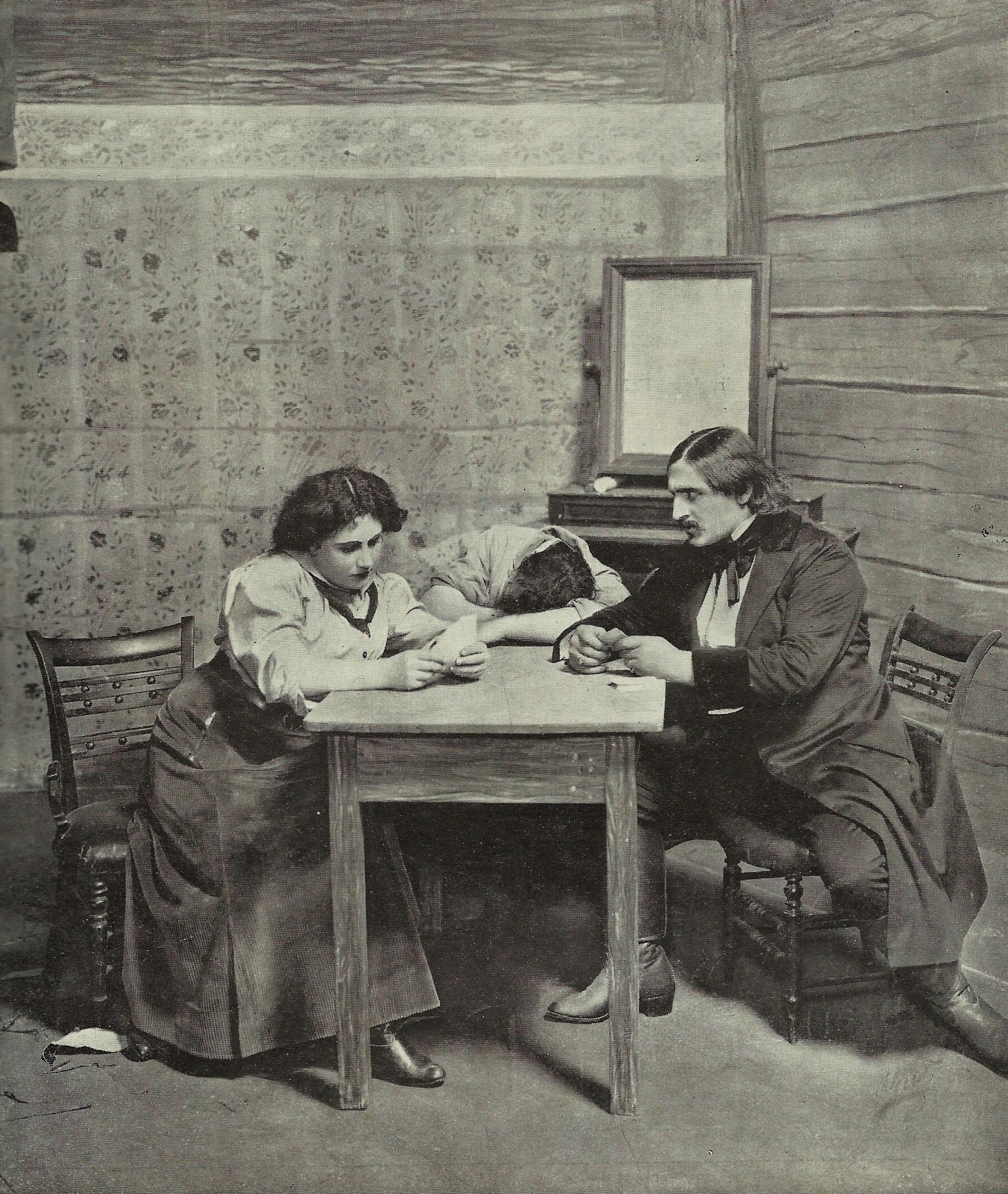
- "Una partita a poker" – a crucial scene in the opera; Emmy Destinn in the title role in the première and Pasquale Amato as Sheriff Jack Rance.
- Translation: The Girl of the West
- Librettist: Guelfo Civinini; Carlo Zangarini
- Language: Italian
- Based on: David Belasco's play The Girl of the Golden West
- Premiere: December 10, 1910; Metropolitan Opera, New York City, New York, U. S.

La fanciulla del West (The Damsel of the West) is an opera in three acts by Giacomo Puccini to an Italian libretto by Guelfo Civinini and Carlo Zangarini, based on the 1905 play The Girl of the Golden West by the American author David Belasco. Fanciulla followed Madama Butterfly, which was also based on a Belasco play. The opera has fewer of the show-stopping highlights that characterize Puccini's other works, but is admired for its impressive orchestration and for a score that is more melodically integrated than is typical of his previous work. Fanciulla displays influences from composers Claude Debussy and Richard Strauss, without being in any way imitative. Similarities between the libretto and the work of Richard Wagner have also been found though some attribute this more to the original plot of the play, and have asserted that the opera remains quintessentially Italian.

At its première, Puccini declared La fanciulla del West to be the greatest composition of his career as a composer. In 1910, its highly publicised first performance at the Metropolitan Opera in New York City was immensely popular with audiences. However, much to the composer's disappointment, it received a less than positive reaction from American critics who felt the composer failed to effectively integrate an American aesthetic into the opera's score. The opera was widely performed internationally in the three years following the premiere for performances in cities throughout the United States, Europe, and South America. However, critical reaction to the work was largely negative internationally with the exception of critics in Italy at this time in history.

After 1913, stagings of La fanciulla del West during the early and mid-20th century were more infrequent; although the opera has never left the performance repertoire. While overall public reception of the work has remained mixed, critical assessment of the opera underwent a reversal among Puccini scholars beginning in the late 20th century. Despite the plot being a source of significant criticism, the majority of published writers on Puccini and his music in the late 20th century and 21st century deem La fanciulla del West Puccini's magnum opus, particularly lauding its craftsmanship.

Its critical reassessment coincided with an increase of performances of the opera at opera houses internationally during the late 20th and 21st centuries. Today performances of the opera are not rare, but the work is still not as frequently programmed as Puccini's other mature operas, such as La bohème and Tosca.

In 2006, American philanthropist Bruce Kovner donated a large collection of original manuscripts to the Juilliard School in New York City, including Puccini's manuscript for La fanciulla del West.

== Early performance history and critical assessment ==
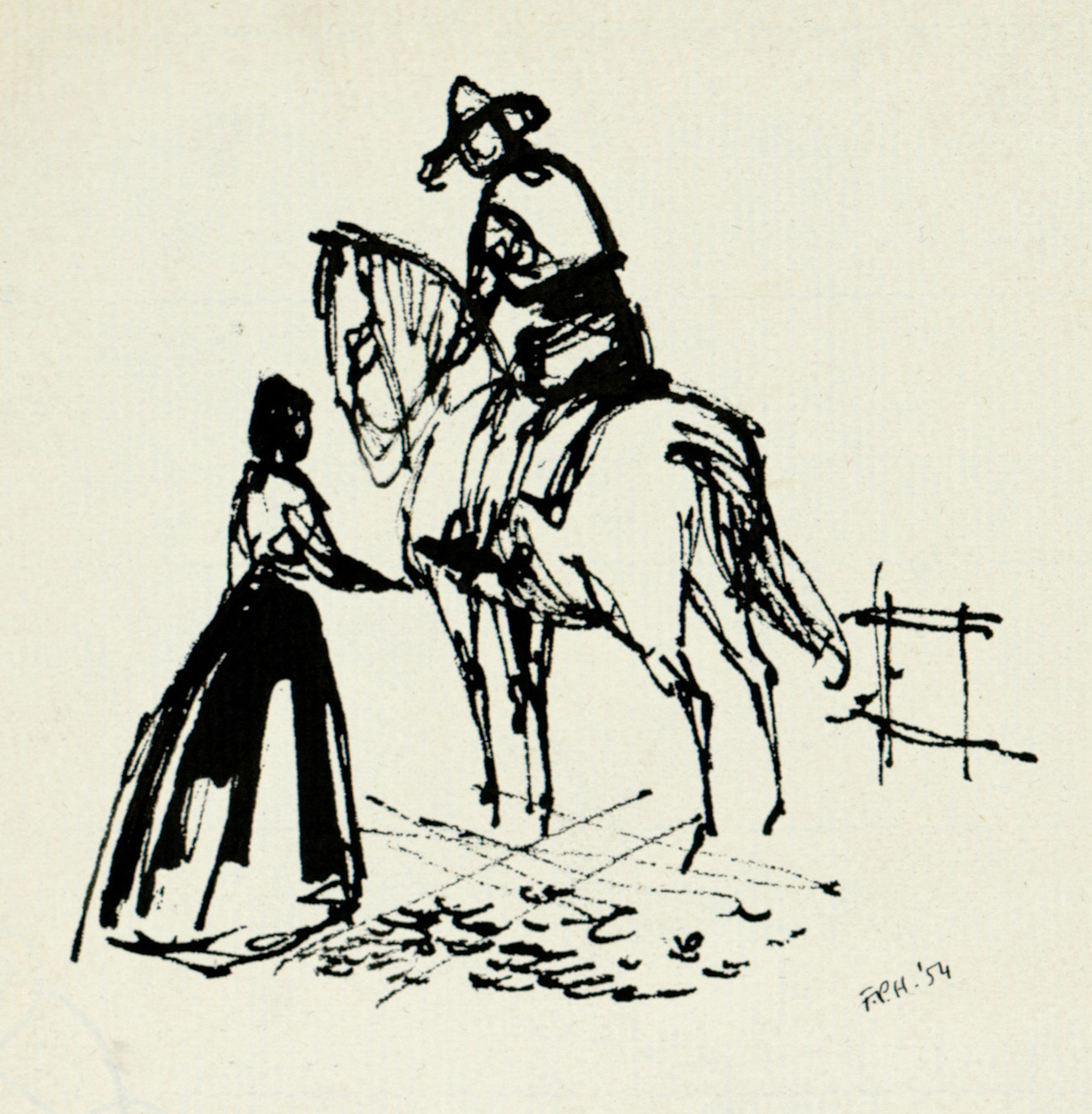
Cover design for libretto (1954)

La fanciulla del West was premièred on 10 December 1910 at the Metropolitan Opera in New York City, which commissioned the work. Puccini created the leading roles of Dick Johnson and Minnie for Enrico Caruso and Emmy Destinn, the company's two leading singers. Also in the cast was Pasquale Amato as Jack Rance. The Met's music director Arturo Toscanini, who called the opera a " great symphonic poem", conducted. This was the first world première of an opera at the Met, and was extremely well-received by audiences in this initial production. At the première, the composer received fourteen curtain calls after the first act, nineteen curtain calls after the second act, and twenty after the finale.

Puccini himself was incredibly thrilled with the work and both he and his publisher, Ricordi, assumed that the opera's enthusiastic response from New York audiences would translate into another popular success on the international stage. In some respects this was initially the case, as the opera enjoyed a large number of stagings in the two years after its premiere with many performances in major American cities, over twenty productions in German opera houses, and performances in theaters in London, Liverpool, Buenos Aires, Naples, Milan, Rome, and Budapest. Critical reaction to the opera, however, never matched Puccini's own favorable view of his opera, and the work struggled to a find a place in the regularly performed opera repertoire after this initial flurry of performances.

American critics were lukewarm in their reception, largely criticizing the work for failing to successfully incorporate American idioms into its musical score. In analyzing the disparity between audience response and American critical reaction, musicologist Kathryn Fenton asserts that American critics were trying to wrestle with their conceptions of American identity stating,

Marked by ambivalence, the reviews expose the New York City critics' struggle to reconcile the opera they expected to see with the one they actually saw. Their view of the opera's place in Puccini's repertoire and in the early 20th-century opera canon differed—in some cases drastically—with the composer's own assessment. One of the strongest objections made concerned its local color, its attempt to portray a Californian mining camp during the 1849 Gold Rush through characters, dialect, body language, clothing, buildings, landscape, customs, situation, and—most importantly—music considered stereotypical of the region. Critics found the manner in which Puccini attempted to musically depict the American locale problematic.

Immediately following its première, La fanciulla del West was programed by several American opera companies. The American Carolina White, who had previously established herself as a leading soprano in opera houses in Italy and Switzerland, made her United States opera debut as Minnie in the Chicago première of the opera on December 27, 1910, at the Chicago Auditorium by the Chicago Grand Opera Company. White performed the role again for the opera's first stagings in Milwaukee (1910) and Boston (1911), the latter with the Boston Opera Company. Henry Wilson Savage staged the opera's first English-language production for its Connecticut premiere at the Poll's Theater in Bridgeport on October 27, 1911, with Luisa Villani as Minnie.

While American critics were lukewarm in their reviews of La fanciulla del West, English critics were even more harsh in their initial assessment of the opera. The work was poorly reviewed when the Royal Opera House, Covent Garden, staged the European and British première of the work on May 29, 1911 under the baton of Cleofonte Campanini with the same cast as the Met première with the exception of Amedeo Bassi in the role of Johnson. Italian critics, however, were more positive in their assessment of the opera during its Italian première Teatro Costanzi in Rome on June 12, 1911. This performance was attended by King Victor Emmanuel III of Italy and Queen Elena of Montenegro who reportedly warmly received the opera. However, while praised by both Italian critics and the monarchy, the opera did not achieve popularity with the public and failed to gain a place among the regularly programmed local operatic repertoire.

Puccini himself conducted La fanciulla del West for its first performance in Lucca at the Teatro del Giglio in 1911. The theater's orchestra pit was redesigned by Puccini and rebuilt just prior to the performance. It was first staged at La Scala on December 12, 1912, with Tina Poli Randaccio as Minnie and Tullio Serafin conducting where it ran thirteen performances.

The German première of La fanciulla del West, as in the United States, enjoyed positive audience responses, but received negatively by critics when staged at the Deutsches Opernhaus in Berlin (now known as the Deutsche Oper) on March 28, 1913, under the direction of Ignatz Waghalter. Other premières took place at the Teatro Colón in Buenos Aires on July 25, 1911; and in Melbourne on June 11, 1912 at Her Majesty's Theatre. The French world première in French took place in the Opéra de Monte-Carlo on April 12, 1912 in an adaptation by Maurice Vaucaire. The Zimin Opera presented the work's Russian première on October 2, 1913, at the Solodovnikov Theatre in Moscow.

In spite of criticism, Puccini insisted that La fanciulla del West was his greatest composition up to that point in his career. Yet the opera struggled to find a place in the standard opera repertory in the 20th century, even in the United States, enjoying only periodic performances. Critical reaction and public reception of the work has been divided, and the opera has never achieved the popularity enjoyed by many of Puccini's other operas. Only late in the 20th century was the opera re-assessed as a work of quality, and Puccini scholars have acknowledged that the opera was an important departure in Puccini's body of work from a predominant quality of feminine softness in his other works towards a decidedly masculine aesthetic. Likewise, the complexity of the opera's harmonic language and its use of a wide range of instrumental colour has led some writers on music to label it as Puccini's greatest opera.

La fanciulla del West has fewer of the show-stopping highlights that characterize Puccini's other works, but is admired for its impressive orchestration and for a score that is more melodically integrated than is typical of his previous work. The work displays influences from composers Claude Debussy and Richard Strauss, without being in any way imitative. Similarities between the libretto and the work of Richard Wagner have also been found, though some attribute this more to the original plot of the play, and have asserted that the opera remains quintessentially Italian.

Yet, some critics of the opera, particularly in America, have deemed the opera as conceived "silly"; largely in relation to its American storyline being told through the vehicle of an Italian opera. For example, music critic Robert Levine stated the following in his review of a 2004 production at the Glimmerglass Opera: “The entire concept of an Italian opera taking place during the California Gold Rush of the 1850s is a mite silly.” Smith College musicology professor Ruth A. Solie has written about the hypocrisy of such criticisms, noting that Americans often have no trouble accepting Italian operas set in foreign locales like Egypt (Aida) and China (Turandot). In analyzing this general reaction among American reviews, Annie J. Randall observed in her book Puccini and the Girl: History and Reception of “The Girl of the Golden West (2005, University of Chicago Press) that European operas often feature the "exotic" and suggests that American critics have professed “annoyance that Americans had been made the object of the voyeuristic imperial gaze on the opera stage.”

Despite the plot being a source of significant criticism, the majority of academics and musicians today agree in calling it a magnum opus, particularly lauding its musical craftsmanship.

== Later performance history ==
While La fanciulla del West has failed to match the popularity of some of Puccini's other works, such as La bohème, Tosca and Madama Butterfly, the work has never completely left the opera repertoire. For periodic stretches of time in the 20th century, performances of the opera occurred with less frequency, but the opera has had a resurge of interest internationally in the late 20th and early 21st centuries. Although Fanciulla is not performed as often as Puccini's other mature operas,it is still produced semi-regularly.

In 1921, the opera was staged at the Opéra de Monte-Carlo where Puccini was particularly impressed by soprano Gilda dalla Rizza, remarking, "At last I have seen my true Fanciulla." In 1922, the Chicago Civic Opera staged the opera with Rosa Raisa as Minnie; a production which the company toured to New York's Manhattan Opera House. In 1927 the Vienna State Opera staged the work with a critically lauded performance by Maria Jeritza in the role of Minnie; with the soprano receiving fourteen curtain calls in her final performance of the production. In 1934 the opera was given its Swedish premiere in Stockholm at the Royal Swedish Opera with Jussi Björling as Dick Johnson and Helga Görlin as Minnie.

The Metropolitan Opera has revived La fanciulla del West several times during the company's history after the initial production of the opera left its repertoire in 1914. The first time was in 1929 with Jeritza as Minnie and Giovanni Martinelli as Dick Johnson; a production which remained in the Met's performance repertoire through 1931. In 1930, the opera was presented for the first time for a national studio broadcast with New Zealand soprano Frances Alda singing the role of Minnie.

After a 30-year absence, La fanciulla del West was revived again at the Met in 1961 with a production directed by Henry Butler with an initial cast of Leontyne Price as Minnie and Richard Tucker as Dick Johnson. Butler's staging of the work remained in the Met's performance repertoire for periodic performances over the next nine years; with its final performances being in 1970 with soprano Renata Tebaldi as Minnie. The work as staged by Butler was notably the very first opera performance presented at the newly built Metropolitan Opera House at Lincoln Center on April 11, 1966, with soprano Beverly Bower in the role of Minnie. More recently the Met revived the opera in 1991 with Barbara Daniels as Minnie; using a staging by Giancarlo del Monaco which has remained in the Met's rotating repertoire for periodic performance; most recently in 2018 with Eva-Maria Westbroek as Minnie. The Met also presented this staging of the work in the 2010–2011 season with Deborah Voigt as Minnie to mark the 100th anniversary of the opera's premiere in 1910.

The San Francisco Opera (SFO) staged the work for the first time on September 15, 1930, with Jeritza as Minnie, Frederick Jagel as Dick Johnson, and Gaetano Viviani as Jack Rance. The company has since presented the opera in five more of its opera seasons, including productions in 1943 with Florence Kirk as Minnie and Robert Weede as Jack Rance; in 1960 with Dorothy Kirsten as Minnie and Sandor Konya as Dick Johnson; in 1965 with Chester Ludgin as Jack Rance and Marie Collier as Minnie using a production staged by Lotfi Mansouri; in 1979 with Carol Neblett as Minnie and Giovanni Gibin as Dick Johnson; and in 2010 with Deborah Voigt as Minnie.

In 1949, the Festival Puccini in Torre del Lago, Italy staged a new production of La fanciulla del West to commemorate the 25th anniversary of Puccini's death; and the opera has remained a part of the festival's rotating repertoire into the 21st century. In 1950 the Teatro dell'Opera di Roma mounted the opera in a production starring Maria Caniglia as Minnie and Vasco Campagnano as Johnson. In 1954 soprano Eleanor Steber portrayed Minnie at a production at La Fenice. La Scala staged the opera in 1956 with tenor Franco Corelli as Johnson; a role he repeated at the Teatro di San Carlo in 1957. The opera remained in La Scala's repertoire for several seasons with the role of Minnie being performed at the theatre by sopranos Gigliola Frazzoni (1956–1957) and Birgit Nilsson (1958). In 1958 soprano Anny Schlemm performed the role of Minnie at the Oper Frankfurt, and soprano Gerda Scheyrer sang the part at the Vienna State Opera.

In 1963, the opera was staged by the Fujiwara Opera in Tokyo with Antonietta Stella as Minnie. The Theatro Municipal (Rio de Janeiro) mounted the work in 1964 with Magda Olivero as Minnie; a role the soprano repeated at the Teatro Lirico Giuseppe Verdi in 1965. The Philadelphia Lyric Opera staged the work at the Academy of Music in 1964 under the music direction of Anton Guadagno.

The New York City Opera (NYCO) first presented the opera in 1977 in a production directed by Frank Corsaro with Maralin Niska as Minnie and Ermanno Mauro as Dick Johnson with Sergiu Comissiona conducting. The NYCO unveiled a new production of the opera staged by James De Blasis in 1990 starring Linda Roark-Strummer as Minnie and Stefano Algieri as Dick Johnson. The NYCO staged the opera a third time in 2005 with Stephanie Friede as Minnie, Renzo Zulian as Dick Johnson, and George Manahan conducting. Most recently the NYCO presented the opera in 2017 with Kristin Sampson as Minnie.

In 1979, the Teatro Colón performed La fanciulla del West with Plácido Domingo as Dick Johnson. In 1982 the Deutsche Oper Berlin staged the opera with Ghena Dimitrova as Minnie. That same year the Royal Opera House, Covent Garden mounted a production of the opera starring Domingo and Carol Neblett which was filmed for television broadcast in the UK and the United States. In 1983 the Canadian Opera Company performed the work with Johanna Meier as Minnie. In 1985 the Spoleto Festival USA performed the opera with Belgian soprano Anne-Marie Antoine as Minnie. In 1991 the Santa Fe Opera presented the work during its 35th season with Mary Jane Johnson as Minnie and Craig Sirianni as Dick Johnson. That same year La Scala revived the opera with Mara Zampieri, Plácido Domingo, and Juan Pons singing under the baton of Lorin Maazel; a performance which was recorded live for commercial release.

An incomplete list of more recent stagings include performances at the Teatro Real (1983), the Liceu (1984), Arena di Verona (1986), Vienna State Opera (1988 and 2013), Lyric Opera of Chicago (1990 and 2011), Welsh National Opera (1991), the Teatro Regio Torino (1991), Tulsa Opera (1991), the Los Angeles Opera (1991 and 2002), Oper Frankfurt (1992), Opéra de Marseille (1993), the Metropolitan Opera House, New York (1993), the Royal Opera House, Covent Garden (1994 and 2005), La Scala (1995), the Zürich Opera House (1998 and 2014), the Teatro del Giglio (2000), the Austin Lyric Opera (2002), Seattle Opera (2004), Glimmerglass Opera (2004), the Opera Orchestra of New York (2004), the Deutsche Oper Berlin (2006, 2015, and 2021), the New National Theatre Tokyo (2006), the Melbourne Symphony Orchestra (2007), the Malmö Opera (2007), the Opéra de Montréal (2008), the Teatro dell'Opera di Roma (2008–2009), the Dutch National Opera (2009), the Adelaide Festival Theatre (2009), the Edinburgh International Festival (2010), Opera Australia (2010), the Mobile Opera (2013), the Castleton Festival (2013), the Minnesota Opera (2014) the Paris Opera (2014), Opera Holland Park (2014), the English National Opera (2014), Opera North (2014), the Virginia Opera (2017), the Michigan Opera Theatre (2017), the Hungarian State Opera (2018), the Bavarian State Opera (2019), the National Centre for the Performing Arts (China) (2019, Chinese premiere), the Mariinsky Theatre (2019 and 2022), the Berlin State Opera (2021), the Seoul Arts Center (2021, South Korea première), the Romanian National Opera, Cluj-Napoca (2022), the Teatro Sociale, Como (2022), the Teatro Fraschini (2022), and the Estonian National Opera (2022–2023).

The opera was first portrayed in film in 1915 by famed director Cecil B. DeMille, and subsequently by directors Edwin Carewe in 1923, and John Francis Dillon, whose 1930 film was lost. A 1938 film directed by Robert Z. Leonard was based not on the opera but on the original play by Belasco; Sigmund Romberg wrote songs for this film.

== Roles ==
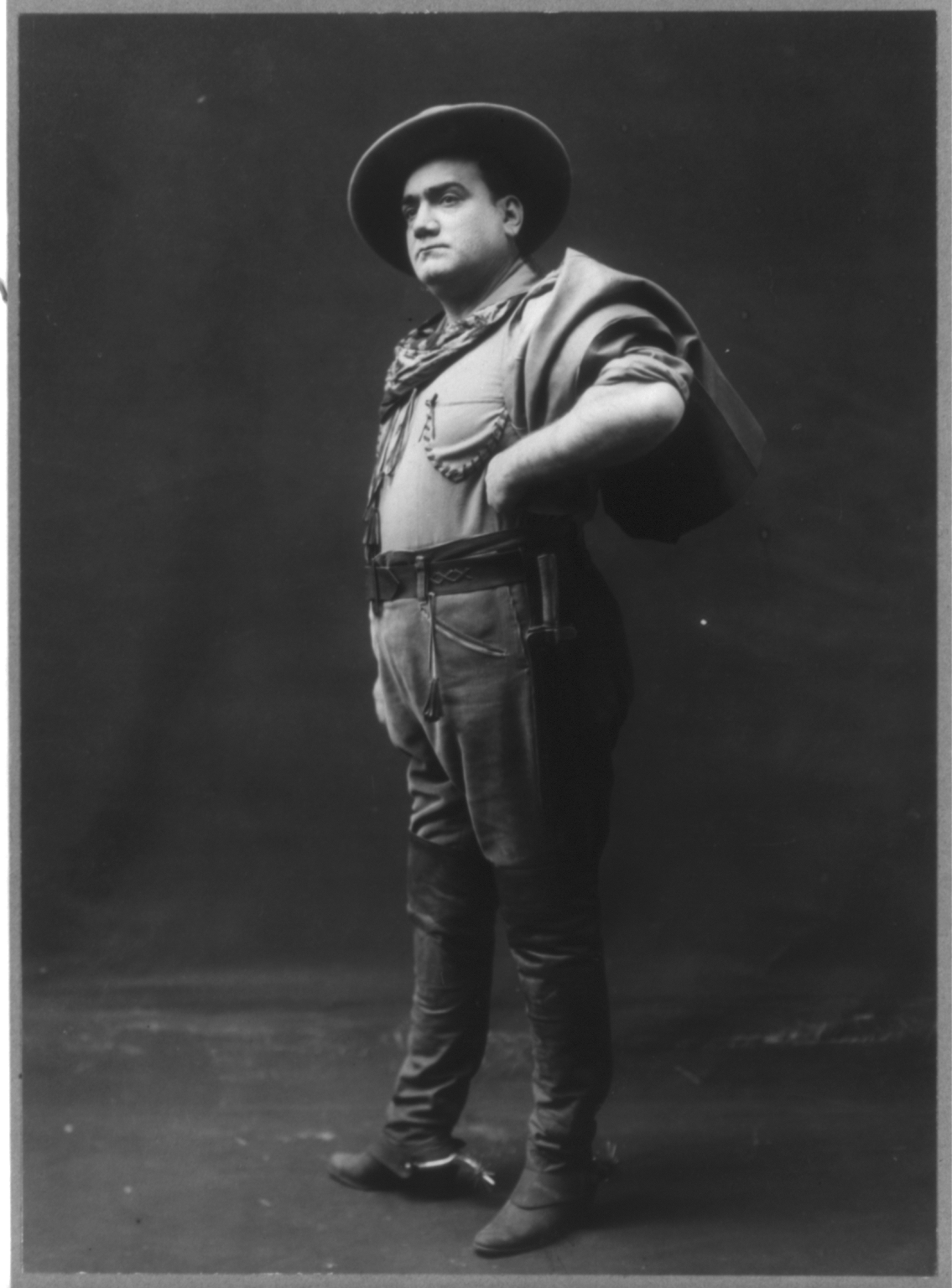
Enrico Caruso as Dick Johnson

Roles, voice types, premiere cast
Role	Voice type	Premiere cast, 10 December 1910 Conductor: Arturo Toscanini
Minnie	soprano	Emmy Destinn
Jack Rance, sheriff	baritone	Pasquale Amato
Dick Johnson alias Ramerrez, bandit	tenor	Enrico Caruso
Nick, bartender at the Polka saloon	tenor	Albert Reiss
Ashby, Wells Fargo agent	bass	Adamo Didur
Sonora, miner	baritone	Dinh Gilly
Trin, miner	tenor	Angelo Badà
Sid, miner	baritone	Giulio Rossi
Bello, (Note: This is not the character's real name; it is merely a sobriquet owing to his physical attractiveness. Bello is often named "Handsome" (its literal translation) in productions in Anglophone nations.) miner	baritone	Vincenzo Reschiglian
Harry, miner	tenor	Pietro Audisio
Joe, miner	tenor	Glenn Hall
Happy, miner	baritone	Antonio Pini-Corsi
Jim Larkens, miner	bass	Bernard Bégué
Billy Jackrabbit, a Red Indian	bass	Georges Bourgeois
Wowkle, his squaw	mezzo-soprano	Marie Mattfeld
Jake Wallace, a traveling camp minstrel	baritone	Andrés de Segurola
José Castro, a mestizo "greaser" from Ramirez' band	bass	Edoardo Missiano
Pony Express rider	tenor	Lamberto Belleri
Men of the camp and boys of the ridge

== Synopsis ==
Time: 1849 to 1850.
Place: A mining camp at the foot of the Cloudy Mountains, California.

=== Act 1 ===
Inside the Polka Saloon

A group of Gold Rush miners enter the "Polka" saloon after a day of mining ("Hello! Hello! Alla 'Polka'"). After a song by traveling minstrel Jake Wallace ("Che faranno i vecchi miei"), one of the miners, Jim Larkens, is homesick and the miners collect enough money for his fare home ("Jim, perché piangi?").

Another group of miners playing cards discover that Sid is cheating and want to attack him. Sheriff Jack Rance quiets the fight and pins two cards to Sid's jacket, as a sign of a cheat.

A Wells Fargo agent, Ashby, enters and announces that he is chasing the bandit Ramerrez and his gang of Mexicans. Rance toasts Minnie, the woman who owns the saloon, as his future wife, which makes Sonora jealous. The two men begin to fight. Rance draws his revolver but at that moment, a shot rings out and Minnie stands next to the bar with a rifle in her hands ("Hello, Minnie!"). She gives the miners a reading lesson from the Bible ("Dove eravamo?").

The Pony Express rider arrives ("La posta!") and delivers a telegram from Nina Micheltorena, offering to reveal Ramerrez's hideout. The sheriff tells Minnie that he loves her, but Minnie puts him off as she is waiting for the right man ("Ti voglio bene, Minnie").

A stranger enters the saloon and asks for a whisky and water. He introduces himself as Dick Johnson from Sacramento, whom Minnie had met earlier. Johnson invites Minnie to dance with him and she accepts. Angrily, Rance watches them.

Ashby returns with the captured Ramerrez gang member, Castro. Upon seeing his leader, Johnson, in the saloon, Castro agrees to lead Rance, Ashby and the miners in a search for Ramerrez, and the group then follows him on a false trail and in what turns out to be a wild goose chase. But before Castro leaves, he whispers to Johnson that somebody will whistle and Johnson must reply to confirm that the place is clear. A whistle is heard, but Johnson fails to reply.

Minnie shows Johnson the keg of gold that she and the miners take turns to guard at night and Johnson reassures her that the gold will be safe there. Before he leaves the saloon, he promises to visit her at her cabin. They confess their love for each other. Minnie begins to cry, and Johnson comforts her before he leaves.

=== Act 2 ===
Minnie's dwelling, later that evening

Minnie's servant Wowkle (a Native American woman), her lover Billy Jackrabbit, and their baby are present as Minnie enters, wanting to get ready for Johnson's visit. Johnson enters Minnie's cabin and she tells him all about her life. It begins to snow. They kiss and Minnie asks him to stay till morning. He denies knowing Nina Micheltorena. As Johnson hides, a posse enters looking for Ramerrez and reveal to Minnie that Johnson is the bandit Ramerrez himself. Angrily, she orders Johnson to leave. After he leaves, Minnie hears a gunshot and she knows Johnson has been shot. When Johnson staggers in and collapses, Minnie repents of her anger and helps him up to the loft to hide. Rance enters Minnie's cabin looking for the bandit and is about to give up searching for Johnson when drops of blood fall on his hand. Rance forces Johnson to climb down. Minnie desperately makes Rance an offer: if she beats him at poker, he must let Johnson go free; if Rance wins, she will marry him. Hiding some cards in her stockings, Minnie cheats and wins. Rance honors the deal and Minnie throws herself on the unconscious Johnson on the floor.

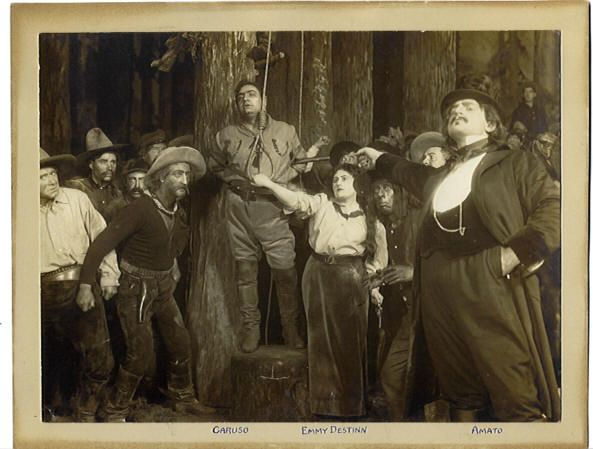
Scene from act 3 of the première, with Enrico Caruso, Emmy Destinn, and Pasquale Amato

=== Act 3 ===
In the Great Californian Forest at dawn, sometime later

Johnson is again on the run from Ashby and the miners. Nick and Rance are discussing Johnson and wonder what Minnie sees in him when Ashby arrives in triumph: Johnson has been captured. Rance and the miners all want Johnson to be hanged. Johnson accepts the sentence and only asks the miners not to tell Minnie about his capture and his fate ("Ch'ella mi creda"). Minnie arrives, armed with a pistol, just before the execution and throws herself in front of Johnson to protect him. While Rance tries to proceed, she convinces the miners that they owe her too much to kill the man she loves, and asks them to forgive him ("Ah! Ah! È Minnie! ... Non vi fu mai chi disse 'Basta!'"). One by one, the miners yield to her plea ("E anche tu lo vorrai, Joe"). Rance is not happy but finally he too gives in. Sonora unties Johnson and sets him free. The miners bid Minnie farewell ("Le tue parole sono di Dio") and Minnie and Johnson leave California to start a new life together.

== Instrumentation ==
La fanciulla del West is scored for piccolo; three flutes; three oboes; one English horn; three clarinets in B-flat; one bass clarinet in B-flat; three bassoons; one contrabassoon; four French horns in F; three trumpets in F; three tenor trombones; one bass trombone; a percussion section with timpani, cymbals, one triangle, one snare drum, one bass drum, and one glockenspiel; three onstage fonicas; (Note: The fonica is an electronic instrument invented by Puccini for La fanciulla del West. Casa Ricordi had a set created and rented them out for early productions of the opera, but the result was unsatisfactory and the instrument's use was ceased shortly after the premiere. A marimba is commonly substituted in modern productions.) one celesta; two harps; and strings.

== Recordings ==
Year	Cast: (Minnie, Dick Johnson, Jack Rance)	Conductor, Opera house and orchestra	Label
1950	Carla Gavazzi, Vasco Campagnano, Ugo Savarese	Arturo Basile, RAI Orchestra and Chorus, Milan	CD: Warner Fonit; Cat: 8573 87488–2
1954	Eleanor Steber, Mario Del Monaco, Giangiacomo Guelfi	Dimitri Mitropoulos, La Maggio Musicale Fiorentino Orchestra and Chorus (Recording of a performance at L’Opera di Firenze, 6 June)	CD: MYTO; Cat: 975.169
1956	Gigliola Frazzoni, Franco Corelli, Tito Gobbi	Antonino Votto, Teatro alla Scala Orchestra and Chorus (Recording of a performance at La Scala, 4 April)	CD: Opera d'Oro; Cat: 7036
1957	Magda Olivero, Giacomo Lauri-Volpi, Giangiacomo Guelfi	Vincenzo Bellezza	
1958	Renata Tebaldi, Mario Del Monaco, Cornell MacNeil	Franco Capuana, Santa Cecilia Academy Orchestra and Chorus	CD: Decca; Cat: 421595
1958	Birgit Nilsson, João Gibin, Andrea Mongelli	Lovro von Matačić, Teatro alla Scala Orchestra and chorus	CD: EMI Classics; Cat: 81862
1961	Renata Tebaldi, Daniele Barioni, Giangiacomo Guelfi	Arturo Basile, Roma Italiana Opera Orchestra e Coro	CD: Opera d'Oro; Cat:1242
1963	Antonietta Stella, Gastone Limarilli, Anselmo Colzani	Oliviero De Fabritiis, NHK Symphony Orchestra Tokyo, Nikikai Chorus, Fujiwara Opera Chorus	DVD: Video Artists Int'l; Cat: 4439
1977	Carol Neblett, Plácido Domingo, Sherrill Milnes	Zubin Mehta, Royal Opera House Orchestra and Chorus	CD:Deutsche Grammophon; Cat: 419640
1982	Carol Neblett, Plácido Domingo, Silvano Carroli	Nello Santi, Royal Opera House Orchestra and Chorus	DVD: Kultur Video; Cat: 032031203891
1991	Éva Marton, Dennis O'Neill, Alain Fondary	Leonard Slatkin, Munich Radio Symphony Orchestra, Bavarian Radio Chorus	CD: RCA Victor Red Seal; Cat: 60597
1991	Mara Zampieri, Plácido Domingo, Juan Pons	Lorin Maazel, Teatro alla Scala Orchestra and chorus	DVD: BBC / Opus Arte; Cat: OA LS3004 D
1992	Barbara Daniels, Plácido Domingo, Sherrill Milnes	Leonard Slatkin, Metropolitan Opera Orchestra and Chorus	DVD: Deutsche Grammophon; Cat: 00440 073 4023
2011	Deborah Voigt, Marcello Giordani, Lucio Gallo	Nicola Luisotti, Metropolitan Opera Orchestra and Chorus	DVD: Deutsche Grammophon; Cat: 80016679-09
2013	Nina Stemme, Jonas Kaufmann, Tomasz Konieczny	Franz Welser-Möst, Wiener Staatsoper Orchestra and Chorus	Blu-ray: Sony Records; Cat: 88875064079

== Other influences ==
The melody for Jake Wallace's song near the beginning of the first act is derived from two songs in a collection of Zuni melodies "recorded and harmonized" by ethnomusicologist Carlos Troyer, published in 1909. Puccini had obtained that publication in an effort to find authentic Native American music for the role of Wowkle, but he ended up using it for Jake Wallace instead. (Several books about Puccini repeat Mosco Carner's erroneous claim that the song is based on Stephen Foster's "Old Dog Tray").

A climactic phrase sung by Johnson, "E provai una gioia strana" (alternatively "Ho provato una gioia strana" in some versions of the libretto) from "Quello che tacete" near the end of the first act, is widely cited to resemble a similar phrase in the Phantom's song "The Music of the Night" in Andrew Lloyd Webber's 1986 musical The Phantom of the Opera. The Puccini estate sued Lloyd Webber over copyright infringement and the matter was settled out of court.
