= Liliane Berton =

French opera singer

Liliane Berton (11 July 1924 - 22 April 2009) was a French soprano, known principally on the opera stage, but also active in radio recordings and as a teacher.

== Career ==
Liliane Berton was born in Bully-les-Mines, Pas-de-Calais on 11 July 1924. In her early life she was a diction contest, and originally intended to pursue a career as a dramatic actress. After vocal studies at the Conservatoire de Lille and the Conservatoire de Paris she made her debut at the Opéra de Marseille as Blonde in Die Entführung aus dem Serail in 1950.

Berton was taken on by the Réunion des théâtres lyriques nationaux (RTLN), and made her Paris debut at the Opéra as Siebel in Faust on 8 September 1952, before appearing in the premiere of Dolorès by Michel-Maurice Lévy at the Opéra-Comique on 7 November 1952.

Her career encompassed many lighter soprano roles in the repertoire: l'Amour, Fatime (Les Indes galantes), Sophie (Werther), Poussette (Manon), Xenia (Boris Godunov), Rosina (The Barber of Seville, in French), Eurydice (Orphée), Sophie (Der Rosenkavalier) and Chérubin and Susanna (The marriage of Figaro).

In 1957 she created the role of Soeur Constance in the French premiere of Dialogues des Carmélites by Francis Poulenc.

As well as Paris, she sang frequently in the French provincial houses, as well as at the Festivals of Aix-en-Provence, Edinburgh, Glyndebourne and the Netherlands, and in Rio de Janeiro, Buenos-Aires, Lisbon and London.

Around 1966 her career moved from performing to teaching, at the Paris Conservatoire, with Gabriel Bacquier, while still occasionally singing lighter repertoire and opérettes.

As well as Dialogue des Carmélites she left recordings of other operas, many operettas and melodies by Poulenc.

She married René Charrière of the singing group « Les garçons de la rue » in 1952. She suffered a stroke in 2005. She died in Paris on 22 April 2009.
