= Death Sentence (1968 film) =

1968 film

- Film poster
- Directed by: Mario Lanfranchi
- Screenplay by: Mario Lanfranchi
- Produced by: Sandro Bolchi; Alberto Puccini
- Starring: Robin Clarke; Richard Conte; Enrico Maria Salerno; Adolfo Celi; Tomas Milian
- Cinematography: Antonio Secchi
- Edited by: Franco Attenni
- Music by: Gianni Ferrio
- Production company: B.L. Vision
- Distributed by: International Film Company
- Release date: 1 January 1968
- Running time: 90 minutes
- Country: Italy
- Language: Italian

Death Sentence (Italian: Sentenza di morte) is a 1968 Spaghetti Western directed by Mario Lanfranchi and starring Richard Conte.

== Plot ==
The rancher Diaz, the gambler Montero, the hypocrite clergyman Baldwin and the mentally distorted rover O'Hara are all former bandits. Cash has unfinished business with this lot and for each single one he conceives a tailored trap which turns their individual preferences against them until they are all put down.

== Cast ==
- Robin Clarke as Cash
- Richard Conte as Diaz
- Enrico Maria Salerno as Montero
- Adolfo Celi as Friar Baldwin
- Tomas Milian as O'Hara, the Albino
- Eleonor Brown
- Lilli Lembo
- Luciano Rossi
- Monica Pardo
- Glauco Scarlini
- Giorgio Gruden
- Umberto Di Grazia
- Dony Baster
- Silvana Bacci
- Raffaele Di Mario
- Claudio Trionfi
