= Eugenia Ratti =

Italian soprano (1933–2020)

- Eugenia Ratti (photo with 1955 dedication)
- Occupation: opera soprano singer

Eugenia Ratti (5 April 1933 – 14 November 2020) was an Italian soprano, particularly associated with the Italian repertory. A lyric coloratura soprano of considerable charm, she excelled in soubrette roles in works by Cimarosa and Mozart such as Susanna, Zerlina, Despina, and in light Donizetti such as Adina, Norina, as well as Verdi's Oscar and Nannetta.

== Life and career ==
Ratti was born in Genoa, Italy. She made her stage debut at Sestri Levante in 1954. In January 1955, she first appeared at the Teatro alla Scala in Milan, in the premiere of Darius Milhaud's David, later singing Lisa in La sonnambula, opposite Maria Callas and Cesare Valletti, in the famous Visconti-Bernstein production. In 1957, she sang Nedda to Franco Corelli's Canio in Pagliacci, and created the role of Sister Constance of St Dénis in Francis Poulenc's Dialogues des Carmélites, alongside Virginia Zeani and Leyla Gencer.

She appeared at the Holland Festival in 1955, as Elvira in L'italiana in Algeri, and in 1956, at the Aix-en-Provence Festival as Rosina in Il barbiere di Siviglia. In 1957, she sang as Elisetta in Il matrimonio segreto, at the Edinburgh Festival. She also made guest appearances at the Paris Opéra, the Munich State Opera, the Vienna State Opera, and the Glyndebourne Festival (as the Italian Singer in Capriccio). In 1965, Ratti appeared in Fedora (as the Countess Olga Sukarev), opposite Magda Olivero and Mario del Monaco, at Naples.

In America, she appeared at the San Francisco Opera, in 1958: Il barbiere di Siviglia, La bohème (as Musetta, opposite Jussi Björling), and Le nozze di Figaro (with Dame Elisabeth Schwarzkopf). The next year, Ratti sang at the Dallas Opera, in Franco Zeffirelli's production of Il barbiere di Siviglia, replacing Callas as Rosina, who was replacing Teresa Berganza.

== Studio discography ==
- Bellini: La sonnambula (Callas, Monti, Zaccaria; Votto, 1957) EMI
- Cimarosa: Il matrimonio segreto (Sciutti, Stignani, Badioli; Sanzogno, 1956) EMI
- Mozart: Don Giovanni (Nilsson, L.Price, Valletti, Siepi; Leinsdorf, 1959) RCA Victor/Decca Records
- Verdi: Aïda [as the High Priestess] (Tebaldi, Simionato, Bergonzi, MacNeil; Karajan, 1959) Decca Records
- Verdi: Un ballo in maschera (Callas, Barbieri, di Stefano, Gobbi; Votto, 1956) EMI
