= Ch'ella mi creda =

Aria from the opera La fanciulla del West by Giacomo Puccini

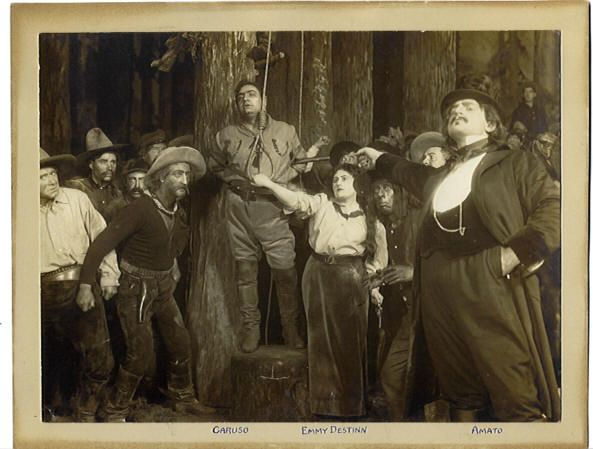
Act 3 of Fanciulla, immediately following the aria "Ch'ella mi creda", with Enrico Caruso, Emmy Destinn, and Pasquale Amato, from the 1910 premiere.

"Ch'ella mi creda" is a tenor aria from act 3 of the opera La fanciulla del West by Giacomo Puccini. It is the tenor aria sung by Dick Johnson (a.k.a. the bandit "Ramerrez") before he is to be executed by a lynch mob of gold prospectors led by Sheriff Jack Rance. In the aria, Johnson asks them not to tell Minnie, whom he loves, that he has been killed. Instead, he asks them to "let her believe" (the title phrase, "ch'ella mi creda") that he is far away, on the road to redemption from his bandit past.

The aria was sung for the first time by Enrico Caruso, at the world premiere of La fanciulla del West at the Metropolitan Opera in New York on 10 December 1910. Unfortunately, Caruso never recorded the aria, nor the opera's other major tenor aria, "Or son sei mesi". At the time, Giulio Ricordi, the publisher, forbade the recording of any excerpts from Fanciulla because he believed recordings would somehow interfere with the sales of vocal scores. It is said that during World War I, Italian soldiers sang "Ch'ella mi creda" to maintain their spirits. The aria is also popular as a piece in concerts and excerpt albums.

At the Metropolitan Opera's 125th anniversary gala on March 15, 2009, Plácido Domingo sang the aria in a recreation of the scene as it had been performed by Caruso at the premiere nearly 100 years earlier. David Belasco's set and the original costumes were recreated for the event. The production designers of the gala told The New York Times that the image of Caruso in La fanciulla del West (see inset) in the act 3 scene in which "Ch'ella mi creda" is sung was the first image from the Met's past that the team set out to recreate for the gala.

== Libretto ==
"Per lei, per lei soltanto .. Ch'ella mi creda"
Performed by the 561st and 562nd United States Air National Guard Bands

Ch'ella mi creda libero e lontano
sopra una nuova via di redenzione!...
Aspetterà ch'io torni...
E passeranno i giorni,
E passeranno i giorni,
ed io, ed io non tornerò...
ed io non tornerò...
Minnie, della mia vita mio solo fiore,
Minnie, che m'hai voluto tanto bene!...
Tanto bene!
Ah, ah! tu della mia vita mio solo fior!

Translation:

Let her believe I'm free and far away
On a new path of redemption!...
She will wait for my return...
And the days will pass,
And the days will pass,
and I, and I will not return.
and I will not return.
Minnie, the only flower of my life,
Minnie, who loved me so much!...
So much!
Ah, Ah! you're the only flower of my life!
