= Guelfo Civinini =

Italian poet, writer and journalist (1873–1954)

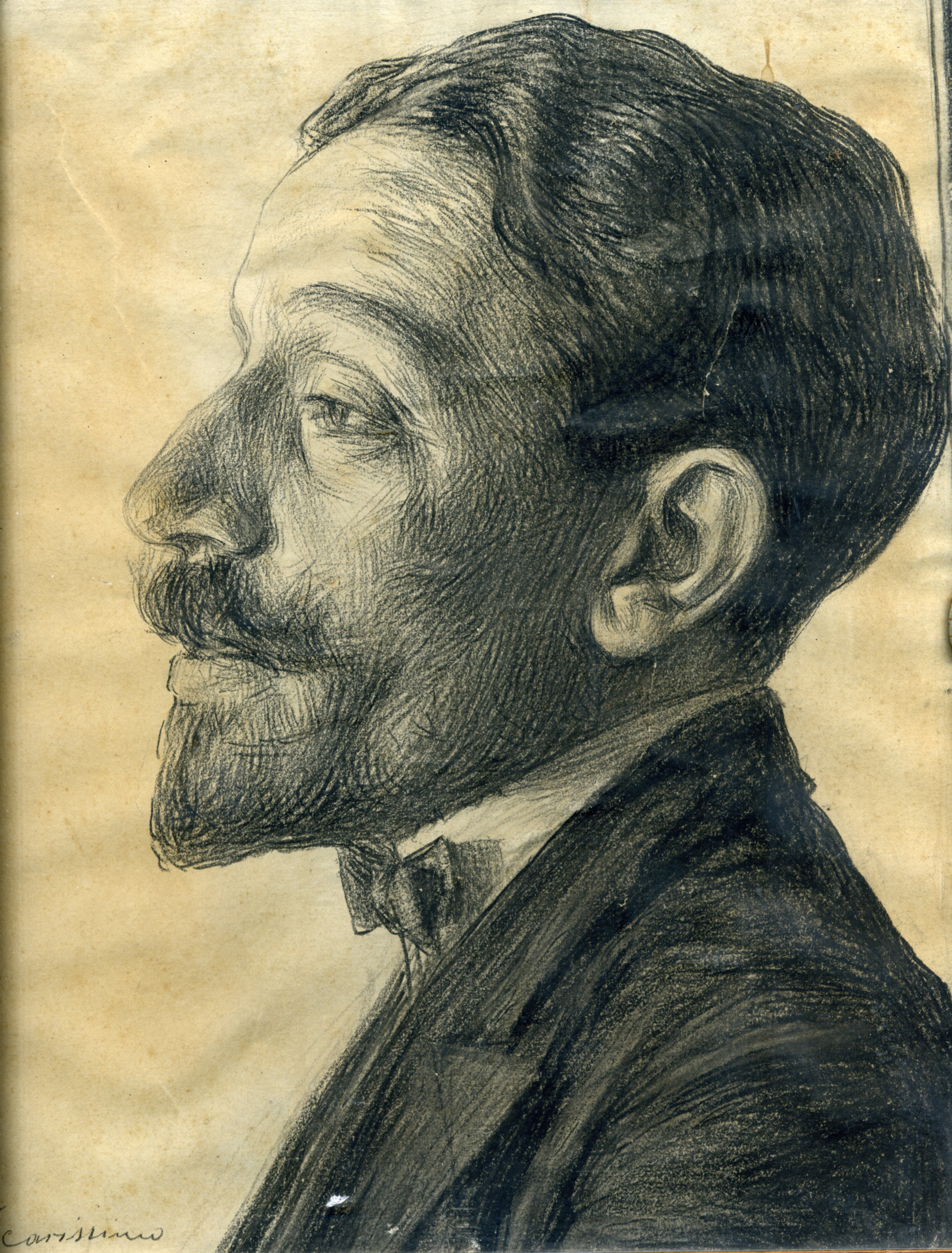
1904 portrait of Guelfo Civinini

Guelfo Civinini (1 August 1873, Livorno – 10 April 1954, Rome) was an Italian poet, playwright, novelist, journalist, critic, opera librettist, academic, military combatant, Western explorer, documentary filmmaker, and archaeologist. Best known internationally as the co-author of the libretto for Giacomo Puccini's opera La fanciulla del West (1910), Civinini began his career as a writer in the 1890s working as both a journalist and critic of literature and art for a variety of Italian newspapers and magazines. His first book of poetic verses, L'urna, was published in 1901 and was the recipient of a national literary prize. After this, he continued to work as a journalist and critic and publish and write poetry, but expanded his interests into writing numerous plays for theatres in Rome and Milan. In 1912 his novel, Gente di palude, was published. He was awarded several literary prizes, including the Mussolini Prize for literature in 1933; the Viareggio Prize in 1937; and the Marzotto Prize in 1953.

Civinini served as a "journalist-fighter", a term he coined, during World War I; simultaneously working as a war correspondent for the Corriere della Sera and as a military combatant. He wrote about his experience as a 'journalist-fighter' in the non-fiction autobiographical book Viaggio intornoalla guerra: dall'Egeo al Baltico (1919, Milan). An ardent nationalist and politically outspoken, he was a supporter of first Gabriele D'Annunzio and the Italian Regency of Carnaro just after World War I; and later became a supporter of Benito Mussolini as a member of the National Fascist Party. However, his relationship with the fascist party in Italy soured during World War II. Unhappy with the discriminatory Italian racial laws passed by the Italian Social Republic and opposed to the nation's alliance with Nazi Germany in the Pact of Steel, Civinini distanced himself from the fascist party and, as a result, his works were banned from being sold by the government of the Italian Social Republic.

In addition to his work as a writer, Civinini embarked on several exploratory expeditions on the continent of Africa in the 1920s and 1930s; the most notable of which was a 1926 expedition whose purpose was to locate the body of Italian explorer Vittorio Bottego. His experiences in Africa resulted in the publication of several auto-biographical non-fiction books and the creation of a documentary film in 1924. In 1934 he purchased the Tower of Santa Liberata in Monte Argentario where he performed his own excavations which resulted in the discovery of the Villa Enobarbi built at the time of the Roman Empire. This archeologic work led to his election to the membership of the Royal Academy of Italy, the highest society for academics in that nation, in 1939.

== Early life and career ==
Born in Livorno, Guelfo Civinini was the son of Francesco and Quintilia Lazzerini; one of six children born to that couple. Shortly after his birth, the family moved to Grosseto where his father died when Guelfo was three years old. The death of his father left the family in difficult economic circumstances, and the family resided in the poorest regions in the Roman countryside at a time with those areas were plagued with outbreaks of malaria. Of the six children in the family only Guelfo and his brother Ricciotto survived to adulthood. These tragic childhood events later informed Civini's 1912 novel Gente di palude with many of the illnesses and strifes of his upbringing inspiring the novel's events.

At the age of 10, Guelfo moved with his family to Rome after the marriage of his mother to his step-father. There he was educated at the Liceo Umberto I under Giuseppe Chiarini. He began his career as a writer working as a journalist and both a literary and art critic for several publications in the 1890s, including the magazine Il Marzocco and the Rome newspaper La Tribuna among others. He had his first major critical success with his poem Gattacieca for which he won a national literary prize in 1906; an award adjudicated by Giovanni Verga, Luigi Capuana, and Federico De Roberto.

== Later life and career ==
As a poet, Civinini is sometimes included as part of the "crepuscolari" group of writers based on his work L'urna (1901); although this classification has been contested by some writers on Italian literature as his overall body of work is reminiscent of the style of Gabriele D'Annunzio and Giosuè Carducci while also displaying influences of Giovanni Pascoli. This work was his first publication of poetic verses. After this he became a prolific playwright in the contemporary theatre scenes of Rome and Milan. His plays included La casa riconsacrata (1904), Il signor Dabbene (1906), Seguite poi da Notturno (1907), Bamboletta (1908), La regina (1910), Suor Speranza (1911), Ius primae noctis (1912), Il sangue (1922), Moscaio (1926), Rottami (1926), and the later work Ripresa con il nuovo titolo Rancore (1948).

Internationally he is best known for writing the Italian language libretto with Carlo Zangarini to Giacomo Puccini's opera La fanciulla del West which premiered at the Metropolitan Opera in 1910. The opera was adapted from David Belasco's 1905 English language play The Girl of the Golden West. His output of literature also included books of poetry, non-fiction, and fiction; short stories; literary criticism, and plays. He was awarded several literary prizes, including the Mussolini Prize for literature in 1933; the Viareggio Prize in 1937; and the Marzotto prize in 1953.

During World War I, Civinini was a war correspondent for the Corriere della Sera. A believer in the "journalist-fighter", Civinini not only reported on the war but also participated as a combatant earning multiple military awards for bravery. He chronicled his experiences as the "journalist-fighter' in World War I in the non-fiction auto-biographical work Viaggio intornoalla guerra: dall'Egeo al Baltico (1919, Milan)

At the end of the war, Civinini was a supporter of Gabriele D'Annunzio and the Italian Regency of Carnaro, and was appointed that organization's representative to Egypt. An ardent nationalist and supporter of Benito Mussolini, he joined the National Fascist Party in the spring of 1923. In 1925 he was one of the signers of the Manifesto of the Fascist Intellectuals. Later, however, he became disillusioned with the party and Mussolini after the passing of the Italian racial laws which discriminated against Italian Jews and the native African inhabitants, and also opposed the Pact of Steel in which Italy aligned itself with Nazi Germany. At this point, he dissociated himself from Mussolini and the fascist party, so much so, that his books were banned for sale in 1944 by the government of the Italian Social Republic. Initially accused of wrong-doing by the Commissione di epurazione in 1945, an official anti-Italian Facisct commission equivalent to the denazification tribunals in Germany following the Second World War, he was eventually cleared of all charges in 1948.

In the years between World War I and World War II, Civinini embarked on several Western exploration expeditions on the continent of Africa; notably making the 1924 documentary film Aethiopia for the Istituto Luce. In 1926 he embarked on an expedition whose goal was to locate and recover the body of Italian explorer Vittorio Bottego who had been murdered in 1897 while exploring regions unknown to the West in Africa. That expedition was largely funded by Francesco Ruspoli, 8th Prince of Cerveteri who accompanied him on the journey. The men were successful at locating the area in which Bottego was killed and were shown a place where he was allegedly buried, but their excavations of the site never recovered Bottego's body. In 1935 he served in the Second Italo-Ethiopian War as a volunteer and was awarded a war cross for military valor. The search for Bottego was chronicled in the non-fiction book Un viaggio attraverso l'Abissinia sulle orme di Vittorio Bottego (1951). His other experiences in Africa were chronicled in the autobiographical works Sotto le piogge equatoriali (1930, Rome) and Ricordi di carovana (1932, Milan).

In 1930 Civinini moved from Rome to Florence where he resided, when not travelling, until 1952 when he moved to Viareggio. In 1934 he purchased the Tower of Santa Liberata in Monte Argentario; a structure built by the Spanish in the 16th century. There he performed his own archaeological excavations which uncovered the Villa Enobarbi built at the time of the Roman Empire. In 1939 he was elected as a member of the Royal Academy of Italy and was named "Honorary Inspector for Monuments, Excavations and Works of Antiquity and Art for Monteargentario and Orbetello" by that institution.

Civinini died in Rome on 10 April 1954, after suffering a stroke in 1953 which left him paralyzed.
