= Breath of the Gods =

2012 film

Breath of the Gods – A Journey to the Origins of Modern Yoga
- Directed by: Jan Schmidt-Garre
- Written by: Jan Schmidt-Garre
- Produced by: Marieke Schroeder
- Cinematography: Diethard Prengel
- Edited by: Gaby Kull-Neujahr
- Music by: Sorabji, Rachmaninov, Medtner, Feuchtwanger, Borodin, Zeckwer, Castelnuovo-Tedesco, Debussy, Rimsky-Korsakoff
- Production company: PARS Media
- Release date: 5 January 2012 (Germany)
- Running time: 105 minutes
- Country: Germany
- Languages: English; Kannada; Tamil; Telugu

Breath of the Gods – A Journey to the Origins of Modern Yoga (German: Der atmende Gott – Reise zum Ursprung des modernen Yoga) is a 2012 German documentary about the origins of modern yoga as exercise in the life and work of Tirumalai Krishnamacharya.

== Summary ==
Jan Schmidt-Garre depicts the life and work of Tirumalai Krishnamacharya by interviewing people who knew him. He is told how and why this pioneer started to run a public Hatha yoga school and shares the information with the audience. Contemporary shots are intercut with historical footage. Thus he explores questions which are crucial for Western adepts, such as whether Hatha Yoga really is of ancient origin and whether it is free from religion or interwoven with hinduistic beliefs. Finally he reveals that Krishnamacharya regularly attended a temple where was inspired by ancient pictures of an ancient demonstrating asanas.

== Selected list of appearing persons ==
- T. Krishnamacharya
- K. Pattabhi Jois
- B. K. S. Iyengar
- T. K. Sribhashyam
- Alamelu Sheshadri

== Reception ==
Rotten Tomatoes, a review aggregator, reports that 44% of nine surveyed critics gave the film a positive review; the average rating was 5.2/10. Siobhan Synnot of The Scotsman wrote, "True believers may be riveted by this earnest salute to the sun, but for others this enthusiastic showcase of impressively bendy people stretches the patience at 105 minutes." Mike McCahill of The Guardian rated it 2/5 stars and called it "wearyingly attenuated". Patrick Peters of Empire rated it 3/5 stars and called it a "lyrical, thoughtful, moving pilgrimage". Kevin Harley of Total Film rated it 3/5 stars and wrote that "it lacks narrative momentum but not warm humour or extreme headstands". Umut Gunduz of Little White Lies wrote that the film is ruined by the host's lack of knowledge about the topic. Allan Hunter of the Daily Express called it "a surprisingly engaging documentary". Noémie Luciani of Le Monde wrote: "Thanks to some fine editing, transmission is also the visual watchword of this documentary. Amid the footage gathered during the shooting, the director inserts superb black-and-white archival footage from the 1930s, showing Krishnamacharya, his family and his school at work. The careful but unobtrusive splicing effects and the classical music, which elegantly replaces the expected folk sounds, give the documentary a most pleasing fluidity."
