= Gigliola Frazzoni =

Italian operatic soprano

- Gigliola Frazzoni (photo with dedication)
- Occupation: opera soprano singer

Gigliola Frazzoni (22 February 1923 – 3 December 2016) was an Italian operatic soprano.

She was born in Bologna, where she studied with Blanche Marchesi and Olivio Secchiaroli, and made her debut at the Teatro Comunale Bologna, as Mimi in La bohème. She quickly enjoyed considerable success at major opera houses throughout Italy, Turin, Venice, Parma, Palermo, Rome and Milan, etc. She was a regular guest at the Verona Arena from 1956 to 1972. On 26 January 1957 she took part in the world premiere of Francis Poulenc's Dialogues des Carmélites, as Mère Marie, at La Scala in Milan.

Beginning in 1954, she also sang outside Italy, notably in Cairo, Munich, Stuttgart, Wiesbaden, Zurich, Vienna, Bordeaux, Dublin, etc.

She was admired in dramatic roles, especially by Verdi and Puccini and some other verismo composers such as Mascagni, Leoncavallo, Giordano. She can be heard on a complete recording of Tosca, opposite Ferruccio Tagliavini and Giangiacomo Guelfi and in Jan Schmidt-Garre's film Opera Fanatic and also as Minnie in La fanciulla del West by Puccini together with Franco Corelli as Ramerrez and Tito Gobbi as Rance –Live Recording, La Scala, Milan, 4 April 1956.

== Sources ==
- Operissimo.com
