= Carlo Zangarini =

Italian composer

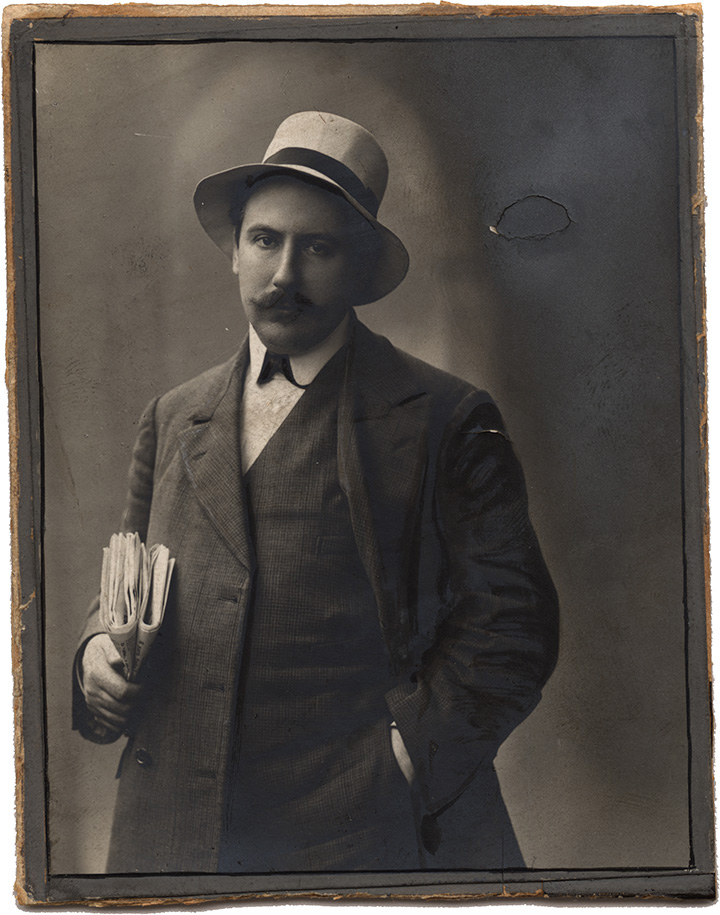
Carlo Zangarini (before 1943) - Archivio storico Ricordi FOTO000766

Carlo Zangarini (9 December 1873 – 19 July 1943) was an Italian librettist, poet, and academic. He lived his entire life in the city of Bologna, and is best remembered today for penning the libretti for the operas La fanciulla del West (1910) by composer Giacomo Puccini, I gioielli della Madonna (1911) by composer Ermanno Wolf-Ferrari, and Conchita (1911) by Riccardo Zandonai.

== Life and career ==
Born in Bologna, Zangarini's father was Italian and his mother was an American. His mixed heritage made him an ideal choice to serve as Giacomo Puccini's librettist for his 1910 opera La fanciulla del West; a work which he co-authored with the poet Guelfo Civinini. Set in the Western United States and adapted from David Belasco's 1905 play The Girl of the Golden West, the opera tells the story of a Californian mining camp during the 1849 Gold Rush.

In addition to La fanciulla del West, Zangarini also wrote the libretti for the operas I gioielli della Madonna (1911) by composer Ermanno Wolf-Ferrari and Conchita (1911) by Riccardo Zandonai. He also translated two French language operas into Italian for performances of those works in Italy: Luigi Cherubini's 1797 opera Médée, and Claude Debussy's 1902 opera Pelléas et Mélisande. The composer Ottorino Respighi set several of his Zangarini's poems to music, including "Scherzo", "Stornellatrice", and "Invito alla danza".

Zangarini lived his entire life in the city of Bologna, and served as the chair of poetic and dramatic literature at the Conservatorio Giovanni Battista Martini (then known as the Liceo Musicale di Bologna) during the last seven years of his life (1934-1943). He died in Bologna in 1943.
