= Carla Gavazzi =

Italian operatic soprano

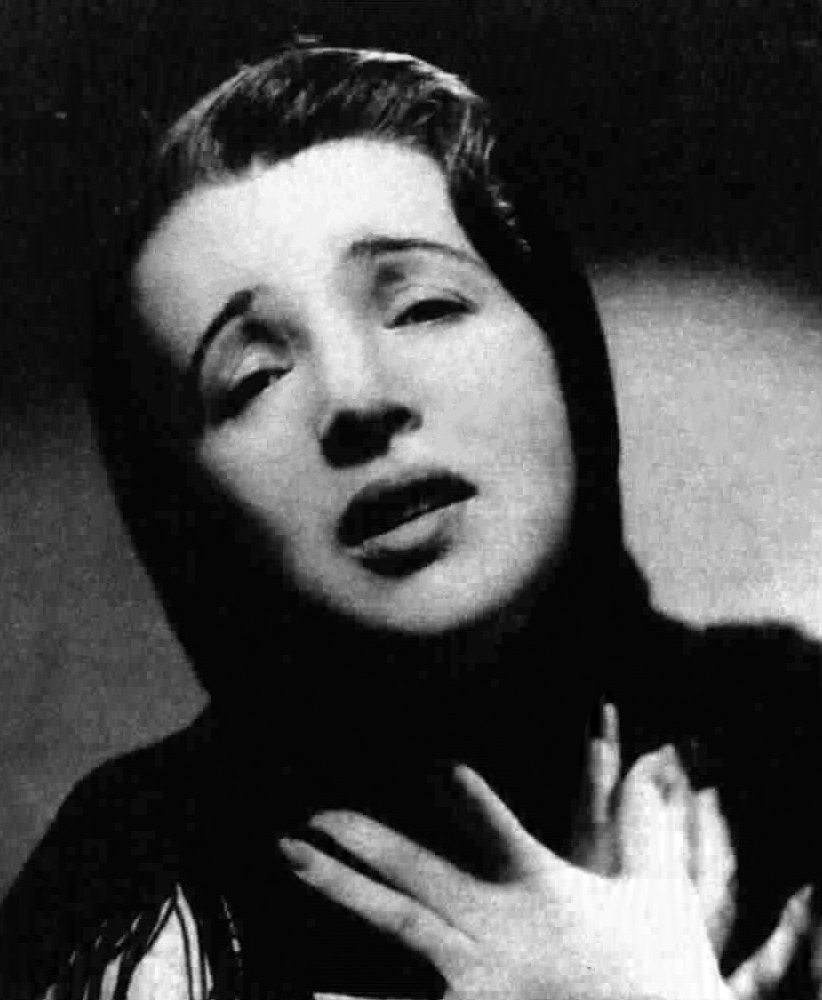
Carla Gavazzi

Carla Gavazzi (26 February 1913 in Bergamo – 25 May 2008 in Milan) was an Italian operatic soprano, largely based in Italy, and particularly associated with the verismo repertory.

Carla Gavazzi was one of many talented Italian sopranos from the 1950s, who were eclipsed by the likes of Renata Tebaldi and Maria Callas. She possessed a powerful, warm and vibrant voice combined with expressive delivery and fine musicianship.

Carla Gavazzi as Suzel in L'amico Fritz

She made her debut as Mimi in La bohème, in 1940, and sang throughout Italy in the standard lirico-spinto repertory, encompassing works by Mozart, Puccini and Verdi.

She was also admired in contemporary works such as; Hindemith's Mathis der Maler, Malipiero's La favola del figlio cambiato, Respighi's La campana sommersa, Refice's Margherita da Cortona, Alfano's Cyrano de Bergerac and Risurrezione. Alfano also chose her for the premiere of his song cycle to poetry by Tagore.

Gavazzi appeared in an Italian television production of Cavalleria rusticana in 1957 and in Jan Schmidt-Garre's film Opera Fanatic in 1998, and made a number of recordings with Cetra in the early 1950s such as Donna Elvira in Don Giovanni, Nedda in Pagliacci, Adriana in Adriana Lecouvreur, and Minnie in La fanciulla del west.

In 1959, family-related reasons caused her to retire from the stage.

== Sources ==
- Musicweb-international.com, Christopher Howell, February 2003.
- Opera News, Obituaries, August 2008.
