= İpekçi =

İpekçi (also spelled Ipakchi, Persian: ایپکچی) is a Turkish and Iranian Azeri surname. İpekçi means in Turkish "someone who produces or deals in silk".

it may refer to:

== Surname ==
- Abdi İpekçi, Turkish journalist
- Handan İpekçi, Turkish screenwriter
- İsmail Cem İpekçi, Turkish politician

== Places named for Abdi İpekçi ==
- Abdi İpekçi Arena
- Abdi İpekçi Avenue, Şişli, İstanbul
- Abdi İpekçi Avenue, Bayrampaşa, İstanbul
