= Heidi Brunner =

Swiss opera singer (born 1966)

Heidi Brunner (born 1966) is a Swiss opera singer. She began her career as a mezzo-soprano at the Anhaltisches Theater in Dessau in 1993. After making appearances at the opera houses in Basel, Innsbruck, and Biel, she was a member of both the Vienna State Opera and Vienna Volksoper from 1996 to 1999. Among the roles she sang in Vienna were Adalgisa in Norma, Annio in La clemenza di Tito, and the title role in La Cenerentola. She then sang as a guest artist with theatres throughout Europe, including making appearances at the Bavarian State Opera, the Grand Théâtre de Genève, the Komische Oper Berlin, the Liceu, and the Salzburg Festival. In the 2004-2005 season she began performing roles from the soprano repertoire, beginning with a performance of Franz Schreker's Irrelohe.
