= Régine Crespin =

French singer (1927–2007)

- Crespin in 1975
- Born: 23 February 1927; Marseille, France
- Died: 5 July 2007 (aged 80); Paris, France
- Occupation: Operatic soprano
- Organizations: Opéra National de Paris
- Awards: Legion of Honour

Régine Crespin (23 February 1927 – 5 July 2007) was a French soprano who had a major international career in opera and on the concert stage between 1950 and 1989. She started her career singing roles in the dramatic soprano and spinto soprano repertoire, drawing particular acclaim singing Wagner and Strauss heroines. She went on to sing a wider repertoire that embraced Italian, French, German, and Russian opera from a variety of musical periods. In the early 1970s Crespin began experiencing vocal difficulties for the first time and ultimately began performing roles from the mezzo-soprano repertoire. Throughout her career she was widely admired for the elegance, warmth and subtlety of her singing, especially in the French and German operatic repertories.

Crespin began her career in France, earning her first critical successes in the French provinces during the early 1950s and then becoming a fixture at the Opéra National de Paris in the mid-1950s. Her international career was launched in 1958 with a critically acclaimed performance of Kundry in Richard Wagner's Parsifal at the Bayreuth Festival. She soon appeared at most of the major opera houses in the United States and Europe and also made a number of appearances in South America. She had a long and fruitful association with the Metropolitan Opera in New York City, making over 125 appearances at that house between 1962 and 1987. Crespin retired from the stage in 1989, after which she taught singing for many years at her alma mater, the Conservatoire de Paris, and gave numerous acclaimed master classes at conservatories and universities internationally.

In recognition of Crespin's artistry as a singer, the Marguerite Long–Jacques Thibaud Competition, which had been restricted to pianists and violinists, was expanded in 2011 to include singers, and renamed the Long-Thibaud-Crespin Competition.

== Early life and education: 1927–1950 ==
Crespin was born in Marseille in 1927. She moved to Nîmes with her family at the age of five and her parents Henri and Margherita opened a large shoe store in that city, Palombo, which they ran for many years. Crespin's childhood was not an easy one, being affected both by growing up during World War II and her mother's alcoholism. She initially intended to be a pharmacist but was prevented in pursuing this path after failing to pass her Baccalauréat at the age of 16. Up to this point her father had not allowed her to study singing. However, as her career path was limited by the exam results he finally allowed her to start taking lessons for purely pragmatic reasons. She went on to win first prize in a singing competition a few years later, and, at the age of 19, she went to Paris to study at the Conservatoire de Paris in the classes of Suzanne Cesbon-Viseur, Paul Cabanel and Georges Jouatte. Four years later, in 1950, she was awarded first prize in the school's onstage competitions for opera and opéra comique and second prize in the school's singing competition. Traditionally past winners of Conservatoire's competitions were offered performance contracts with the Opéra National de Paris, but Crespin was for some unknown reason not offered one. This created a somewhat tenuous relationship between Crespin and her country's musical establishment which extended into the early portion of her career.

== Early career in France: 1950–1957 ==
Her first professional stage engagement was in Reims in 1949 (Charlotte in Werther) while she was still studying at the Conservatoire. Crespin was then engaged by the Opéra national du Rhin to portray Elsa in Richard Wagner's Lohengrin – sung in French – at Mulhouse in 1950. Received with positive reviews, Crespin was finally approached by the Paris Opéra with a contract. She accepted and made her debut there in 1951 singing Elsa. On 27 June 1951 she made her debut at the Opéra-Comique singing the title role in Giacomo Puccini's Tosca, later singing Santuzza in Cavalleria rusticana. However, her reception in Paris was somewhat cool and did not improve, despite performing a number of roles in that city from 1951/52. Her contract wasn't renewed because the Director Maurice Lehmann thought she was "too fat".

Crespin decided to leave Paris in 1952 and try her luck performing with opera houses in the provinces of France : she sang in Marseilles, Nîmes, Nice, Lyons, Bordeaux, Toulouse, etc. There she found her first critical successes, particularly in the roles of the Marschallin in Richard Strauss's Der Rosenkavalier and Tosca, both sung in French. In 1955 she returned to the Paris Opéra as Rezia in Carl Maria von Weber's Oberon. This time enthusiastically received by Paris audiences, Crespin went on to sing several triumphant performances at that house over the next three years, as Desdemona in Giuseppe Verdi's Otello, Amelia in Verdi's Un ballo in maschera, Brunehild in Sigurd and Madame Lidoine in the 1957 Paris premiere of Francis Poulenc's Dialogues of the Carmelites among others. She also continued to remain active in opera houses throughout France, notably singing in the world premiere of Marcel Mirouze's Geneviève de Paris at the Arena of Fourvière (Lyon) in 1955 and in another world premiere, Henri Tomasi's Sampiero Corsu at the Grand Théâtre de Bordeaux in 1956.

== Rise to international success: 1958–1962 ==
Régine Crespin in Fedra, Teatro alla Scala, Milan, 1959-1960

Crespin's international career began when she was chosen by Wieland Wagner to sing Kundry in Wagner's Parsifal at the 1958 Bayreuth Festival, despite the fact that she had never sung Wagner in German. To learn the role in German, she was coached by Lou Bruder, a professor of German literature who later became her husband. When Crespin first auditioned for Wieland she had initially assumed that he would cast her in what the French call les wagnériennes blondes, such as Elsa, Eva, Sieglinde, and Elisabeth. She was therefore surprised when she was asked to tackle Kundry. Crespin recalls that when she expressed her surprise to Wieland he dismissed the other roles, saying, "Oh, those dummies, I don't like them. Look, you are not born for that, you have a better job to do." Crespin's performance was so well liked that she was invited to sing Kundry again for the 1959 and 1960 Bayreuth Festivals. She returned to the festival again in 1961 to sing Sieglinde in Wagner's Die Walküre and the third norn in Götterdämmerung.

Crespin's performances of Kundry effectively launched her international opera career, and she was soon invited to perform on the stages of the world's great opera houses. In 1959 she made her debut at La Scala singing the title role in Ildebrando Pizzetti's Fedra. That same year she made her first appearances at the Vienna State Opera singing Sieglinde in Die Walküre and the Marschallin in Der Rosenkavalier. She sang the Marschallin again for the 1959 Glyndebourne Festival and for her debut at the Royal Opera Covent Garden in 1960, bringing "Gallic finesse, complemented by an ideal sense of proportion, supported by perfect German… she never succumbed to exaggeration, physical or vocal, never seemed fussy, never confused sadness with tragedy". She returned to Covent Garden numerous times over the next four years singing such roles as Elsa in Lohengrin and Tosca. In 1961 she sang for the first time at the Deutsche Oper Berlin. She sang Tosca for her United States debut at the Lyric Opera of Chicago in 1962 with Giuseppe Zampieri as Cavaradossi and Tito Gobbi as Scarpia. She returned to Chicago numerous times, singing such roles as Amelia (1963), Leonore in Beethoven's Fidelio (1963), Elisabeth in Wagner's Tannhäuser (1963), and the title role in Strauss's Ariadne auf Naxos (1964). In 1966, Crespin performed in Boston for the Peabody Mason Concert series.

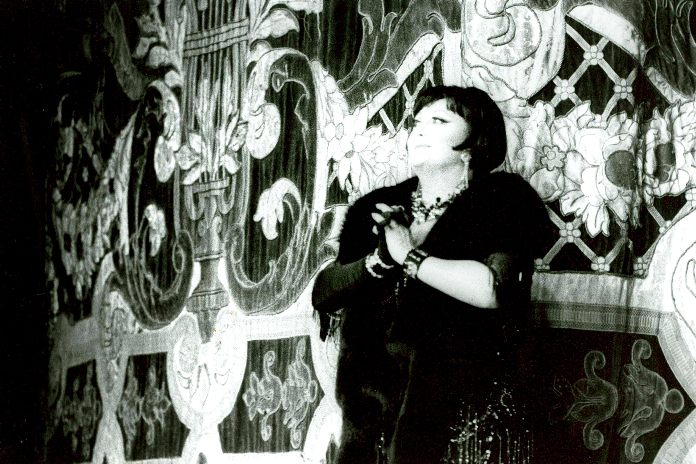
Régine Crespin in the Teatro Colón of Buenos Aires, in 1987 during her last performance.

== International acclaim: 1962–1989 ==
She appeared as Tosca in Geneva in 1962 and in the same year she joined the roster of principal sopranos at the Metropolitan Opera in New York City where she sang every year – with the exception of 1974 – through 1981. Her first performance at the house was on 19 November 1962 singing the Marschallin with Hertha Töpper as Octavian, Otto Edelmann as Baron Ochs, Anneliese Rothenberger as Sophie, and Lorin Maazel conducting. Among the many roles she sang at the Met over the next two decades included Amelia, the title role in Carmen, Charlotte in Werther, Elsa, Giulietta in Les Contes d'Hoffmann Kundry, Santuzza in Cavalleria rusticana, Senta in Der fliegende Holländer, Sieglinde, and Tosca. After leaving the Met in 1981, Crespin returned to the house twice more: once to perform for the Met's 100th Anniversary Gala in 1983 and a final appearance in April 1987 as Madame de Croissy in Dialogues des Carmélites. All told Crespin appeared in 129 performances at the Metropolitan Opera during her career, performing with many leading singers of the time.

During her years at the Metropolitan Opera, Crespin remained active on the international opera stage. In 1961 she made the first of many appearances at the Teatro Colón in Buenos Aires singing the Marschallin and Kundry, returning the next year as Tosca, Fauré's Pénélope and the title role in Gluck's Iphigénie en Tauride and 1964 as both Cassandre and Didon in "Les Troyens". She came back as Berlioz's Marguerite, Werther's Charlotte, Carmen and The Queen of Spades. Her last role at that house was Madame Flora (Baba) in The Medium in 1987.

In 1966 she sang Ariadne at the Aix-en-Provence Festival and that same year made her first appearance at the San Francisco Opera singing both Cassandre and Didon in Berlioz's Les Troyens. She returned to the San Francisco Opera numerous times, singing such roles as Elisabeth in Tannhäuser (1966), the Marschallin (1967), Sieglinde (1968), Tosca (1970), Santuzza (1976), Mme de Croissy (1982), the title role in Offenbach's La Grande-Duchesse de Gérolstein (1983), Madame Flora (1986), and the Countess in Tchaikovsky's The Queen of Spades (1987). In 1963 she made her debut with the Philadelphia Lyric Opera Company portraying Sieglinde, a role which she repeated there in 1965. She later sang with the Opera Company of Philadelphia as Carmen (1978), the Countess (1983), and Madame Flora (1986). Under Karajan, in 1967 Crespin portrayed Brünnhilde in Wagner's Die Walküre for her first appearance at the Salzburg Festival. She also returned to the Opéra National de Paris a handful of times during her career, notably singing the title role in Fauré's Pénélope. Her last opera performance was at the Paris Opéra in 1989 singing the Countess in The Queen of Spades. In 1970, after almost twenty years of faultless reviews, Crespin began experiencing some vocal challenges which caused her to re-evaluate her career. This coincided with the end of her marriage to Lou Bruder to whom she had been married for eleven years; the couple had no children. She also had illnesses and personal issues, all of which brought her to contemplate suicide.

With Charlotte in Werther in 1974, Crespin began performing opera roles for mezzo-soprano to adjust to the change in her voice. However the timbre of her voice had not altered much from her earlier singing years and she therefore brought a different sound to these roles from that of the typical mezzo-soprano. Regardless, she was well received in her new choice of repertoire. This period also led to her interest in Offenbach and her sophisticated wit found its place in recordings of Métella, the Grand Duchess of Gérolstein and La Périchole, along with Dulcinée (Massenet's Don Quichotte).

Crespin sang in many concert halls around the world, where her repertoire included Marguerite in La Damnation de Faust, and Les nuits d'été by Berlioz. In recital, along with lieder (Schumann, Schubert, Brahms) she excelled in the French mélodie repertoire, especially Debussy and Poulenc, where the savouring of words and ability to capture the mood of songs made her a memorable interpreter. She gave the premiere of Marius Constant's Cinq Chants et une vocalise in 1968.

== Later life: 1990–2007 ==
After retiring from singing in 1989, Crespin focused mainly on teaching. She had joined the faculty at the Conservatoire de Paris in 1974 and continued to teach there until 1995. She had also begun teaching at the San Francisco Opera's Merola Opera Program during the latter part of her career, and was involved with that program for more than twenty years. Crespin also frequently traveled to give master classes at Universities and music conservatories in Europe and the United States during her retirement years. She continued to teach until her death from liver cancer in Paris on 5 July 2007. She had previously overcome battles with cancer in 1978 and 1984.

Her memoirs, La vie et l'amour d'une femme (the French name for Schumann's song cycle Frauenliebe und -leben), are quite candid, providing much detail of the singer's private life as well as unusual insights into her professional world. It was first published in French in 1982 and was republished in an expanded version called À la scene, à la ville - in English On Stage, Off Stage: A Memoir – in 1997.

Crespin was appointed Chevalier of the Légion d'honneur in 1972, and later made an Officer in 1982 and a Commander in 1994.

== Recordings ==
In her autobiography Crespin analyses the difficulties she found in the recording process, and notes that the Decca engineers called her, affectionately, 'the French cannon' due to the size of her voice.

Crespin left a considerable discography, starting, in the early part of her career, with recital discs for Véga, Pathé and Decca. Her classic recording of Berlioz's Les nuits d'été and Ravel's Shéhérazade with Ernest Ansermet and the Suisse Romande Orchestra is regarded by many as one of the finest versions on disc. Among her other important recordings were Sieglinde in Die Walküre, and the Marschallin in Der Rosenkavalier, both for Decca with the Vienna Philharmonic conducted by Sir Georg Solti, and Brünnhilde in Die Walküre with the Berlin Philharmonic conducted by Herbert von Karajan on Deutsche Grammophon.

The discography section of her autobiography contains entries for complete works of composers from Berlioz, Bizet, Fauré, Massenet, Offenbach, Poulenc, Strauss to Wagner. She won prizes from the Académie du Disque lyrique, Grand Prix du Disque and Académie Charles-Cros.

From 1954, Crespin regularly featured in numerous broadcasts on the French Radio and Television. Most of them have been archived by the Institut national de l'audiovisuel.
