= Gianna Pederzini =

Italian opera singer

Gianna Pederzini (photo with 1943 dedication)

Gianna Pederzini (10 February 1900 - 12 March 1988) was an Italian mezzo-soprano.

Pederzini was born in Trento. She studied in Naples with Fernando de Lucia, and made her stage debut in Messina, as Preziosilla, in 1923. She sang widely in Italy, notably as Mignon and Carmen, and made her debut at the Teatro San Carlo in Naples, as Adalgisa, in 1928, and at the Teatro alla Scala in Milan, in 1930.

Abroad, she appeared at the Royal Opera House in London in 1931, the Opéra de Paris in 1935, the Teatro Colón in 1938, and the Berlin State Opera in 1941.

She defended a wide repertoire, she took part in the 1930s in revivals of rare operas by Rossini and Donizetti, while singing the standard mezzo roles; Azucena, Ulrica, Amneris, Laura, but also a few dramatic soprano roles such as Santuzza and Fedora, etc. She also often sang Charlotte in Massenet's Werther with Tito Schipa. A live recording exists of one such performance.

In the 1950s, she began concentrating on "character roles" such as the Countess in The Queen of Spades, Mistress Quickly in Falstaff, Madame Flora in The Medium, and took part in the creation of Dialogues of the Carmelites at La Scala, in 1957. She died, aged 88, in Rome.

== Sources ==
- Le guide de l'opéra, les indispensables de la musique, R. Mancini & J.J. Rouvereux, (Fayard, 1986) ISBN 2-213-01563-5
