= Dino Dondi =

Italian baritone (1925–2007)

- Dino Dondi (photo with 1955 dedication)
- Born: July 10, 1925
- Died: March 3, 2007 (aged 81); Basse-Terre, Guadeloupe
- Occupation: Opera singer (baritone)
- Spouse: Irène Companeez

Dino Dondi (10 July 1925 – 3 March 2007) was an Italian operatic baritone.

== Life ==
Like many Bolognese, Dondi had a passion for opera and after studying singing as an autodidact, he met a master who recognised his vocal talent.

At the beginning of the 1950s, after singing in theatres in Emilia, including Bologna, Dondi moved to Milan and in 1954 made his debut at the Teatro Nuovo in Verdi's Rigoletto.

Shortly afterwards, he was called by La Scala, where he sang, among other operas, in Iphigénie en Tauride by Christoph Willibald Gluck under the direction of Luchino Visconti, with Maria Callas and the direction of Nino Sanzogno (1957), and in Verdi's Macbeth, conducted by Thomas Schippers (1958).

He married the contralto, Irène Companeez.

Dondi died in Basse-Terre, prefecture of the French department of Guadeloupe in the Caribbean, at the age of 81.

== Recordings ==
- 1955: Don Sebastiano (Gaetano Donizetti), Carlo Maria Giulini conducting, role: Abaialdo
- 1957: Iphigénie en Tauride (Christoph Willibald Gluck), Nino Sanzogno conducting, role: Oreste
- 1958: Assassinio nella cattedrale (Ildebrando Pizzetti), Gianandrea Gavazzeni conducting, role: Terzo Sacerdote
- 1959: Lucia di Lammermoor by Donizetti, RAI TV Milano, Fernando Previtali conducting, role: Lord Enrico Ashton
- 1960: La Wally (Alfredo Catalani), Arturo Basile conducting, role: Vincenzo Gellner dell'Hochstoff
- 1960: Nabucco (Giuseppe Verdi), Fulvio Vernizzi conducting, role: Nabucodonosor
- 1961: Beatrice di Tenda by Vincenzo Bellini, Antonino Votto conducting, role: Filippo Maria Visconti
- 1966: I puritani by Vincenzo Bellini, Arturo Basile conducting, role: Sir Riccardo Forth
- 1969: Andrea Chénier (Umberto Giordano), Anton Guadagno conducting, role: Carlo Gérard
