= Nino Sanzogno =

Nino Sanzogno

Nino Sanzogno (13 April 1911 – 4 May 1983) was an Italian conductor and composer.

== Life ==
Sanzogno was born in Venice, where he studied the violin with Hermann Scherchen and composition with Gian Francesco Malipiero at the Liceo Musicale. He later studied conducting in Vienna with Scherchen. He conducted the Gruppo Strumentale in concerts in Italy and abroad before becoming resident conductor at La Fenice in Venice in 1937, and the RAI Milan Symphony Orchestra soon afterwards. He first conducted at La Scala in Milan in 1939.

A specialist of contemporary works, he conducted at La Scala the premieres of Milhaud's David, Poulenc's Dialogues des Carmélites, Walton's Troilus and Cressida, Shostakovich's Lady Macbeth of Mtsensk, Berg's Lulu, Britten's A Midsummer Night's Dream, Prokofiev's The Fiery Angel, while abroad, notably in Britain, he introduced several works by Italian composers such as Malipiero, Dallapiccola and Pizzetti. He conducted the premiere of the final revised version of Karl Amadeus Hartmann's First Symphony in 1957.

In 1955, he inaugurated the Piccola Scala, where he conducted several revivals of 18th century works by composers such as Piccinni, Paisiello, Cimarosa, etc. He appeared with this company at the Edinburgh Festival in 1957.

Sanzogno was admired for his precision and firm discipline marked by outward charm and elegance. His compositions include two symphonic poems, I quattro cavalieri del'Apocalisse (1930) and Vanitas (1931), and concertos for viola (1935) and cello (1937), as well as music for chamber ensembles. In later years, he taught conducting in Darmstadt.

He conducted Joan Sutherland's first complete opera studio recording (Rigoletto) with Decca Records in 1961.

He died in Milan in 1983.

== Selected recordings ==
- 1954 – A.Berg – Wozzeck (in Italian) – Tito Gobbi, Dorothy Dow, Hugues Cuénod, Italo Tajo – RAI Orchestra Roma – MYTO Records
- 1956 – D.Cimarosa – Il matrimonio segreto – Eugenia Ratti, Graziella Sciutti, Ebe Stignani, Luigi Alva, Carlo Badioli, Franco Calabrese – Coro e orchestra del Teatro alla Scala – EMI
- 1959 – G.Donizetti – Lucia di Lammermoor – Renata Scotto, Giuseppe di Stefano, Ettore Bastianini, Ivo Vinco – Coro e orchestra del Teatro alla Scala – RICORDI
- 1961 – G.Verdi – Rigoletto – Cornell McNeil, Joan Sutherland, Renato Cioni, Cesare Siepi, Stefania Malagù – Coro e orchestra dell'Accademia di Santa Cecilia, Roma – Decca
- 1965 - Arrigo Boito - Mefistofele - Nicolai Ghiaurov, Renata Tebaldi, Alfredo Kraus - San Francisco - Ornamenti

== Opera films ==
- 1954 – Verdi – La traviata – Rosanna Carteri, Nicola Filacuridi, Carlo Tagliabue – Rai Milan Chorus and Orchestra – BELCANTO
- 1956 – Mozart – Le nozze di Figaro – Heinz Rehfuss, Marcella Pobbe, Rosanna Carteri, Nicola Rossi-Lemeni, Dora Gatta – Rai Milan Chorus and Orchestra – VAI
- 1958 – Mozart – Don Giovanni – Mario Petri, Ilva Ligabue, Luigi Alva, Sesto Bruscantini, Orch. A. Scarlatti, dir. Franco Zeffirelli – RAI

== Sources ==
- Le guide de l'opéra, Roland Mancini & Jean-Jacques Rouveroux, (Fayard, 1989) ISBN 2-213-01563-5
- Grove Music Online, Leonardo Pinzauti, July 2008.
