= Jan Schmidt-Garre =

German film director

Jan Schmidt-Garre (born 18 June 1962 in Munich) is a German film director and producer.

== Life ==
Jan Schmidt-Garre studied philosophy at the Hochschule für Philosophie der Jesuiten in Munich from 1982 to 1986 (M. A. with a semiotic thesis on Wagner's "Ring of the Nibelung"). He also studied feature film direction at Munich's Hochschule für Fernsehen und Film from 1984 to 1988. His mother is famous German critic Beate Kayser.

During this time he worked as a trainee and assistant director for, among others, Rudolf Noelte, Jean-Pierre Ponnelle, David Esrig, Joachim Herz and Harry Kupfer (at the Salzburg Festival, the Bayreuth Festival, the Metropolitan Opera in New York and at the Dresden Opera).

He studied conducting and musical theory with Sergiu Celibidache in Mainz, Munich and Paris.

In 1988 he founded PARS MEDIA, a production company whose films have received international acclaim for its documentary and feature films focusing on music and the arts. PARS MEDIA productions have been awarded numerous prizes worldwide, among them the main prizes at the film festivals in Chicago, Paris, Monte Carlo, Columbus/Ohio, Munich and Prague as well as a nomination for the German Film Award. PARS MEDIA films have been broadcast in over thirty countries, many have been distributed theatrically and appeared on Laser Disc, VHS and DVD.

Schmidt-Garre is staging operas on a regular basis at opera companies in Germany and Switzerland.

Schmidt-Garre, a member of the German Film Academy, lectures on directing and aesthetics at (among others) the HFF Munich and the Athanor Academy of Performing Arts. He is married to art dealer Philomene Magers. They have two children and live in Berlin.

== Filmography (selected) ==
- 360° Figaro

Virtual reality opera film with Jacquelyn Wagner, 2018, 25 Min

- Aida's Brothers & Sisters

Music film, 1999, 90 Min. On DVD with Arthaus Musik

- The Alchemy of the Piano

Music film with Alfred Brendel, Ermonela Jaho, Jean-Rodolphe Kars, Stephen Kovacevich, Sir Antonio Pappano, Francesco Piemontesi and Maria João Pires, 2024, 90 Min

- Belcanto – The Tenors of the 78 Era

Music documentary series, 1996, 390 Min. Prizes at the Columbus International Film Festival and at "Classique en images", ICMA Award. On DVD with Naxos

- Bound

Dance film with Saburo Teshigawara, based on a short story by Ilse Aichinger, 2002, 45 Min. On DVD with Arthaus Musik

- Breath of the Gods – A Journey to the Origins of Modern Yoga

Documentary, 2012, 105 Min. On DVD with Kino Lorber, Jupiter Films, Blue Dolphin and UpLink

- Bruckner's Decision

Feature film, 1995, 80 Min. On DVD with Arthaus Musik

- Celibidache – You Don't Do Anything, You Just Let It Evolve

Documentary film, 1992, 100 Min. Nominated for the German Film Award, won the silver medal at the Chicago International Film Festival and the Midem Classique Award. On DVD with Arthaus Musik

- Chopin at the Opera

Film Essay, 2010, 60 Min. On DVD with Arthaus Musik

- Fidelio

Film version of a production with Jacquelyn Wagner, Norbert Ernst and Roman Trekel, 2018, 115 Min. Directed for the stage and for the screen by Jan Schmidt-Garre. On DVD with Euroarts

- Fuoco sacro – A Search for the Sacred Fire of Song

Music documentary with Ermonela Jaho, Barbara Hannigan and Asmik Grigorian, 2021, 92 Min. On DVD with Naxos Audiovisual

- Furtwängler's Love

Film Essay, 2004, 70 Min. Awarded at "Golden Prague". On DVD with Arthaus Musik

- Home Music Berlin

Music film and concert series with Francesco Piemontesi, Christian Tetzlaff, Jacquelyn Wagner, Roman Trekel, Iddo Bar-Shai, Severin von Eckardstein, Elsa Dreisig, Olena Tokar, Sharon Kam, Matan Porat, Tabea Zimmermann and many more, 2020/21, 60 + 14 x 60 min. On DVD with Naxos Audiovisual

- The Inner Film

Series of musical film essays with Zlata Chochieva, Francesco Piemontesi, Ermonela Jaho, Barbara Hannigan, Asmik Grigorian and many more, 2017–...

- Legato – The World of the Piano

Music documentary and concert series, 2006–08, 720 Min. On DVD with Medici Arts

- Long Shot Close Up – Andreas Gursky

Art documentary, 2010, 60 Min. On DVD with Arthaus Musik

- Measure – Color – Light

Art documentary, 1992, 45 Min

- No More Wunderkind – Sergei Nakariakov

Music Documentary, 2004, 60 Min. On DVD with Arthaus Musik

- Olafur Eliasson – Notion Motion

Art documentary, 2005. On DVD with Arthaus Musik

- Opera Fanatic

Opera road movie, 1998, 90 Min. Prizes at the Munich International Documentary Festival and at "Golden Prague" (Czech Crystal). On DVD with Arthaus Musik

- The Promise – Architect BV Doshi

Documentary, 2023, 90 Min

- Sophia – Biography of a Violin Concerto

Music Documentary with Sofia Gubaidulina and Anne-Sophie Mutter, 2008, 60 Min. Nominated for Prix Italia. On DVD with Arthaus Musik

- Super Life

Documentary, 2014, 60 Min. On DVD with Belvedere

- This not that – The Artist John Baldessari

Art Documentary, 2005, 90 Min. On DVD with Arthaus Musik

== Articles and essays ==
- Interview on directing operas
