= Be&Be =

Austrian Catholic publishing house

- Company type: Gesellschaft mit beschränkter Haftung
- Industry: publishing
- Founded: 1931/2007 in Heiligenkreuz, Lower Austria
- Founder: Heiligenkreuz Abbey
- Headquarters: Heiligenkreuz, Lower Austria, Austria
- Area served: German speaking area
- Key people: Karl Wallner OCist (publishing director)
- Owner: Heiligenkreuz Abbey
- Website: www.bebeverlag.at

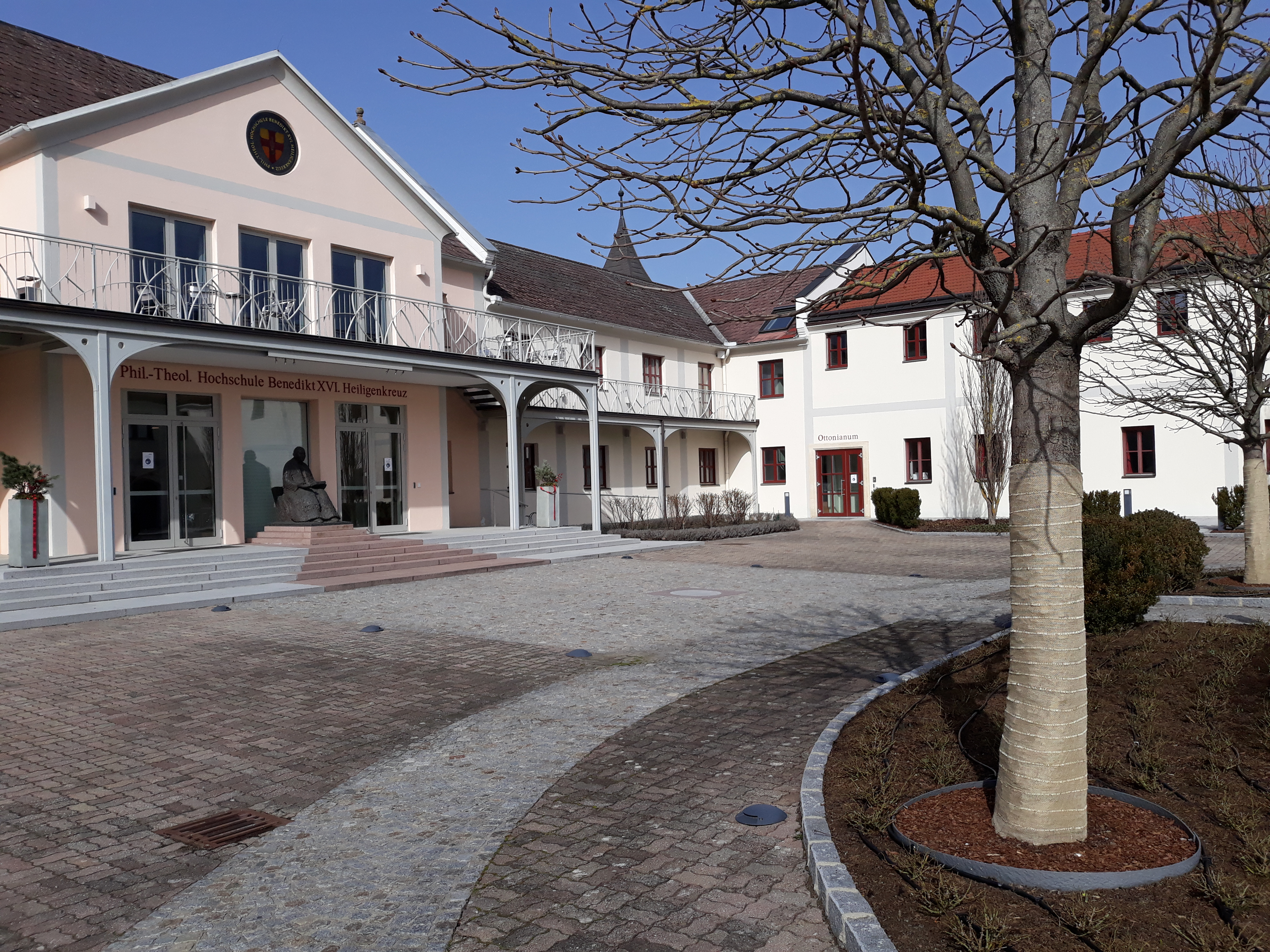
View of the Be&Be headquarters

Be&Be is an Austrian Catholic publishing house based on the campus of the Benedict XVI Philosophical-Theological University in Heiligenkreuz, Lower Austria. Its publishing activity is mainly focused on the publication of books and magazines in the German language.

Among the many titles published so far, the most represented are works by authors in the fields of spirituality, theology, psychology and various religious topics. Many authors of the books published so far deal with themes related to the history, spirituality and work of the Benedictines and Cistercians, as well as themes in art and architecture, and especially topics related to the existence and activity of the Heiligenkreuz Abbey and the Benedict XVI Philosophical-Theological University.

== History ==
The publishing house Be&Be was founded in 1931 by the Cistercians of Heiligenkreuz Abbey under the name Heiligenkreuzer Verlag as a private limited company (German: Gesellschaft mit beschränkter Haftung, abbreviated GmbH): this publishing house initially issued only a series of publications entitled "Heiligenkreuz Studies" (German: Schriftenreihe Heiligenkreuzer Studien), and its activities have been integrated into the economy of Heiligenkreuz Abbey since its foundation. Some of the printed editions are today also valuable theological and educational literature for the needs of the Benedict XVI Philosophical-Theological University.

Since 2007, the publishing house has been operating under the name Be&Be (sometimes as Be+Be), which reflects the spiritual focus and devotion to the character and work of Benedict of Nursia and Bernard of Clairvaux. The director of the publishing house is Karl Wallner, a Cistercian of the Heilgenkreuz Abbey and professor at the Benedict XVI Philosophical-Theological University.

== Authors and publishing ==
The publishing house Be&Be focuses on publishing theological books, Catholic stories and children’s books, novels and, more recently, audiobooks. In addition to publishing periodicals such as Ambo (the yearbook of the Heiligenkreuz University) and the Cistercian multilingual scientific journal Analecta Cisterciensia, it is the publisher’s concern to make current topics accessible to a broad readership in an easily understandable way.

The Little Library of the Western world (German: Kleine Bibliothek des Abendlandes, abbreviated KBA) is one of the specialties of the Be&Be publishing program, which reissues older and sold-out editions on the history of Christianity and clergy in the countries of the Western world.

The authors of most of the published works in the field of spirituality are many Cistercians of the Heiligenkreuz Abbey and professors of the Benedict XVI Philosophical-Theological University, notably Abbot Maximilian Heim, Father Karl Wallner, the German philosopher Hanna-Barbara Gerl-Falkovitz, Father Bernhard Vošicky and the Secretary General of the University, Prior Johannes Paul Chavanne.
