= Kleinmariazell =

District of Altenmarkt an der Triesting, Austria

Coordinates: 48°02′N 15°58′E

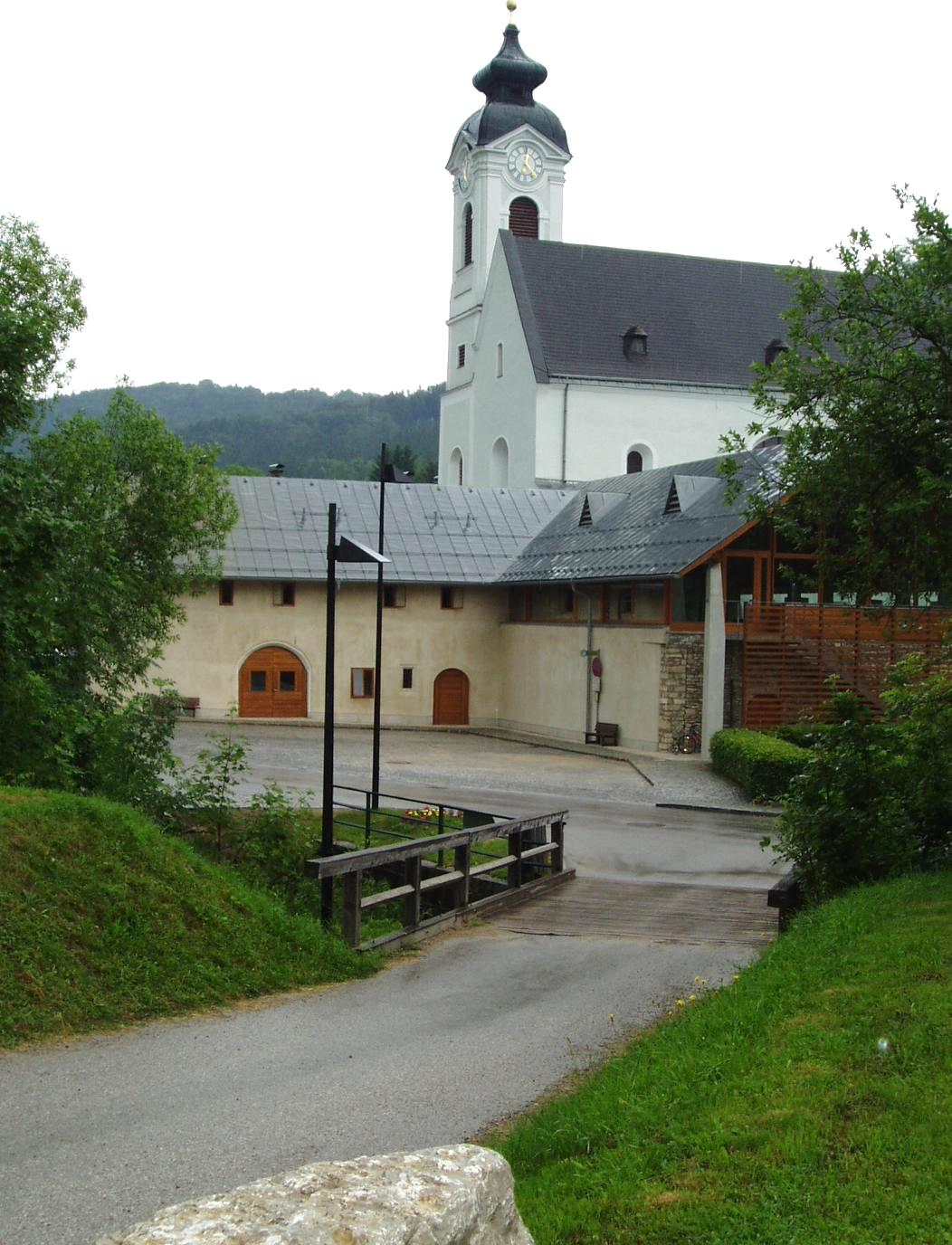
Basilica of Kleinmariazell

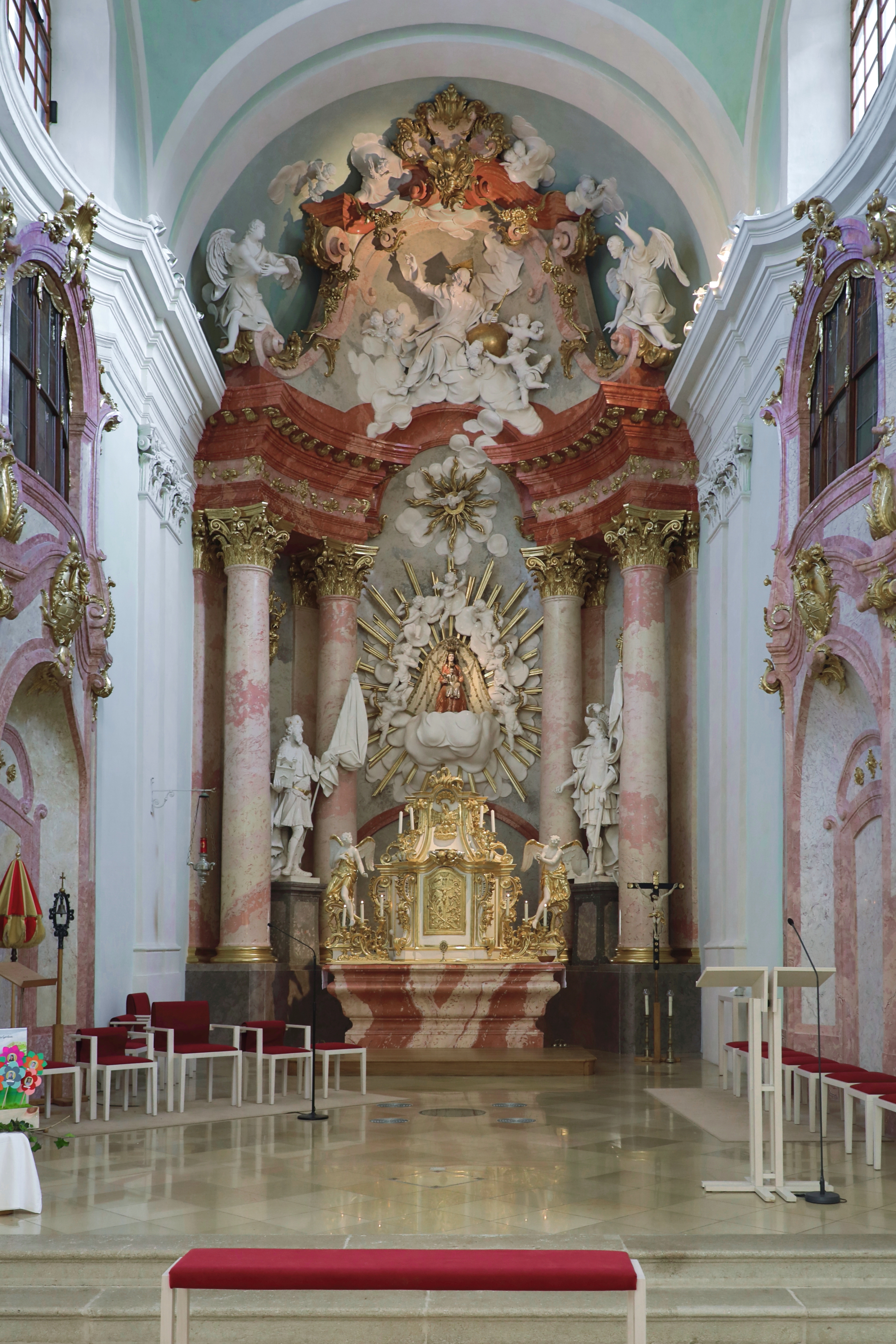
High altar

Kleinmariazell is a district of Altenmarkt an der Triesting in the Wienerwald, Lower Austria, Austria.

== Geography ==
Kleinmariazell is located north of Altenmarkt in a side valley of the Triesting in the direction of Klausen-Leopoldsdorf. The cloister lies on an old pilgrim's trail, the Via Sacra from Vienna to Mariazell.

The community, as well as the cloister, is described and referred to as Mariazell in Austria (as opposed to Mariazell in Styria), Klein-Mariazell Monastery, or Klein-Mariazell Abbey. Aside from a few houses on the street and an inn, it is made up exclusively of the historic cloister buildings.

== History ==
History of Kleinmariazell:

- 1134 or 1136: The church and monastery were founded by Heinrich and Rapoto of Schwarzburg-Nöstach as well as the Babenberg Margrave Leopold III the Holy of Austria as Cella Sancte Marie, a Benedictine monastery.
- 1782: The monastery was dissolved in the course of the Josephine Reforms and felt into decay.
- 1825: The monastery and its lands were put up for auction. Many owners followed, and the monastery was turned into a palace. The former monastery church became the local parish church.
- 1998: After a general renovation by the Archdiocese of Vienna with public and private support, the church was returned its original purpose.
- 2005: Near the church complex an apartment annex was built to hold, among others, 8 priests.

The current group of buildings follows the modern ideas of restoration and monument protection. The names of Christoph Cardinal Schönborn and Deacon Franz Eckert are closely connected with the building.

== Frescoes ==
During 1764 – 1765, Johann Baptist Wenzel Bergl painted numerous frescoes in the basilica.

=== Central dome ===
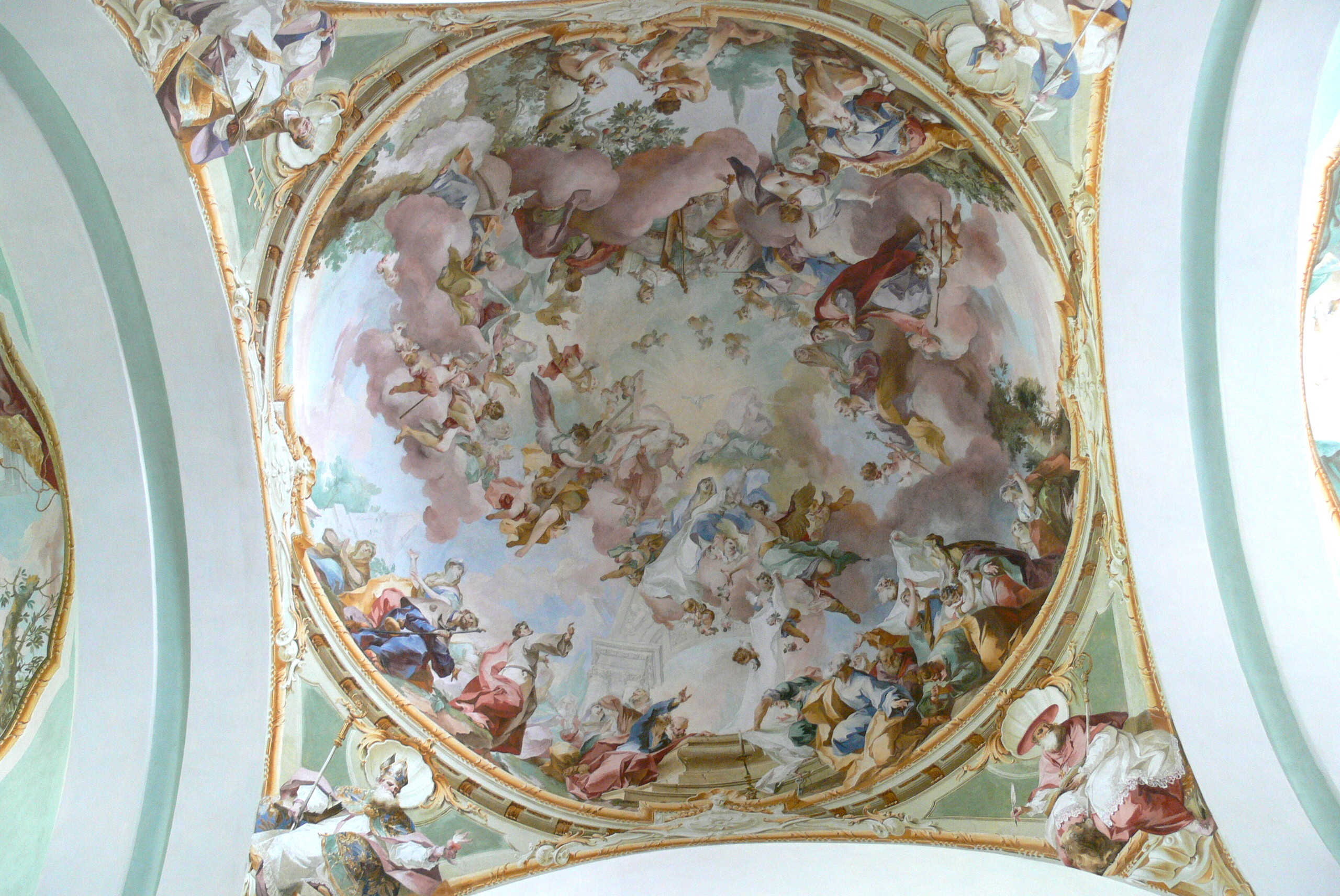
Central dome

=== Pendentives around central dome ===
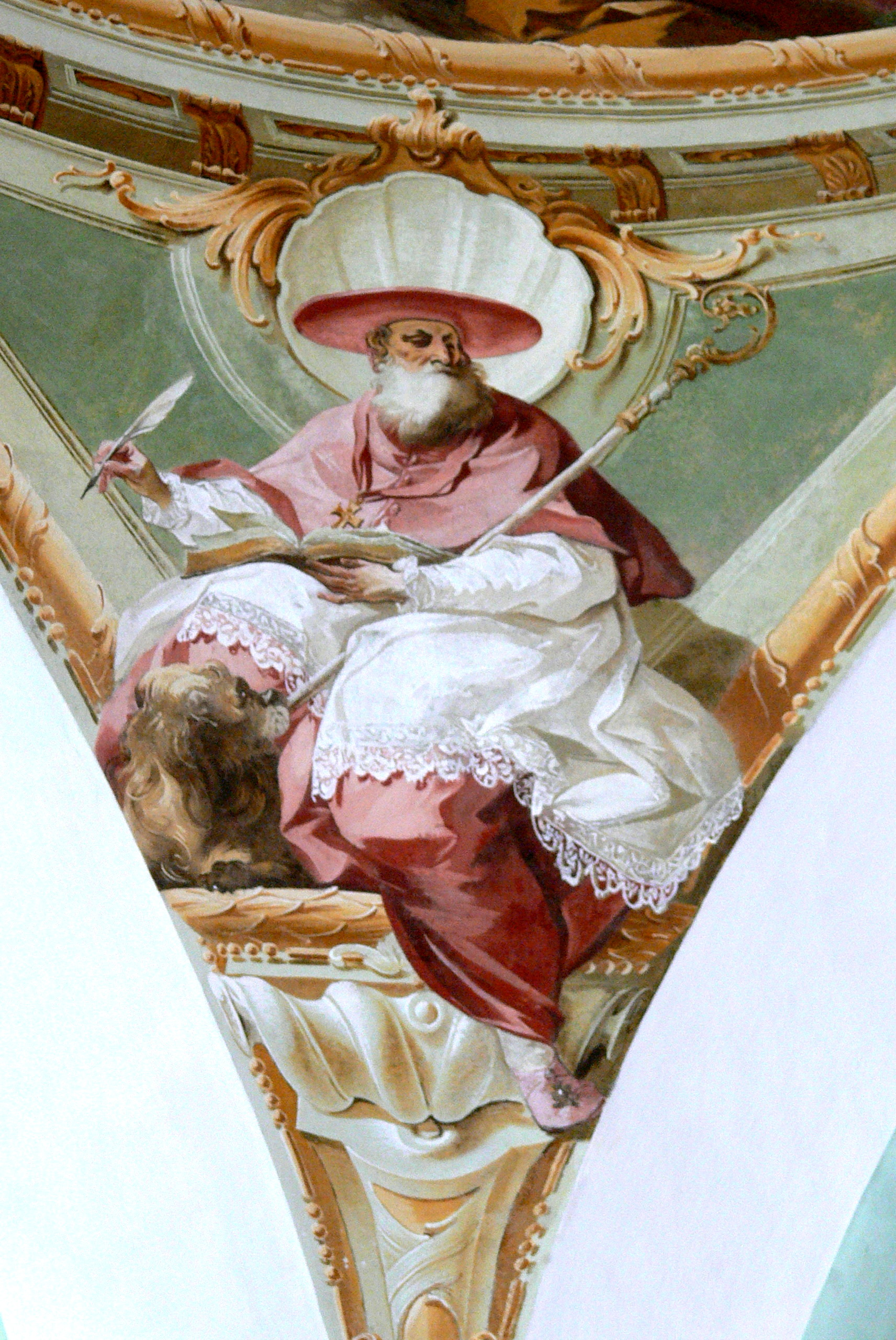
Saint Jerome

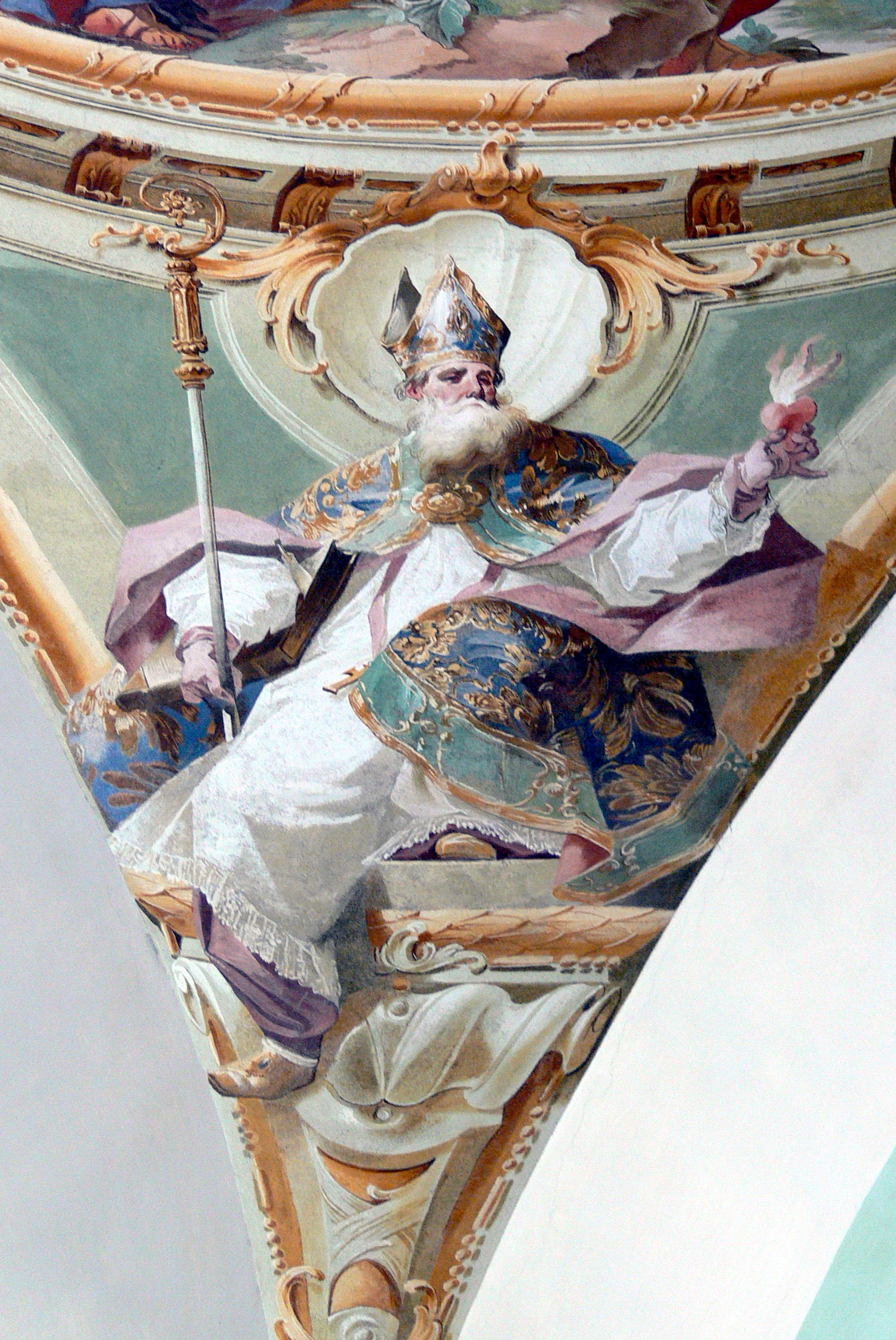
Saint Augustine

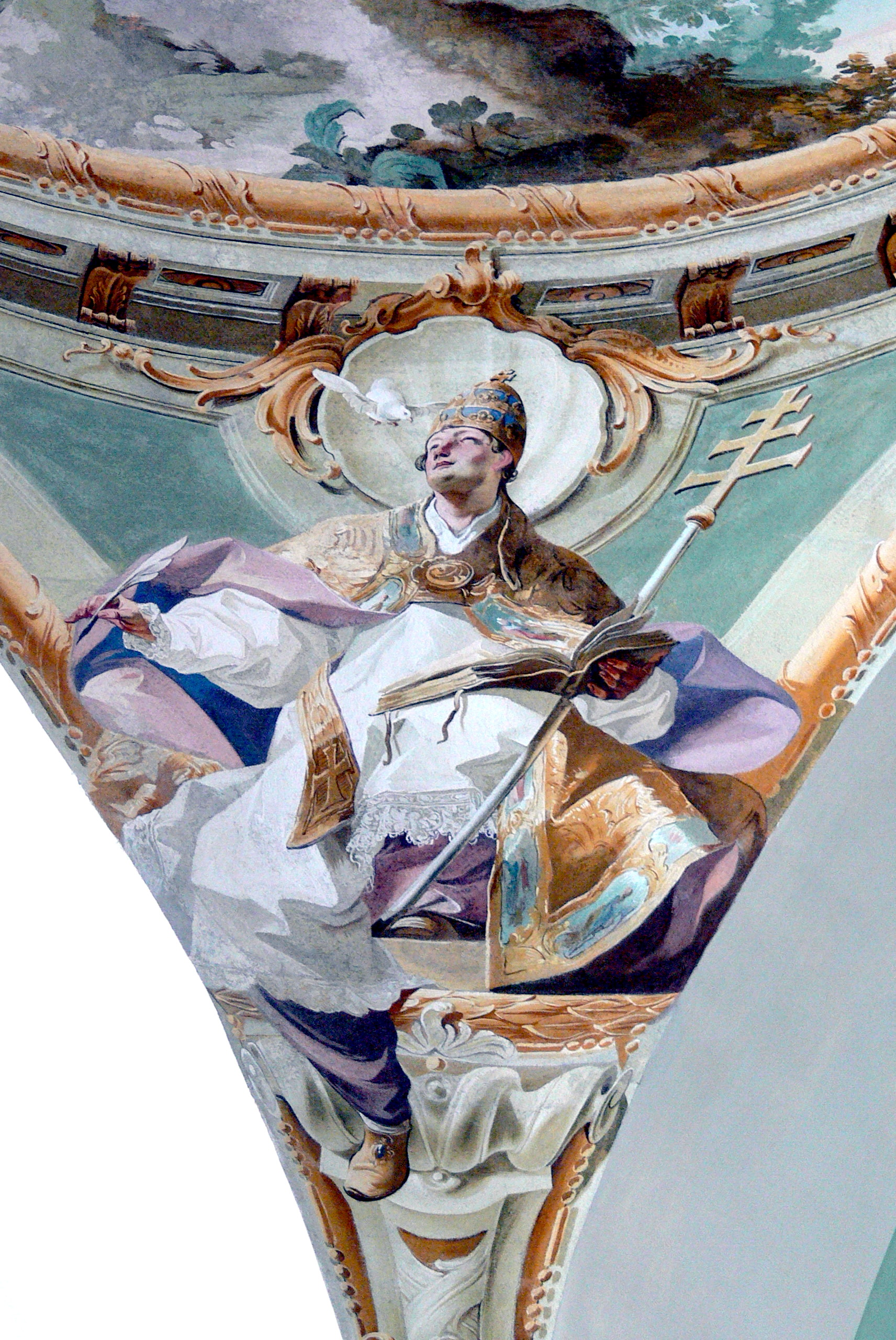
Saint Gregory

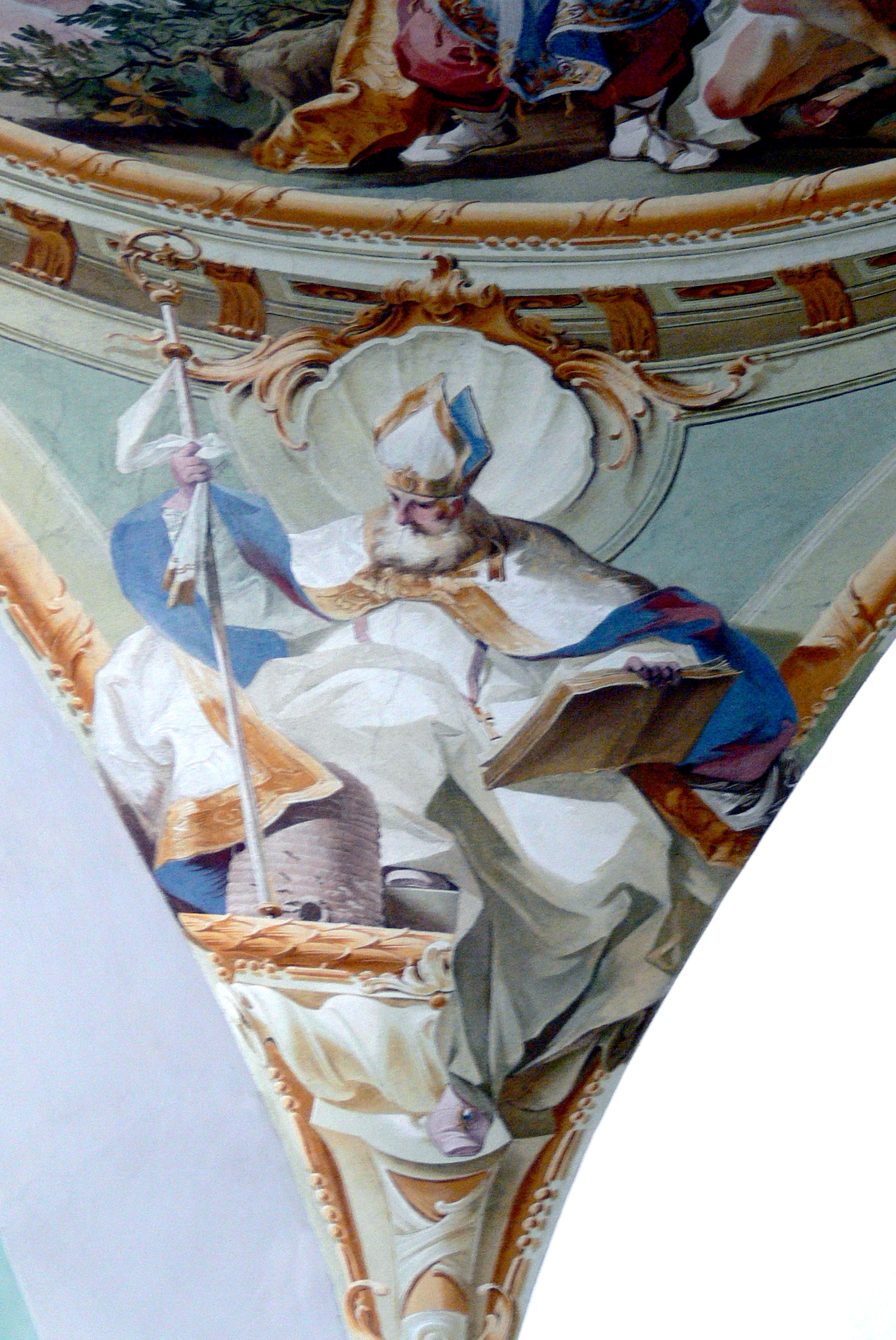
Saint Ambrose

=== Close-ups of the central dome ===
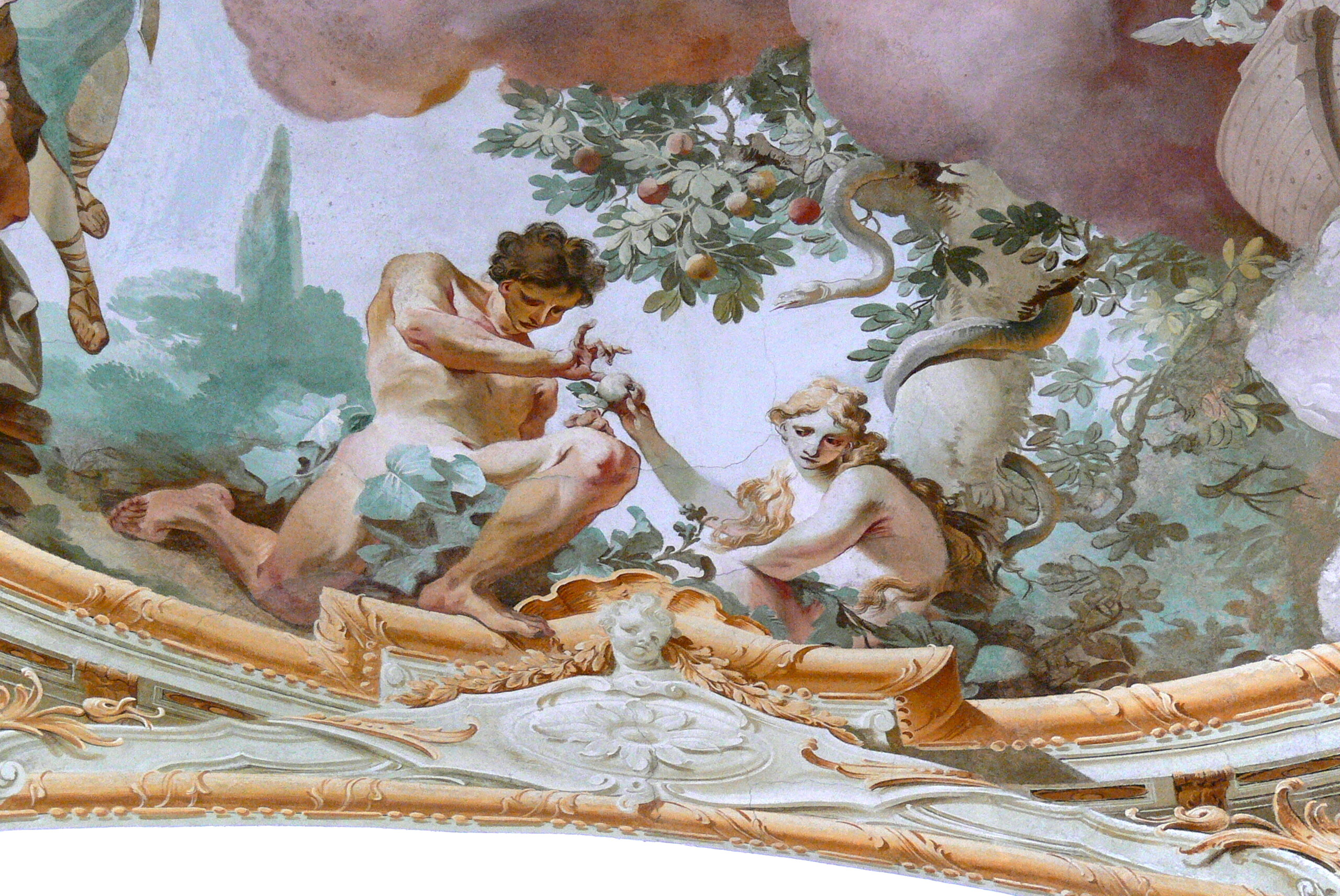
Adam and Eve

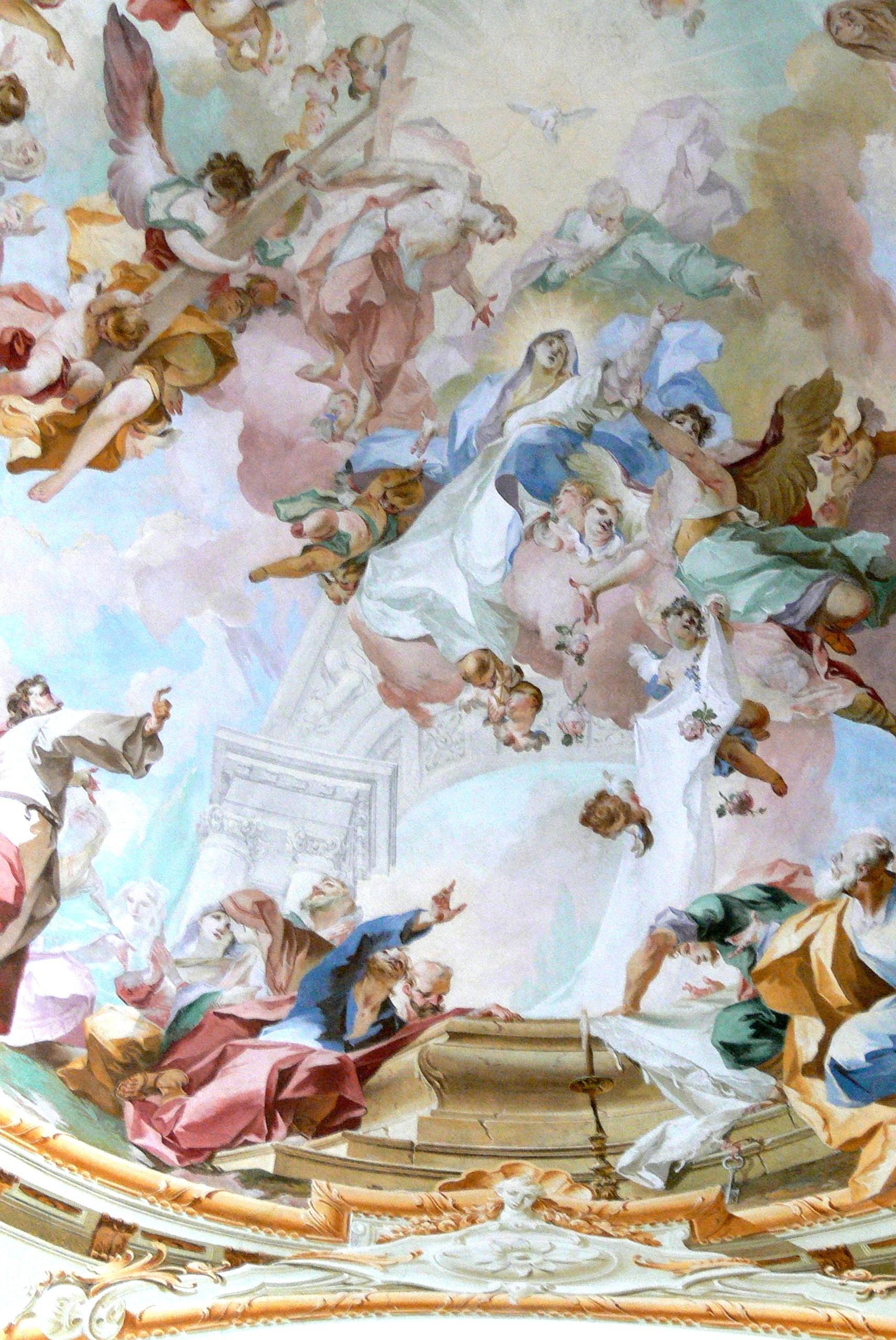
Assumption of Mary

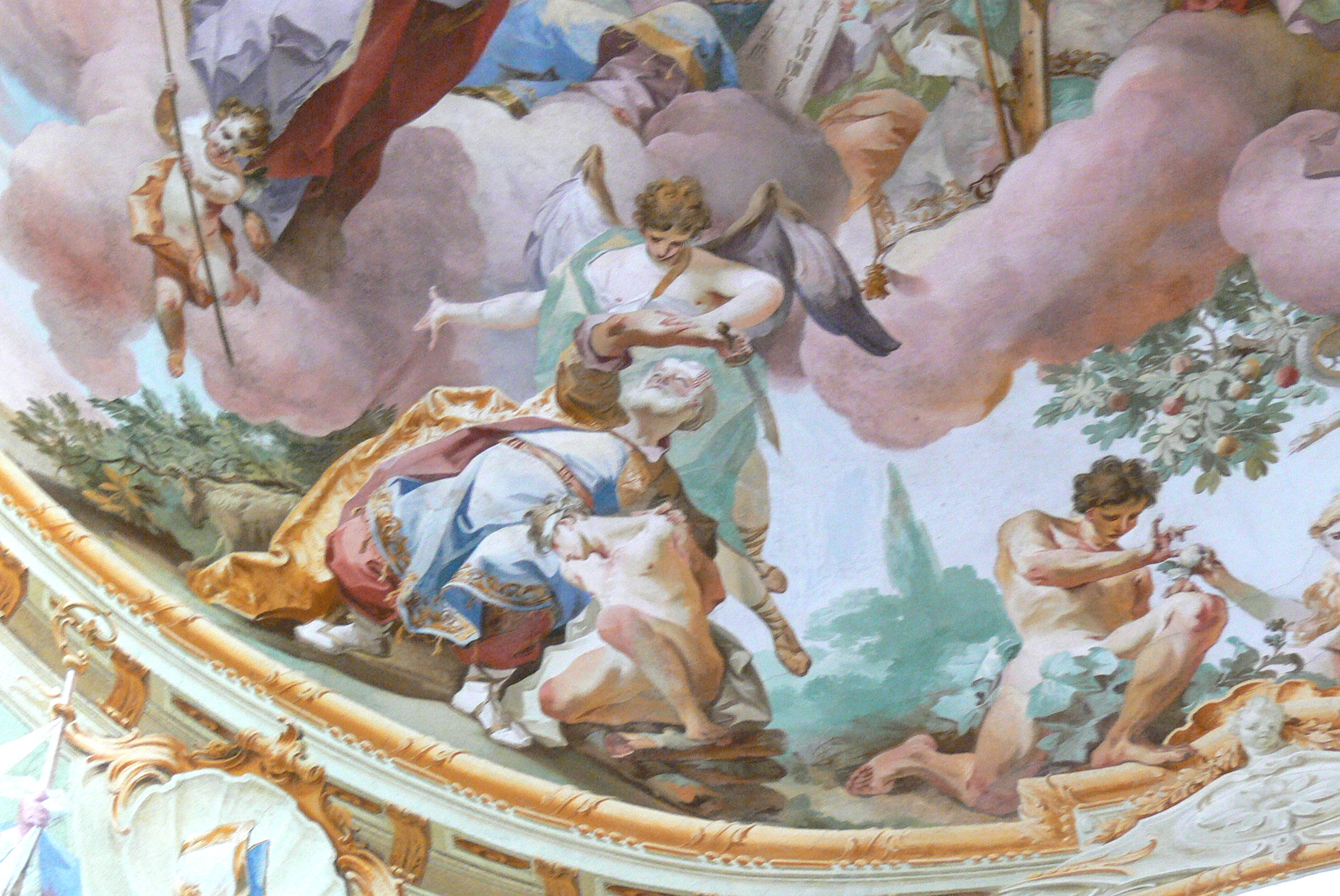
Sacrifice of Isaac

=== Frescoes on other domes ===
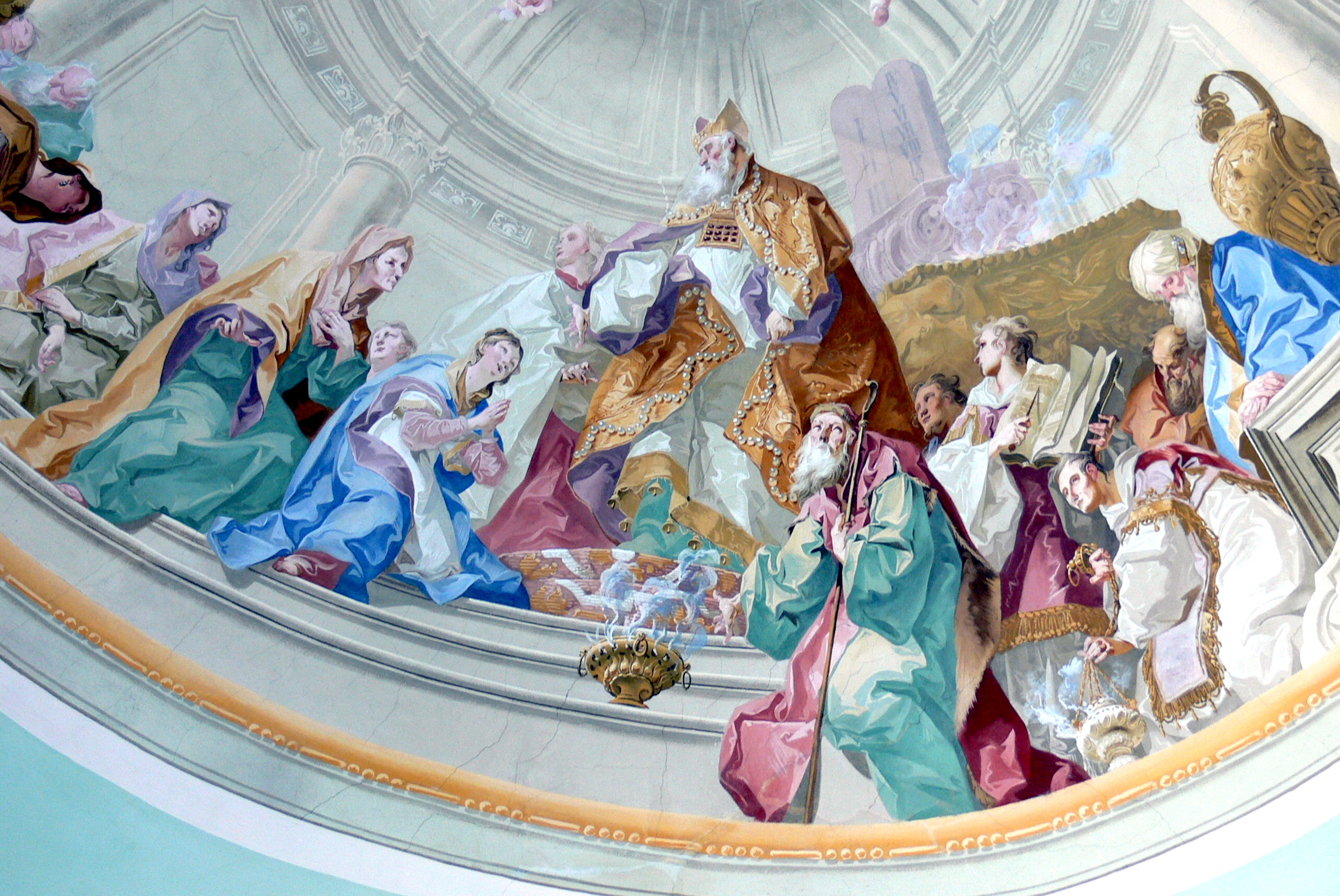
Presentation of Mary at the Temple

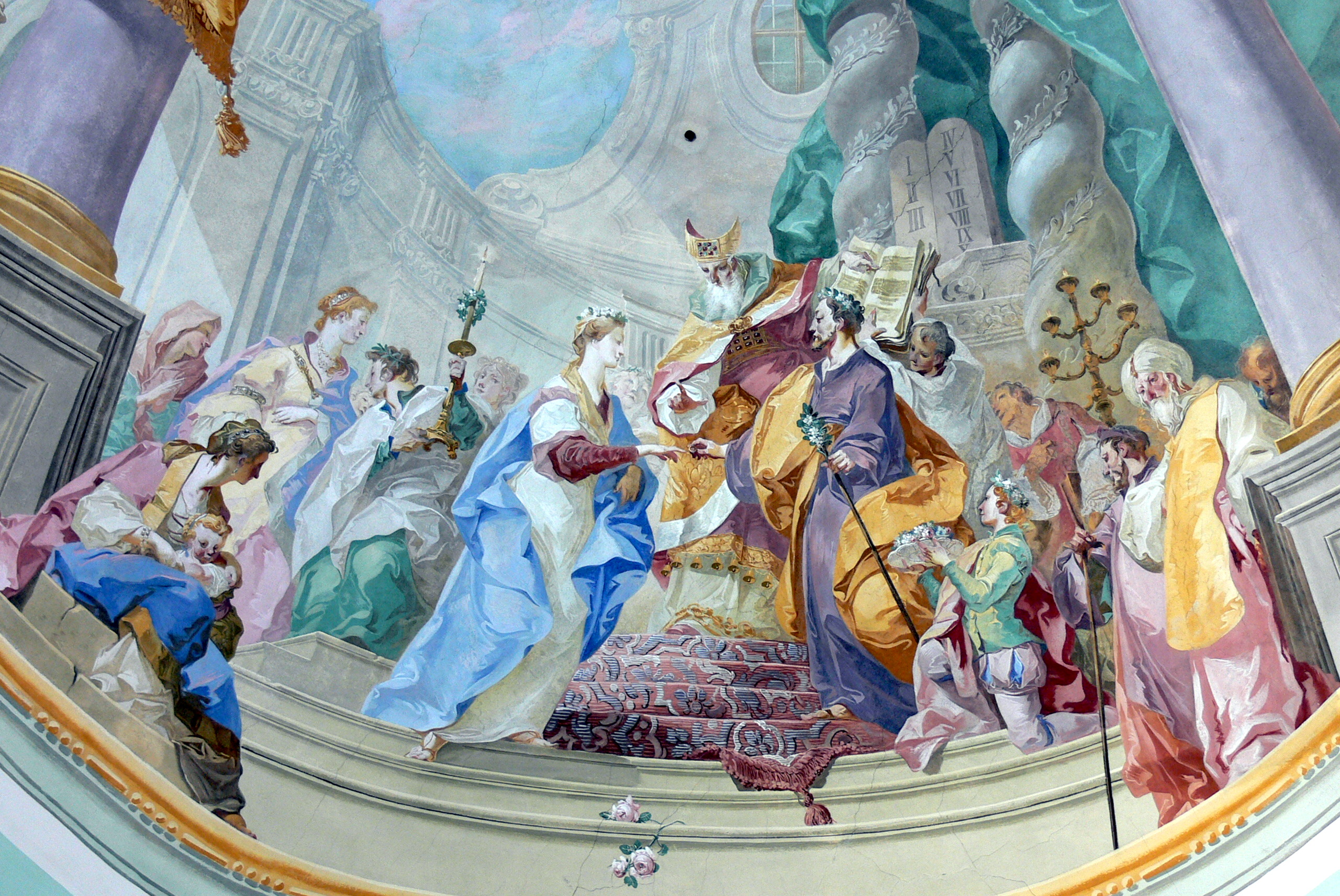
Marriage of the Virgin Mary

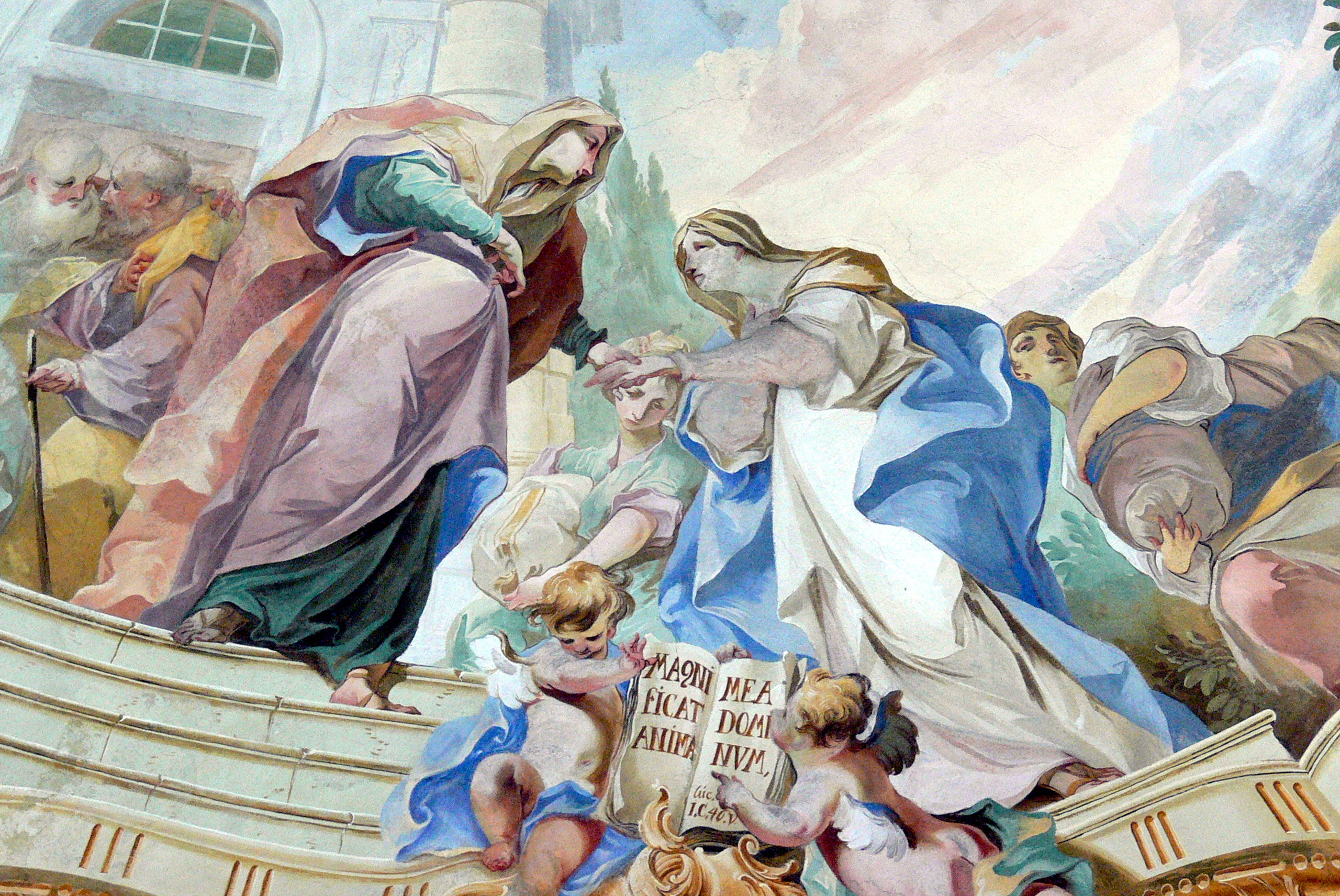
Visitation of Mary

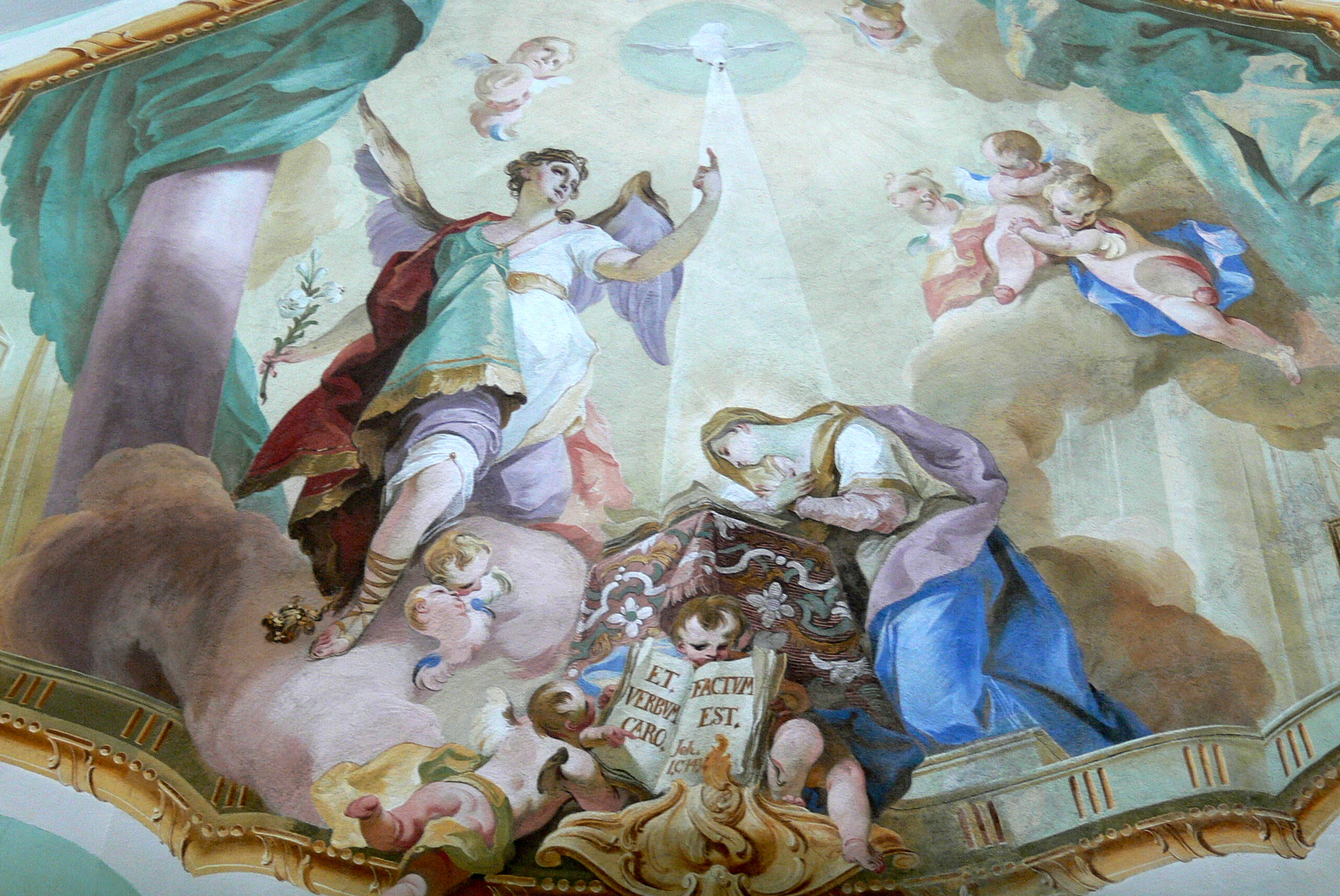
The Annunciation

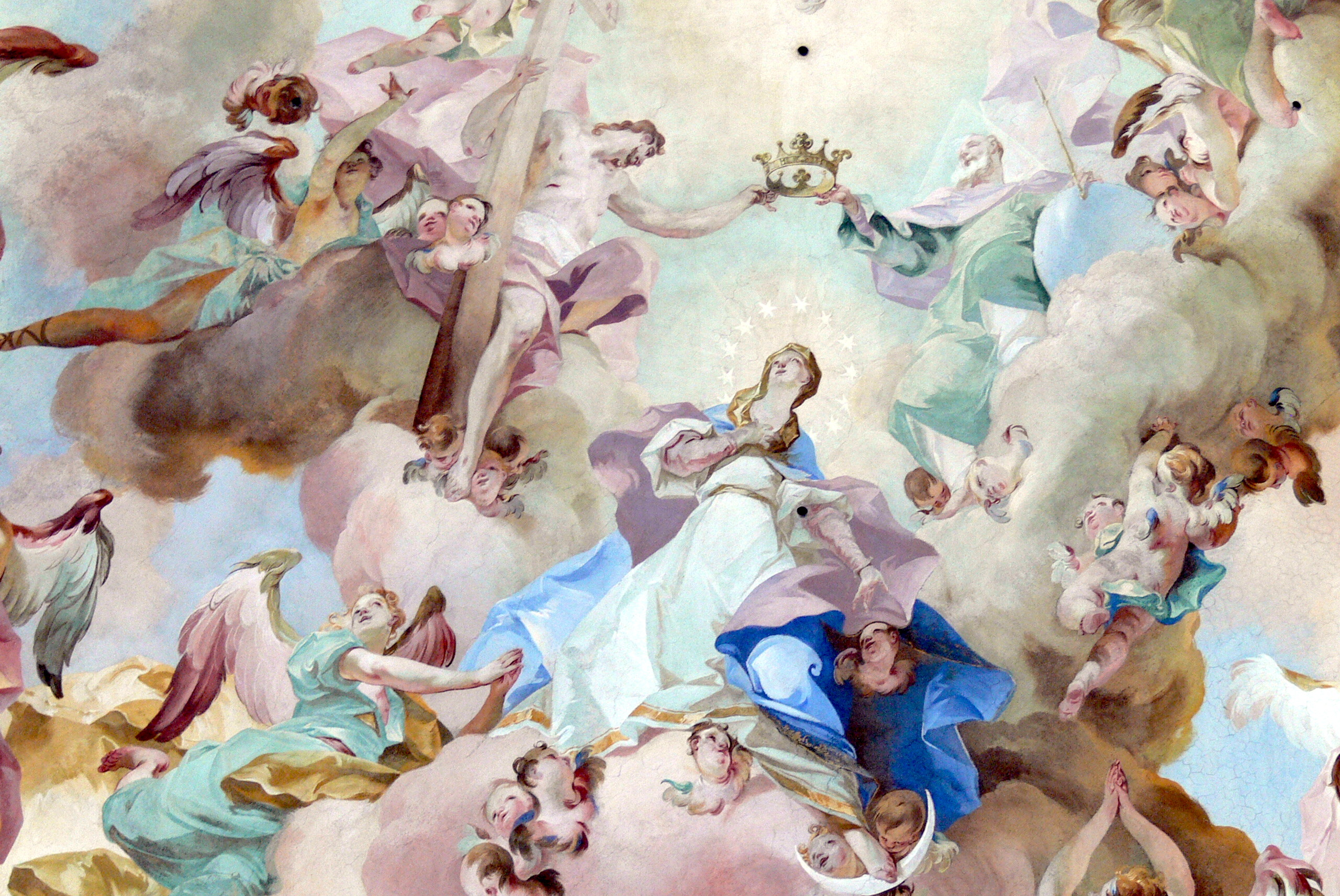
Coronation of Mary

=== Frescoes on walls of the church ===
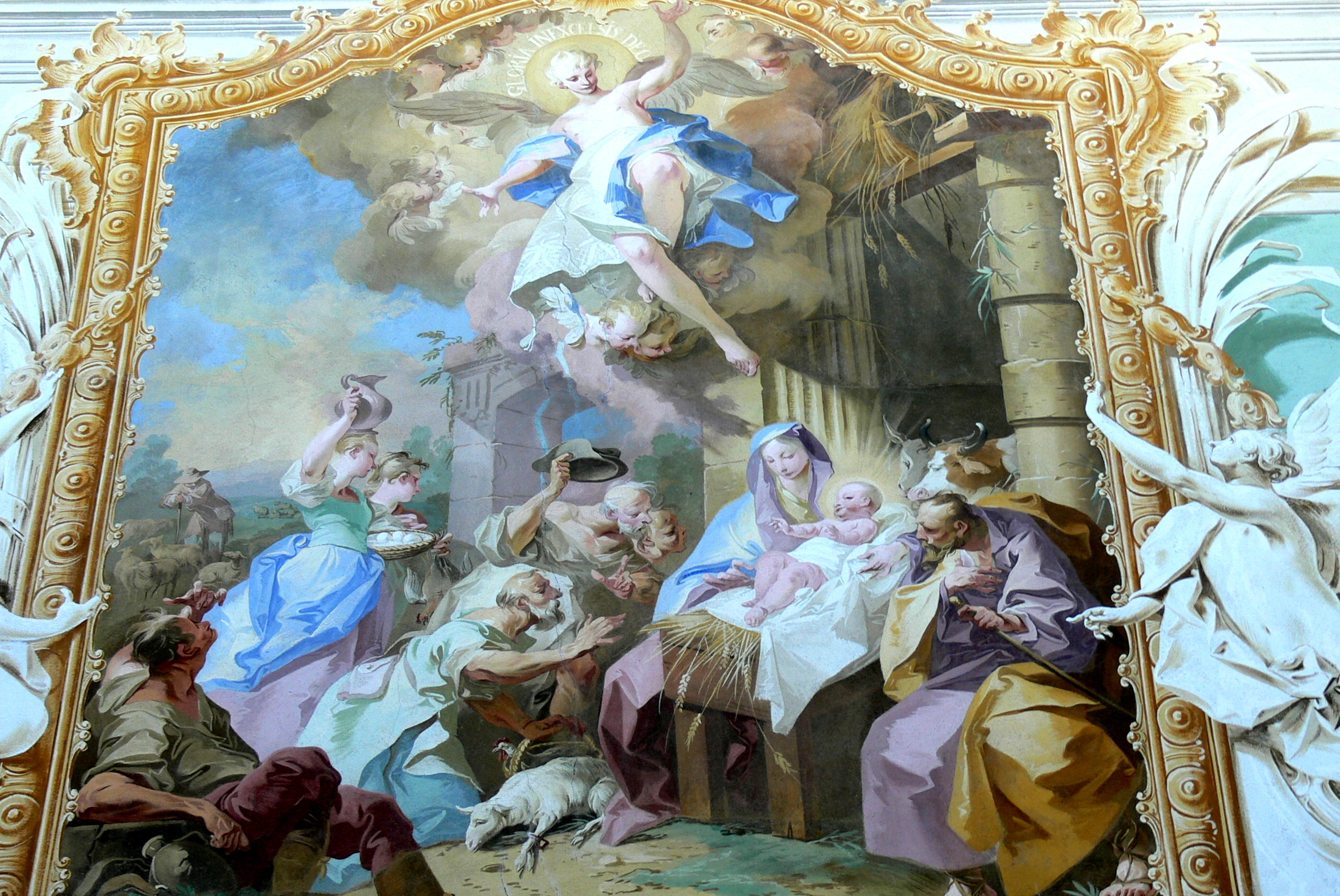
Adoration of the Shepherds

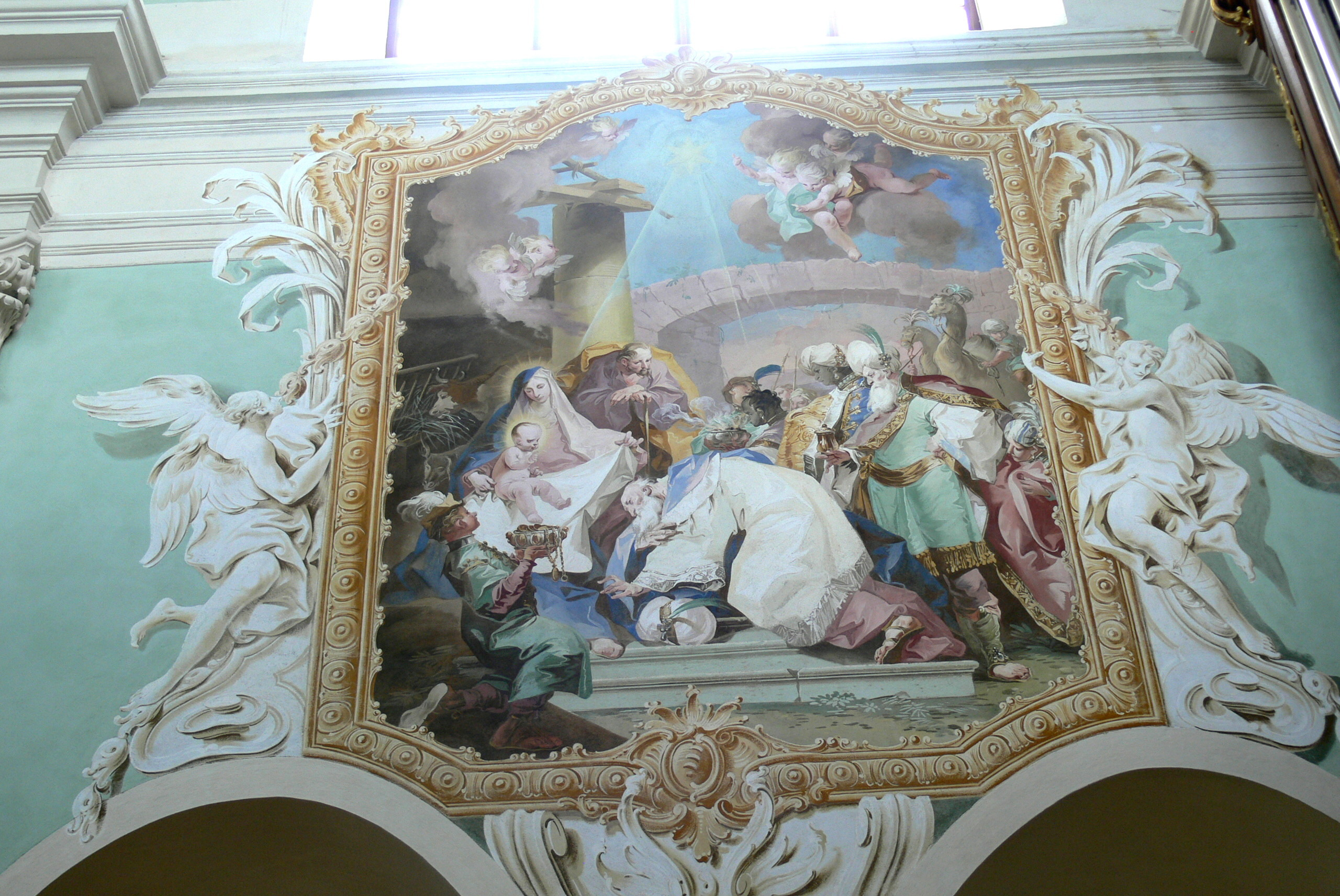
Adoration of the Magi

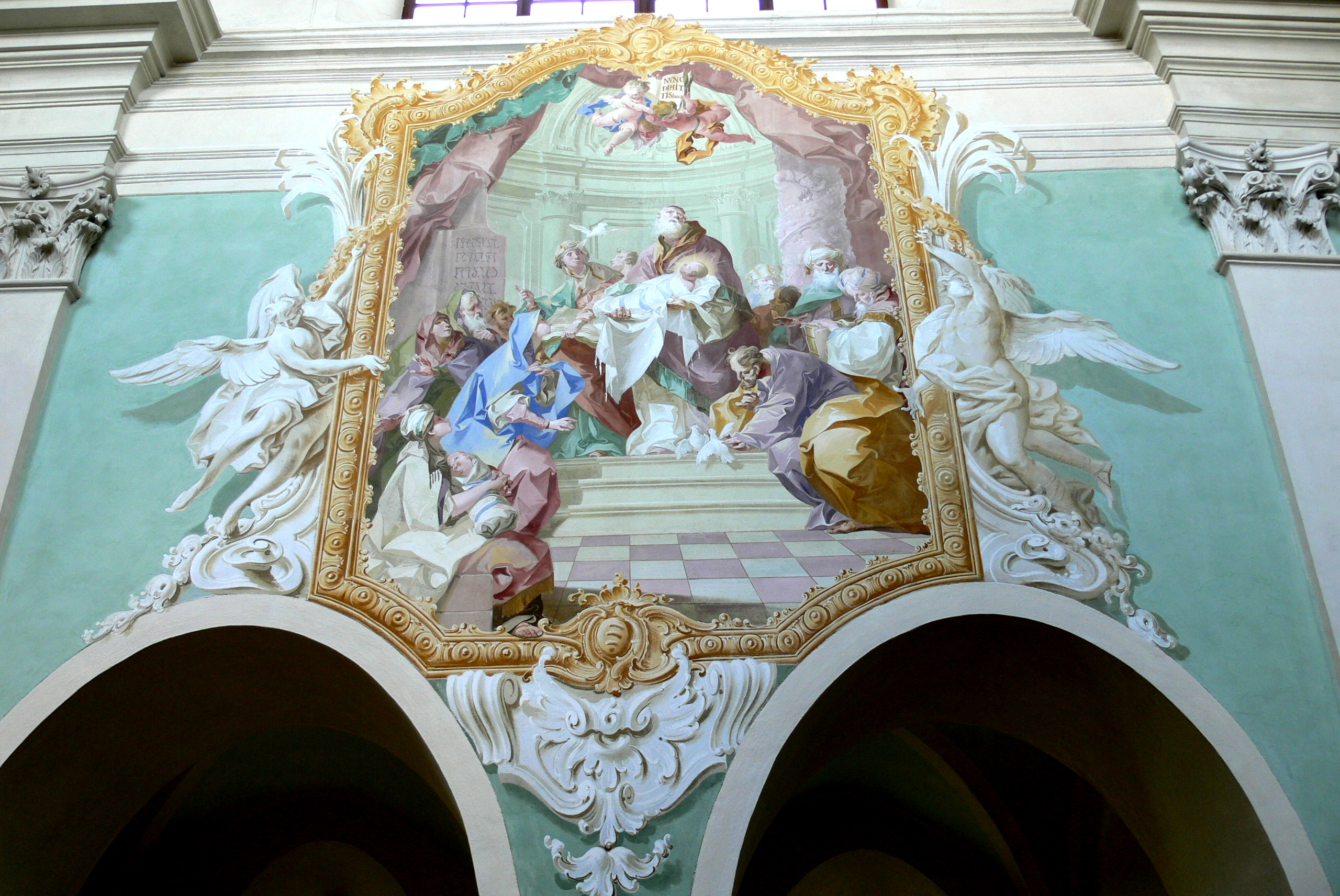
Presentation of Jesus at the Temple

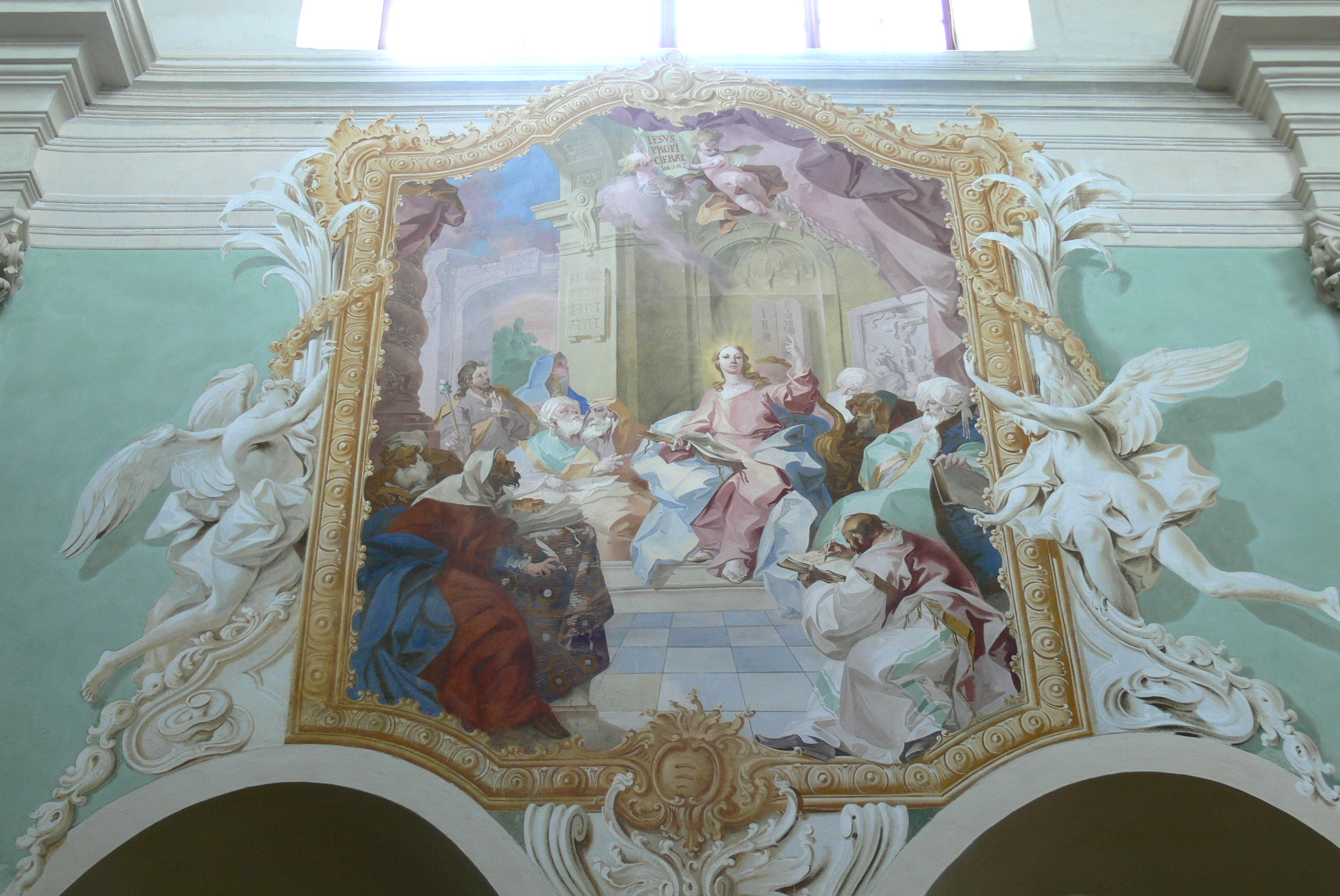
Jesus amongst the Doctors

== Gallery ==
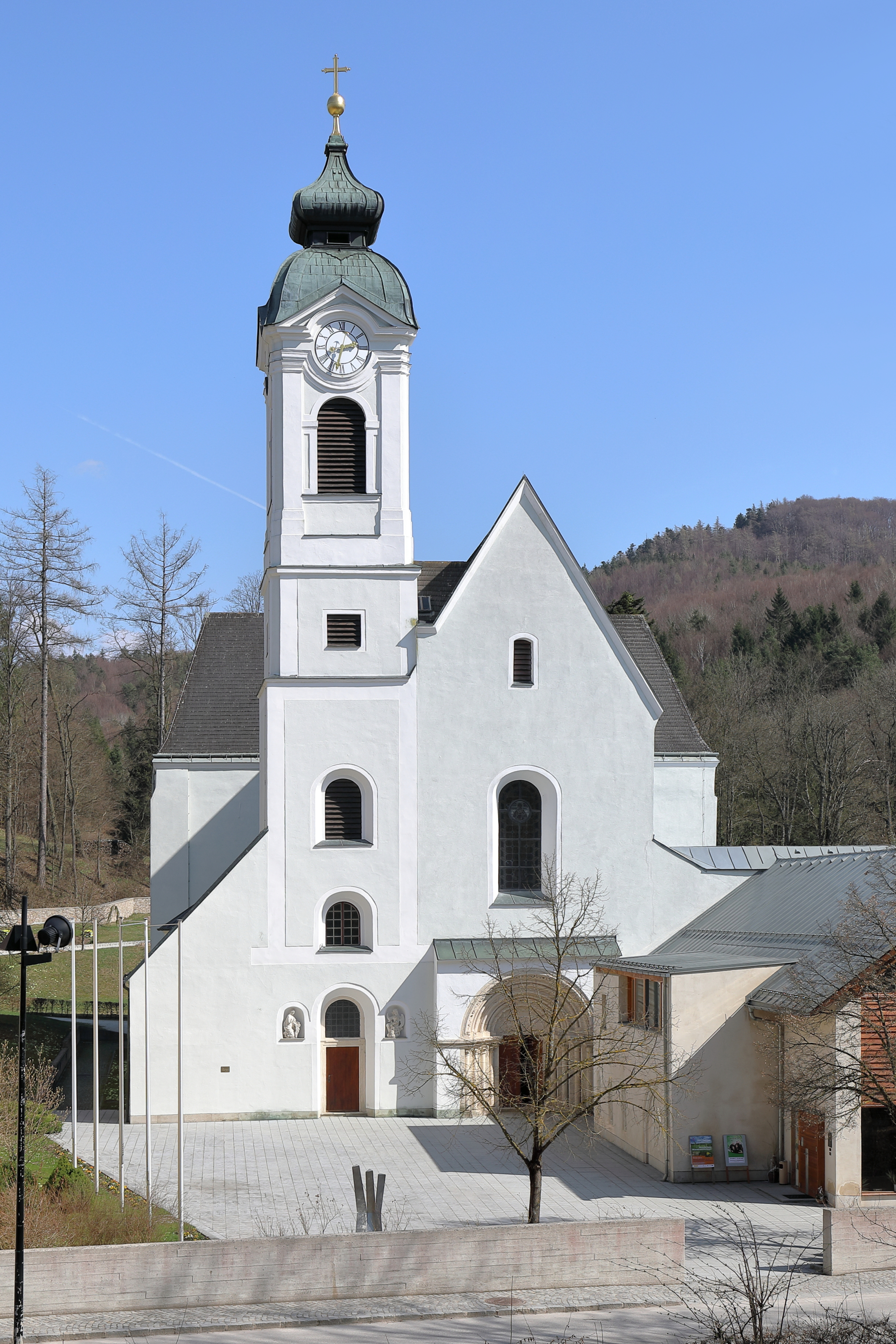
Courtyard of the Basilica

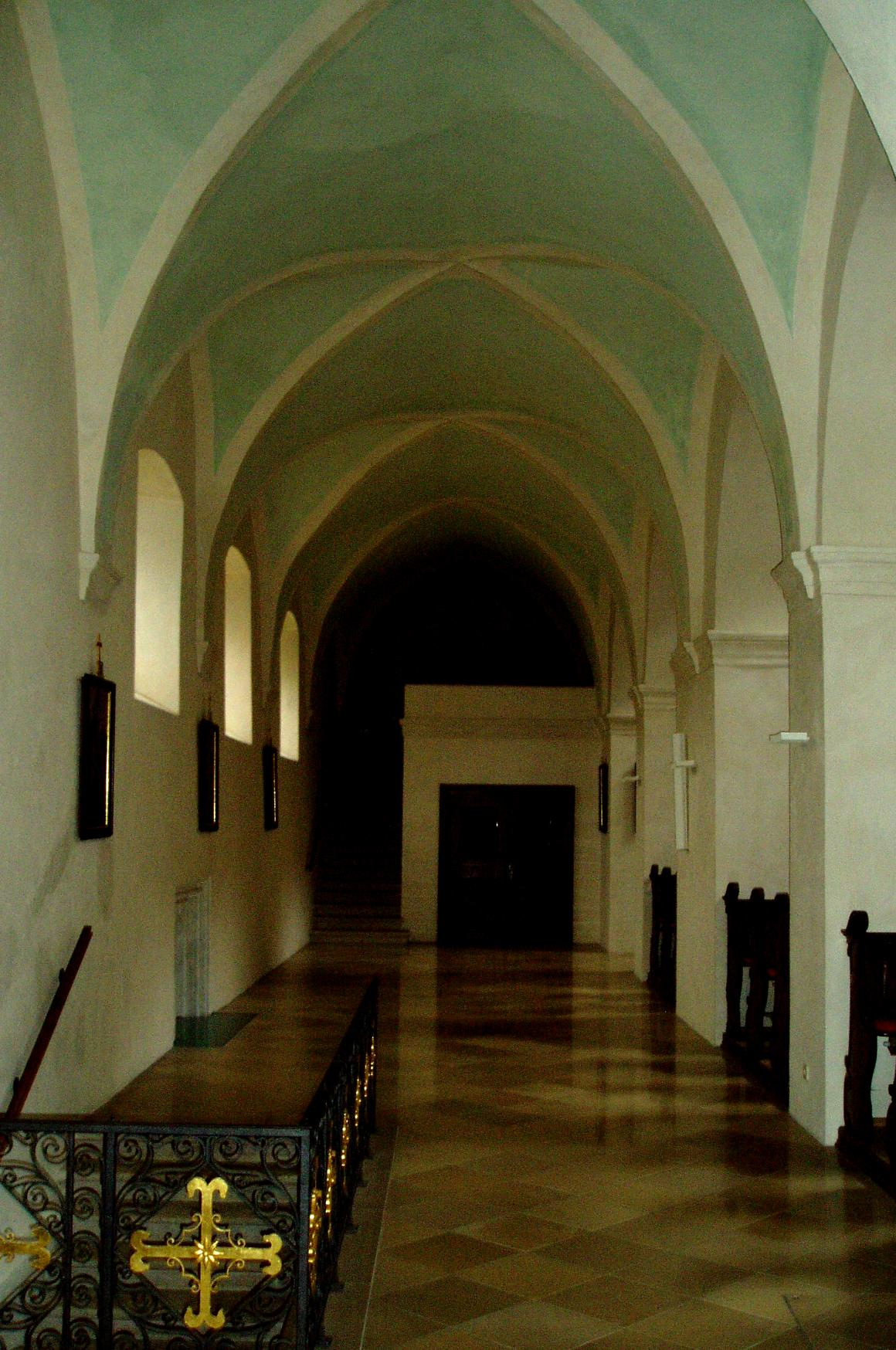
Cloister

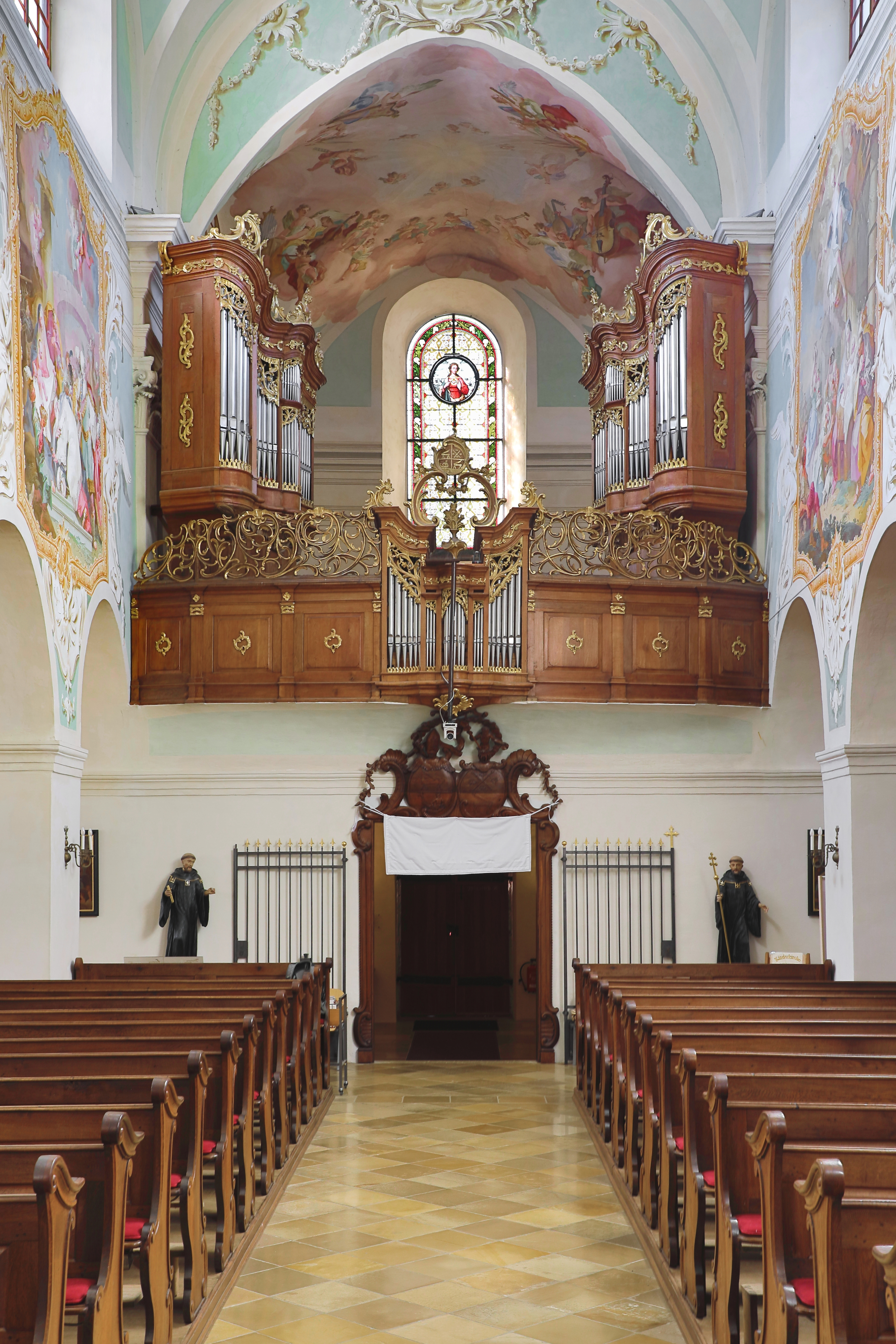
Organ and entrance
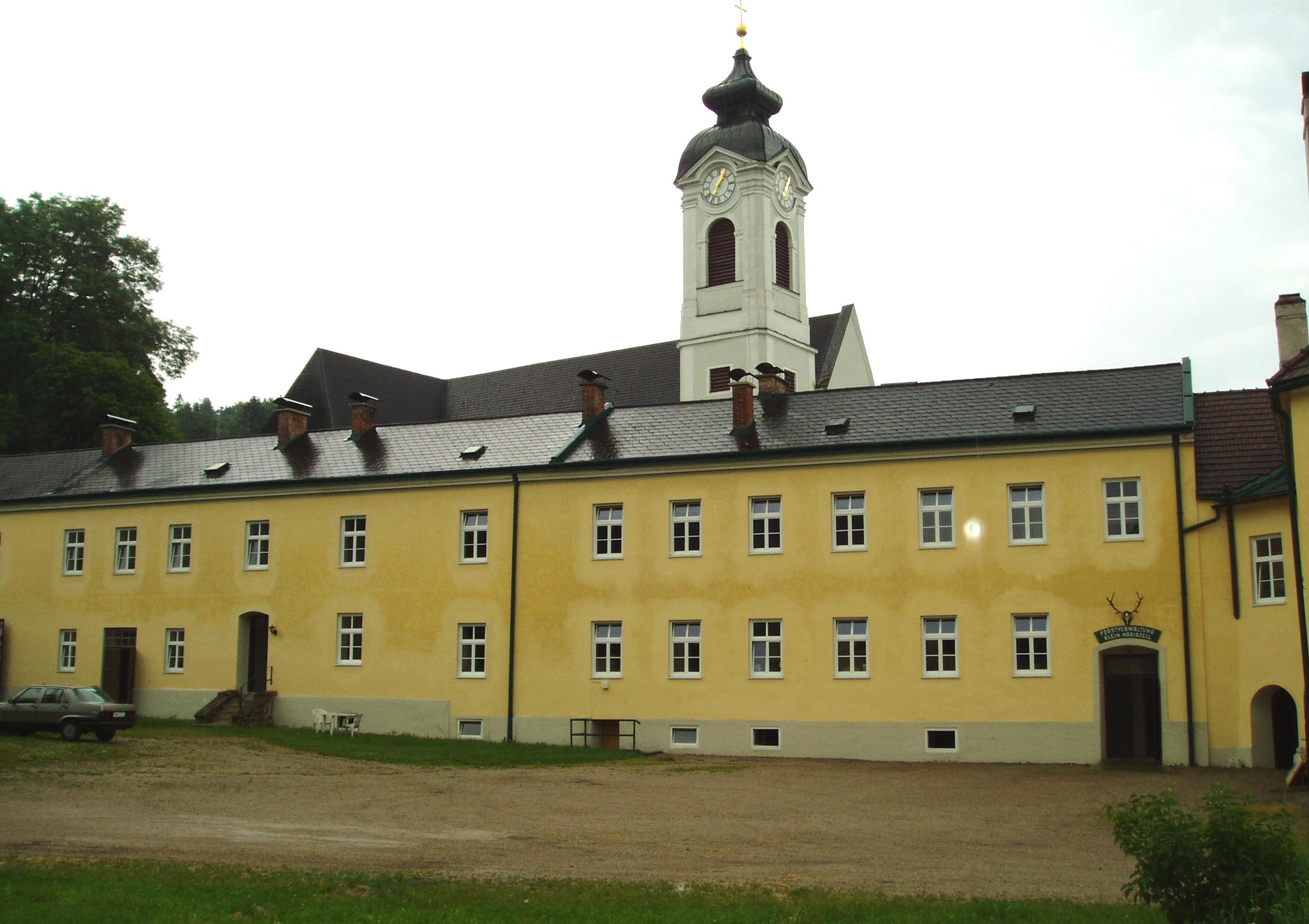
Forestry administration

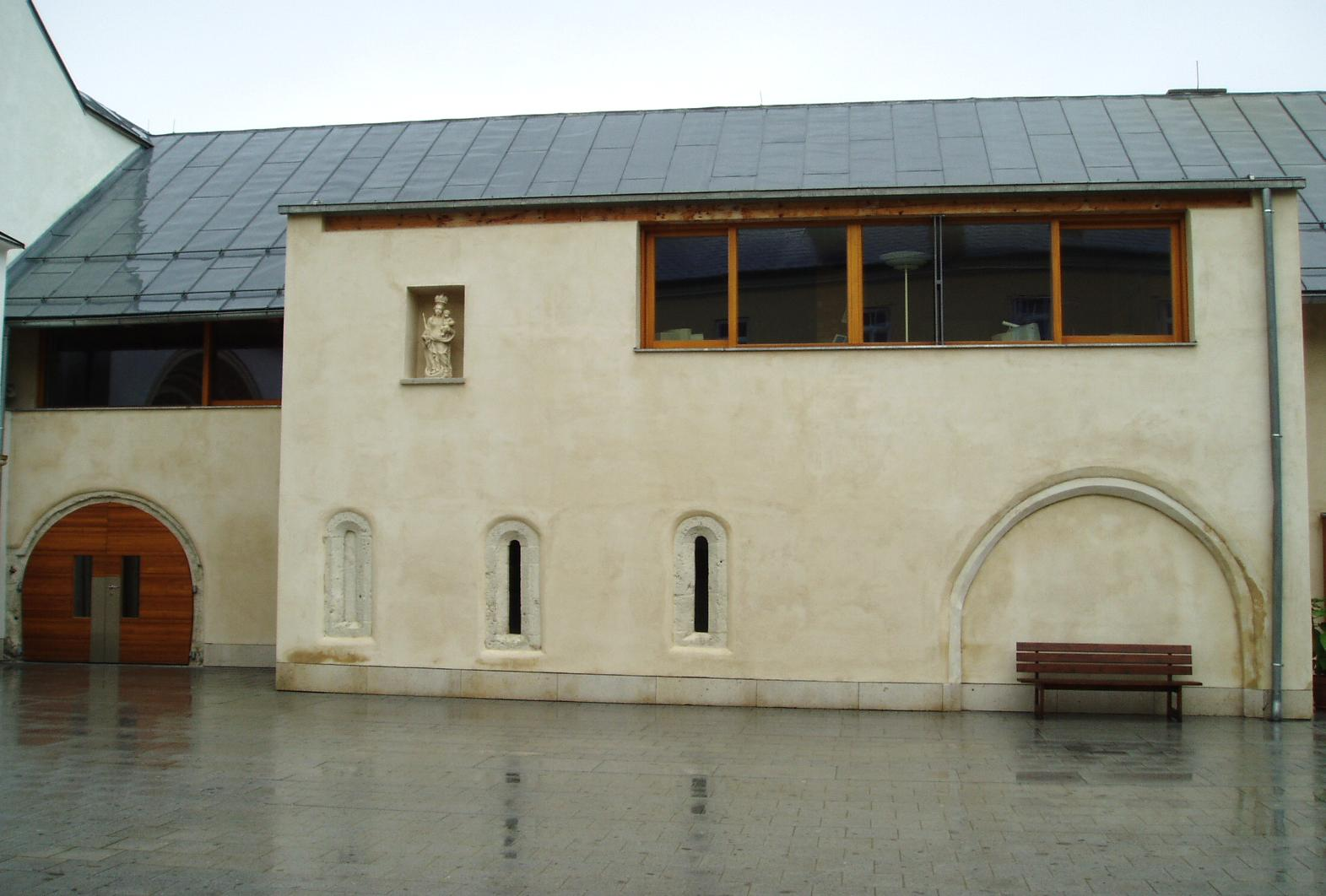
Renovated inner courtyard

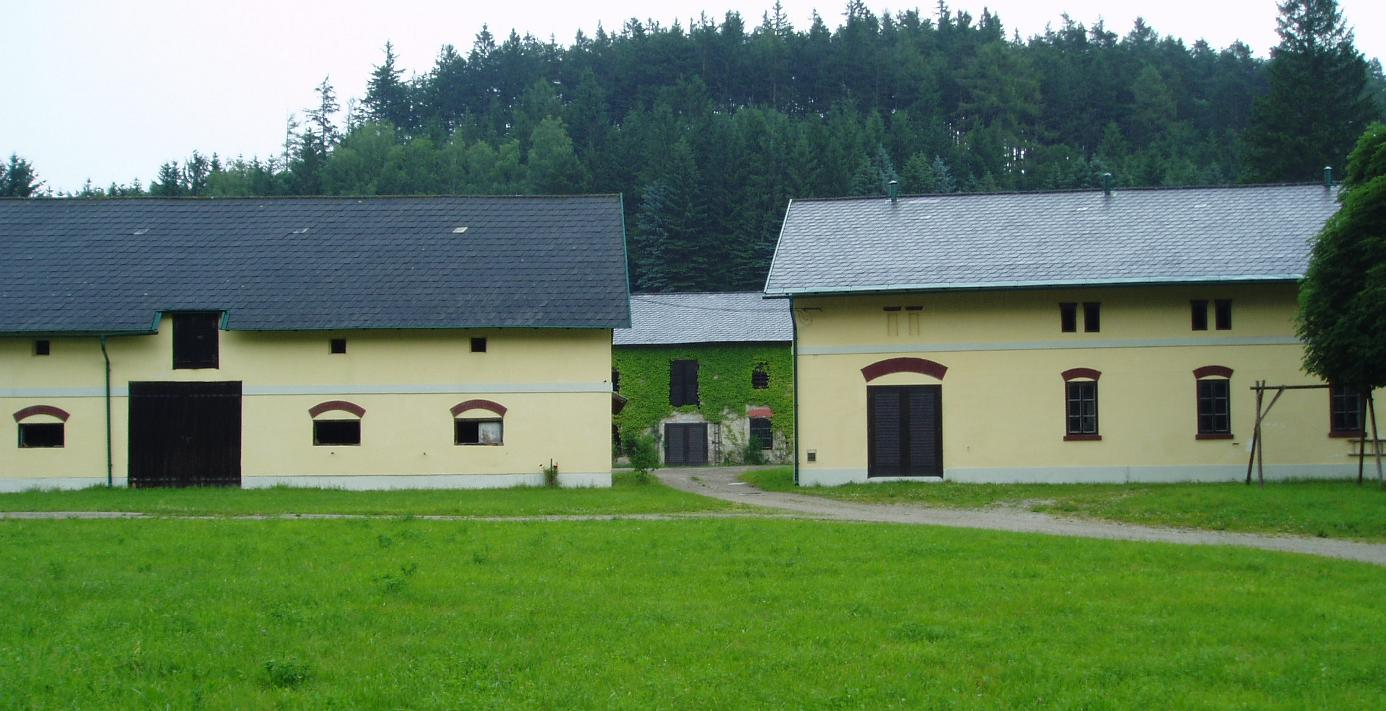
Outbuilding
