= Andreas Schnider =

Austrian politician (born 1959)

- Born: 3 December 1959 (age 65); Graz, Styria, Austria
- Education: Akademisches Gymnasium; Graz University; Vienna University
- Occupations: Theologian; Publisher; Consultant; Party leader; Academic teacher
- Organizations: Diocese of Graz-Seckau; Manumedia Schnider Verlag; Austrian People's Party; Bundesrat; Benedict XVI Philosophical-Theological University

Andreas Schnider (born 3 December 1959) is an Austrian theologian, academic teacher, author, publisher, consultant and politician of the Austrian People's Party (ÖVP). He was the leader of the party's regional section Steirische Volkspartei in Styria from 2001 to 2010, and a member of the Bundesrat from 2002 to 2010.

Schnider founded the Manumedia Schnider Verlag publishing house in 1989 which he later expanded to consulting functions. He has been professor at the Benedict XVI Philosophical-Theological University in Heiligenkreuz since 2006.

== Education ==
Born in Graz, Schnider attended the primary school of Sacré Coeur Graz from 1966 and then the Akademisches Gymnasium until 1978. He studied theology at the Karl Franzens University in Graz, graduating as Mag. theol. in 1982. He received his doctorate in theology in 1985. In 1996, he habilitated at the Catholic Faculty of the Vienna University.

== Teaching ==
From 1982 to 1989, Schnider worked as a religion teacher at various grammar schools in Graz. From 1983 to 1989, he was also employed as a university assistant at the Institute for Catechetics and Religious Education at the Graz University. From 1989 to 2001, he was head of the Religious Education Institute ("Religionspädagogisches Institut") of the Diocese of Graz-Seckau. He has been professor for religious education and catechetics as well as for the university course in religious education at the Benedict XVI Philosophical-Theological University in Heiligenkreuz since 2006. He is active as a lecturer at various tertiary educational institutions. From 2009 onwards, he worked in an advisory capacity for federal ministries, for both Education, the Arts and Culture, and for Science and Research, serving as chair of the preparatory group for a new pedagogical education ("PädagogInnenbildung Neu") in 2010/11, and further as chair of the development council for it until 2013. Subsequently, he was elected for a five-year term as chair of the new "Qualitätssicherungsrat für Pädagogen- und Pädagoginnenbildung" (QSR), supervising the quality of the education of pedagogues.

== Publishing and consulting company ==
In 1989, Schnider founded the publishing house Manumedia Schnider Verlag, which he expanded in 2001 to "Dr. Schnider's OG" for consulting, publishing and coaching, and further to "dr. schnider's eu" in 2005. Schnider is author, editor and publisher of numerous books.

== Politics ==
Schnider was in politics from 2001 to 2010. In January 2001, former provincial governor Waltraud Klasnic appointed him as provincial secretary of the Steirische Volkspartei in Graz, a post he held until 2006. In this function he not only advocated the possibility of marriage between homosexuals, but also demanded the right of child adoption for them. From 17 December 2002 Schnider also became a member of the Federal Council in the Austrian Parliament in Vienna, succeeding Fritz Grillitsch. He held this position until October 2010. After the 2005 Styrian state election, Schnider was sworn in as a member of the Landtag Steiermark on 25 October 2005, but resigned his Landtag mandate after the election to the Bundesrat on 27 October. Schnider was also president of the Austrian Academic Association (Österreichischer Akademikerbund) from 2010.

== Private life ==
Schnider is the father of three children and lives in Vienna and Graz.
