= Hanna-Barbara Gerl-Falkovitz =

German professor and Catholic philosopher (born 1945)

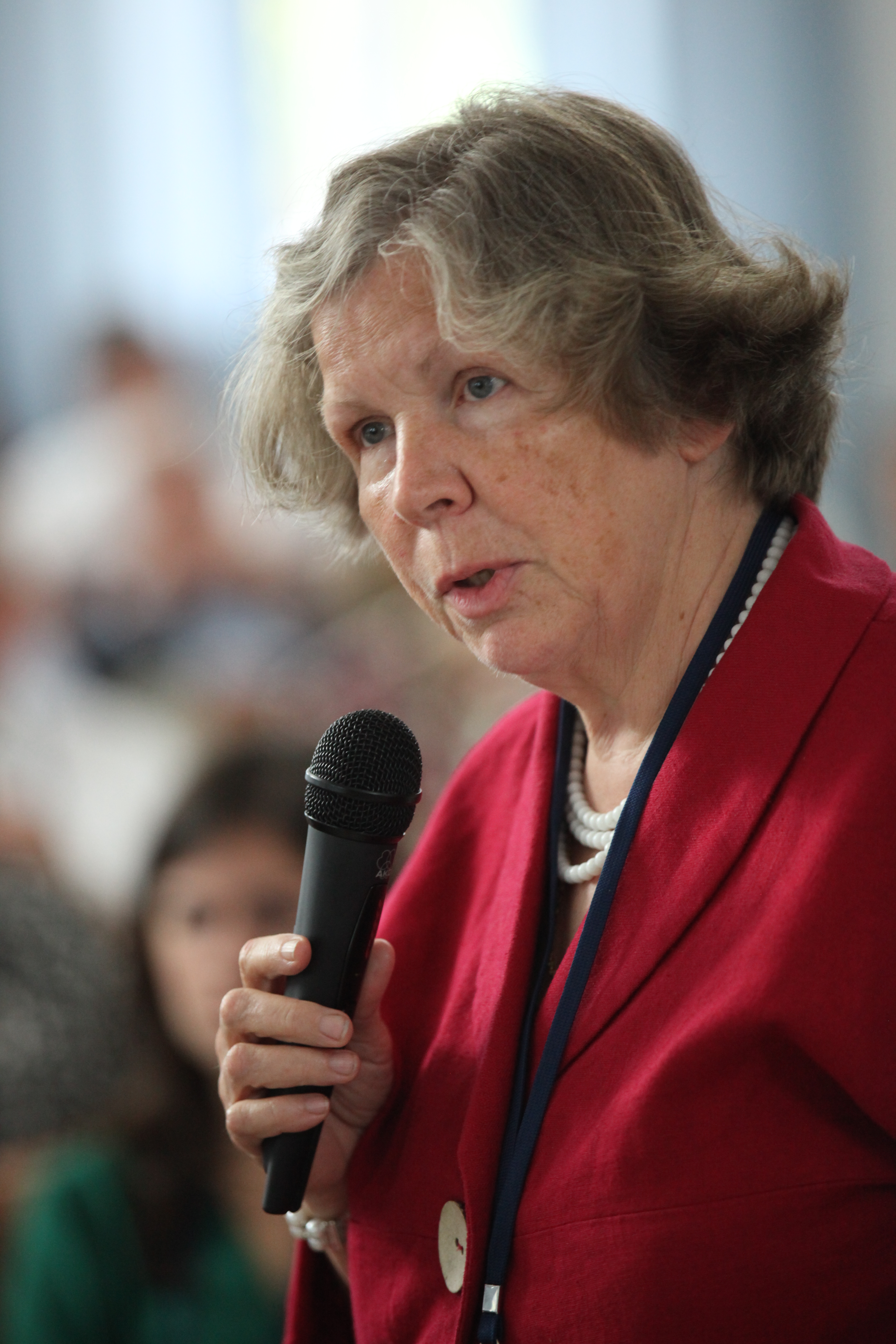
- Gerl-Falkovitz speaking in Vienna
- Born: 23 November 1945 (age 80); Oberwappenöst, Tirschenreuth, Germany
- Education: LMU Munich; Heidelberg University
- Occupations: Author; professor; philosopher
- Employer: Pope Benedict XVI Philosophical-Theological University
- Spouse: Hans-Bernhard Wuermeling (m. 1995; died 2019)
- Awards: Ratzinger Prize; Order of St. Sylvester

Hanna-Barbara Gerl-Falkovitz (born 23 November 1945) is a German Catholic philosopher, professor and author. She studies Catholic religious philosophy of the 19th and 20th centuries.

== Biography ==
=== Education ===
Gerl-Falkovitz studied philosophy, German Studies, and political science at LMU Munich and Heidelberg University from 1965 to 1971; she earned her doctorate from LMU Munich in 1971. In an interview in 2021, she said of this formative period in her life, "The theology of the 1960s, when I was studying in Munich, was not attractive for me: too much historical criticism, also in methodology, too much existentialism." By contrast, she explained, "In philosophy I learned to see the structures and objective orders of thinking and of the world, the contradictions of atheism, the senselessness of denying the truth. Also, the deep meaning of the objective world, that is much more than a construction of the human mind."

While Gerl-Falkovitz was the Director of Studies at Burg Rothenfels am Main from 1975 to 1984, she earned her habilitation from LMU Munich in 1979, submitting a monograph on the theologian Romano Guardini.

=== Career ===
From 1993 to 2011, Gerl-Falkovitz held the chair for Religious Philosophy and Comparative Religious Studies at the Dresden University of Technology. She gained considerable popularity at a university struggling with its Communist past by offering courses and lectures on Christian notions of reconciliation and forgiveness.

Since 2011, she has been Director of the European Institute for Philosophy and Religion (EUPHRat) at the Pope Benedict XVI Philosophical-Theological University in Heiligenkreuz, Austria.

She is one of the editors of the 29-volume German edition of the collected works Romano Guardini and one of the editors of the 27-volume German edition of the collected works of Edith Stein (Edith Stein Gesamtausgabe, Verlag Herder). She is widely considered to be an expert on Ida Friederike Görres, and is the founder and vice president of the Gertrud von le Fort Society.

She was a delegate to the Synodal Way process of the Catholic Church in Germany. On February 22, 2023 – Ash Wednesday – she and three others resigned as delegates. In a statement, the four expressed concern about the "direction and the conduct" of the Synodal Way, and they said that it was “casting doubt on central Catholic doctrines and beliefs.”

Interviews with Gerl-Falkovitz appear frequently in German-language media; she is a frequent public speaker.

=== Personal life ===
Hanna-Barbara Gerl-Falkovitz was married to Hans-Bernhard Wuermeling, a coroner, from 1995 until his death in 2019.

== Views ==
In her writings and numerous public appearances, Gerl-Falkovitz has often defended traditional Catholic teaching on marriage. She is opposed to abortion and has studied the philosophical background of the mentality that favors contraception and abortion.

In 2019, Gerl-Falkovitz was one of over 200 professors worldwide who signed an open letter to the leaders of the Pontifical John Paul II Institute expressing "great concern" following the removal of Livio Melina and José Noriega from the Institute.

She supports the Catholic teaching that ordination to the priesthood is for men only. In 2022, she criticized the German Synodal Way's call for women's ordination.

== Awards ==
Gerl-Falkovitz has received many awards for her work, including:

- 2019: Josef Pieper Prize from the Josef Pieper Foundation
- 2020: Edith Stein Prize of the Polish Edith Stein Society and the Edith Stein House (Dom Edyty Stein) in Wroclaw, Poland
- 2021: Augustin Bea Prize from the Humanum Foundation
- 2021: Ratzinger Prize from the Ratzinger Foundation
- 2022: Pontifical Order of St. Sylvester

== Works ==
=== Selected works on Catholic figures and theological topics ===
- Gerl-Falkovitz, Hanna (1985). Romano Guardini, 1885–1968 : Leben und Werk (in German). Mainz: Matthias-Grünewald-Verlag. ISBN 3-7867-1146-1. OCLC 12440856.
- Gerl-Falkovitz, Hanna-Barbara (1994). Freundinnen christliche Frauen aus zwei Jahrtausenden (in German). München. ISBN 978-3-7904-0623-8. OCLC 75484994.
- Beckmann, Beate; Gerl-Falkovitz, Hanna (2003). Edith Stein : Themen, Bezüge, Dokumente. Würzburg: Königshausen & Neumann. ISBN 3-8260-2476-1. OCLC 53241061.
- Gerl-Falkovitz, Hanna-Barbara; TOPOS PLUS (2017). Romano Guardini Konturen des Lebens und Spuren des Denkens (in German). Kevelaer. ISBN 978-3-8367-1097-8. OCLC 974493638.
- Gerl-Falkovitz, Hanna-Barbara; TOPOS PLUS (2016). Frau - Männin - Menschin zwischen Feminismus und Gender (in German). Kevelaer. ISBN 978-3-8367-1056-5. OCLC 934152867.
- Gerl-Falkovitz, Hanna-Barbara (2016). Maria: der andere Anfang (in German). Heiligenkreuz im Wienerwald. ISBN 978-3-903118-13-3. OCLC 973210807.
- Gerl-Falkovitz, Hanna-Barbara (2019). Geheimnis des Lebendigen : Versuche zu Romano Guardini (in German). Heiligenkreuz im Wienerwald, Austria. ISBN 978-3-903118-85-0. OCLC 1141764313.

=== Volumes by Ida Friederike Görres, edited by Gerl-Falkovitz ===
- Görres, Ida Friederike (2004). Der Geopferte : ein anderer Blick auf John Henry Newman (in German). Vallendar-Schönstatt: Patris Verlag. ISBN 3-87620-261-2. OCLC 60116557.
- Görres, Ida Friederike (2015). "Wirklich die neue Phönixgestalt?" : über Kirche und Konzil : unbekannte Briefe 1962-1971 von Ida Friederike Görres an Paulus Gordan (in German). Heiligenkreuz im Wienerwald: Be & Be. ISBN 978-3-902694-70-6. OCLC 944432309.

=== Gerl-Falkovitz in English translation ===
- Gerl-Falkovitz, Hanna-Barbara; Bryson, Jennifer S. (2020). ""Only the Lover Discerns": A Brief Introduction to Ida Friederike Görres". Logos: A Journal of Catholic Thought and Culture. 23 (4). Project Muse: 117–122. doi:10.1353/log.2020.0033. ISSN 1533-791X. S2CID 240910889.
- Gerl-Falkovitz, Hanna-Barbara (23 June 2022). "The Other Side of Revelation". Plough.
