= Benedict XVI Philosophical-Theological University =

Private Catholic pontifical university in Heiligenkreuz, Austria

Pope Benedict XVI Philosophical-Theological University
- Philosophisch-Theologische Hochschule Benedikt XVI. Heiligenkreuz
- Latin: Philosophica-Theologica Universitatis Benedictus XVI
- Former name: Institutum Theologicum
- Type: Pontifical university
- Established: 1802; 224 years ago
- Parent institution: Heiligenkreuz Abbey
- Affiliations: Roman Catholic; Cistercian
- Chancellor: Maximilian Heim, OCist
- Rector: Wolfgang Klausnitzer
- Dean: Rupert Stadler (studies)
- Students: 345 (2022./2023.)
- Location: Heiligenkreuz, Lower Austria, Austria
- Language: German
- Website: Official website

The Pope Benedict XVI Philosophical-Theological University (German: Philosophisch-Theologische Hochschule Benedikt XVI. Heiligenkreuz), colloquially referred to as Hochschule Heiligenkreuz, is a private, Roman Catholic pontifical university located in Heiligenkreuz, Austria. Founded in 1802 by the Cistercian monks of Heiligenkreuz Abbey as a seminary, for much of the 19th century, the college remained very small, with less than 20 seminarians and several Cistercian instructors. During the late 19th century and 20th century, the college's profile grew, and more students arrived, made up of Cistercians, as well as diocesan and religious seminarians. In 1976 Hochschule Heiligenkreuz earned college status. In 2007 Pope Benedict XVI named Heiligenkreuz a pontifical university and Karl Wallner, OCist, became its first rector. In 2013 its library was gifted Benediktbeuern's 265.000 volume book collection.

The university's campus is located in a group of buildings at Heiligenkreuz Abbey, sharing space with the monastery and a seminary. As of 2016, the university enrolled 295 students, including 43 Cistercians, 40 from other religious institutes, and 75 diocesan seminarians, the rest being lay men and women.

Hochschule Heiligenkreuz is the only university administered by the Cistercian Order and the largest educational institution for priests and religious people in the German-speaking part of the world.

== History ==
=== Beginnings ===
Theological education has been present at Heiligenkreuz Abbey since the Middle Ages. Since 1802, a state-accredited and Church-recognized institution of higher education has operated, originally organized as a seminary to train Cistercian priests from the Zwettl, Heiligenkreuz, Neukloster, and Lilienfeld abbeys, all located in Lower Austria.

For much of the 19th century, the college remained small, with enrollment never more than 20. In the late 19th century, thanks to both political as well as economic changes, the college grew in prestige and influence. Instead of having to teach from state-approved curriculum, the Cistercian professors enjoyed more intellectual independence. In addition, the professors would now receive degrees from universities in Vienna, Austria, Tübingen, Germany, and Rome. Despite these changes, enrollment remained low.

=== 20th-century growth ===
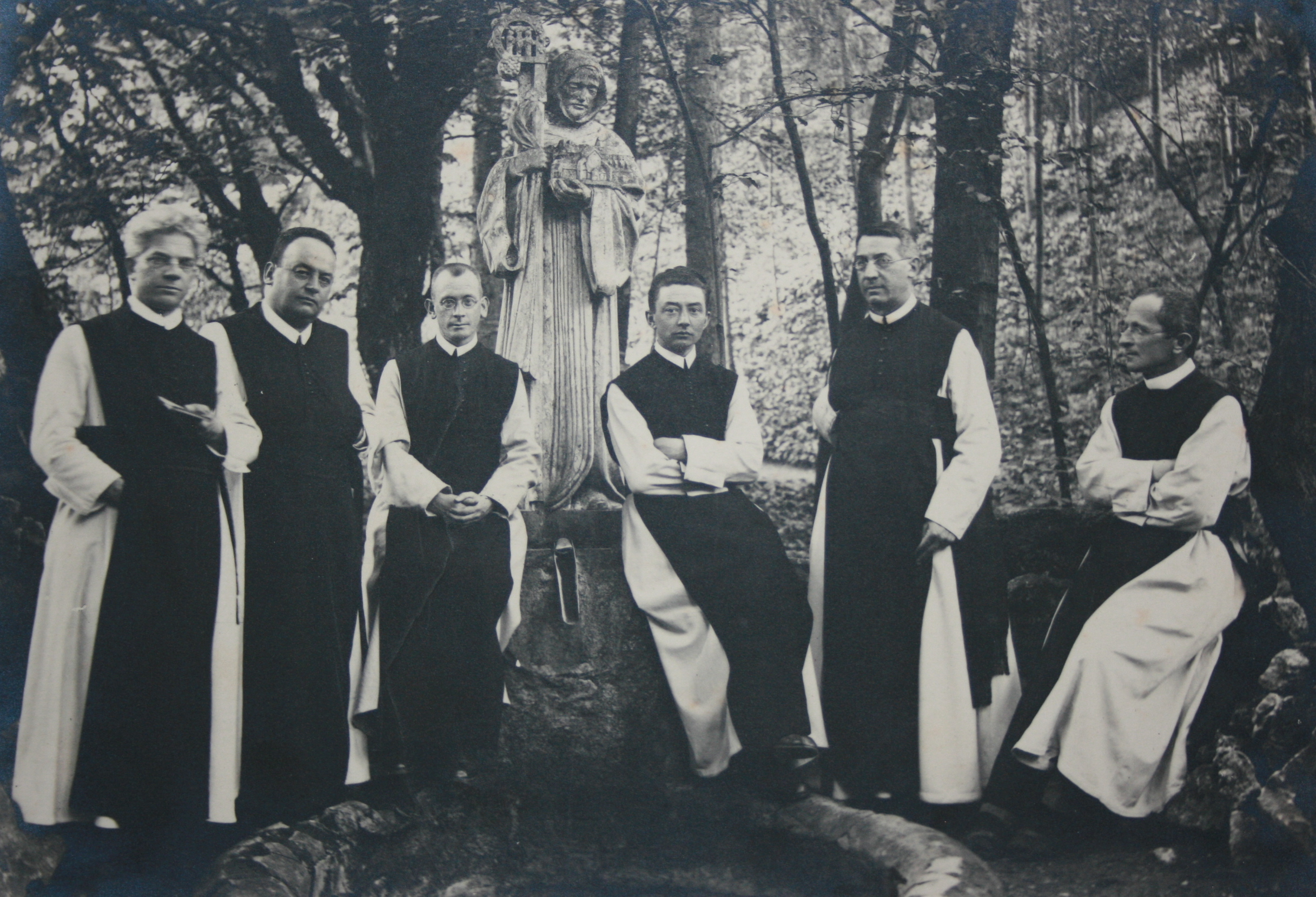
University faculty in 1930

After Vatican II, enrollment grew rapidly after the college, then known by its Latin name, Institutum Theologicum, came to the attention of the Bishop of Regensburg, Rudolf Graber. He wanted his seminarians to experience life in a religious community before coming diocesan priests, so he sent them to Heiligenkreuz. Soon, other bishops and leaders of other religious orders began sending their own seminarians to be educated there. By 1976, as the college was offering graduate degrees and opening enrollment to lay students, it was granted university status by the Austrian government.

=== Recent history ===
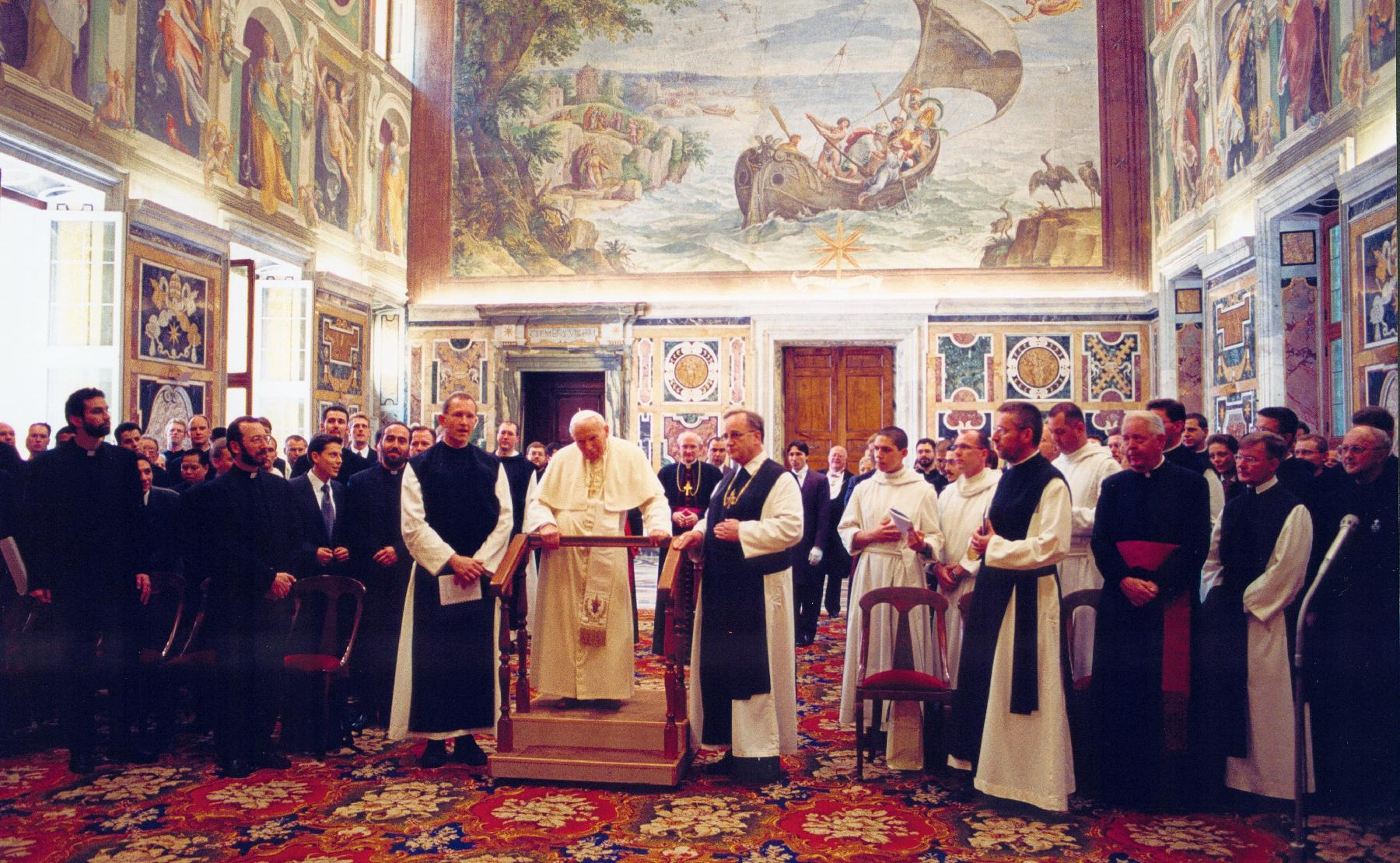
University faculty and students meeting with Pope John Paul II in 2002

In May 2002, professors and students made a trip to Rome, where they were received in a papal audience by Pope John Paul II.

In 2007, Pope Benedict XVI visited the university. On 28 January, the feast day of St. Thomas Aquinas, Benedict raised the college to the rank of pontifical university. He praised the university for its combination of theology and spirituality and described it as a "prominent place of study".

== Campus ==
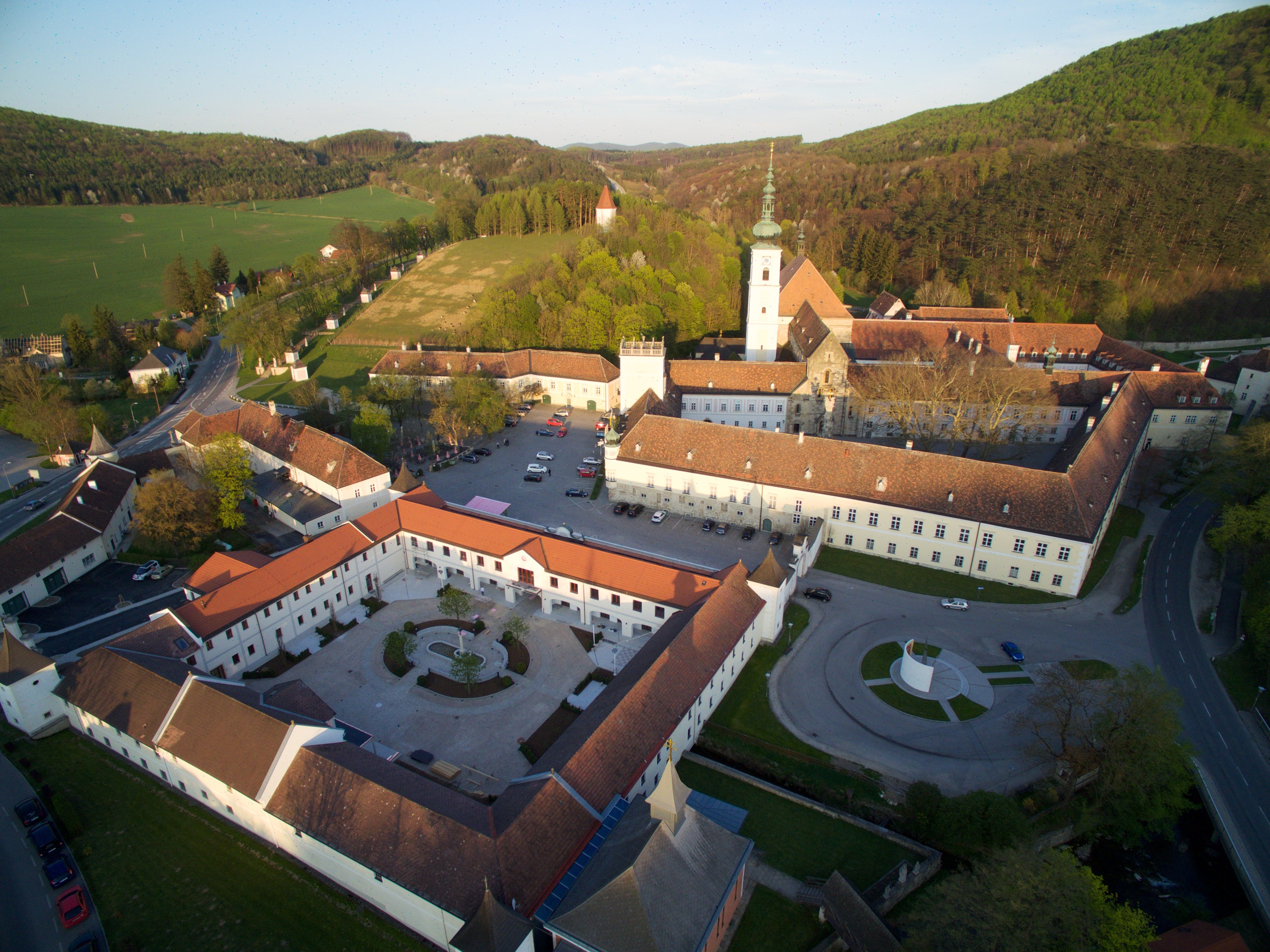
Aerial view of the campus, with university buildings in the forefront and Heiligenkreuz Abbey in the background.

The university is located in Heiligenkreuz, Lower Austria, Austria, in a complex of buildings located on the Heiligenkreuz Abbey property.

== Administration and organization ==
The grand chancellor of the university is the abbot of Heiligenkreuz Abbey. The current abbot and chancellor is Maximillian Heim, OCist, since 2011. The rector is the de facto leader of the university, with more day-to-day involvement in administration. The current rector is Wolfgang Klausnitzer. The vice rector as well as much of the teaching body are Cistercians from Heiligenkreuz Abbey.

The university is organized into twelve 'institutes' or departments. They are as follows:

#	Institute	Director
1	Institute of Philosophy	Marian Gruber, OCist
2	Institute of Ethics and Social Sciences	Herbert Pribyl
3	Institute of Biblical Studies	Michael Ernst
4	Institute of Church History and Canon Law	Alfred E. Hierold
5	Institute of Pastoral Theology and Religious Education	Norbert Stigler, OCist
6	Institute of Moral Theology	Kosmas Thielmann, OCist
7	Institute of Spiritual Theology and Religious Studies	Wolfgang Buchmüller, OCist
8	Institute of Liturgical Science and Church Music	Bernhard Vošicky, OCist
9	Institute of Dogmatics and Fundamental Theology	Karl Wallner, OCist
10	European Institute for Cistercian Research (de)	Alkuin Schachenmayr, OCist
11	European Institute of Philosophy and Religion	Hanna-Barbara Gerl-Falkovitz (de)
12	Institute of Biblical Archaeology and Biblical Travelling	Friedrich Schipper (de)

== Academics ==
=== Studium Generale ===
Studium Generale is a curriculum in which the Pope Benedict XVI University partners with the International Theological Institute in Trumau. The German/English-language curriculum, which has been offered since 2015, is a one-year course that offers an overview of philosophy, theology, ethics, economics, law, history, spirituality, and art, all centered around the Catholic intellectual tradition. Classes are split between the two institutions, with two-thirds of classes being held in Trumai and the other third in Heiligenkreuz. Students reside at the International Theological Institute campus.

== Student life ==
=== Student body ===
In the 2015–2016 academic year, the university had 295 students. Cistercian students numbered 43, students from other religious orders numbered 40, there were 75 diocesan seminarians, and the rest were lay men and women.

=== Residential life ===
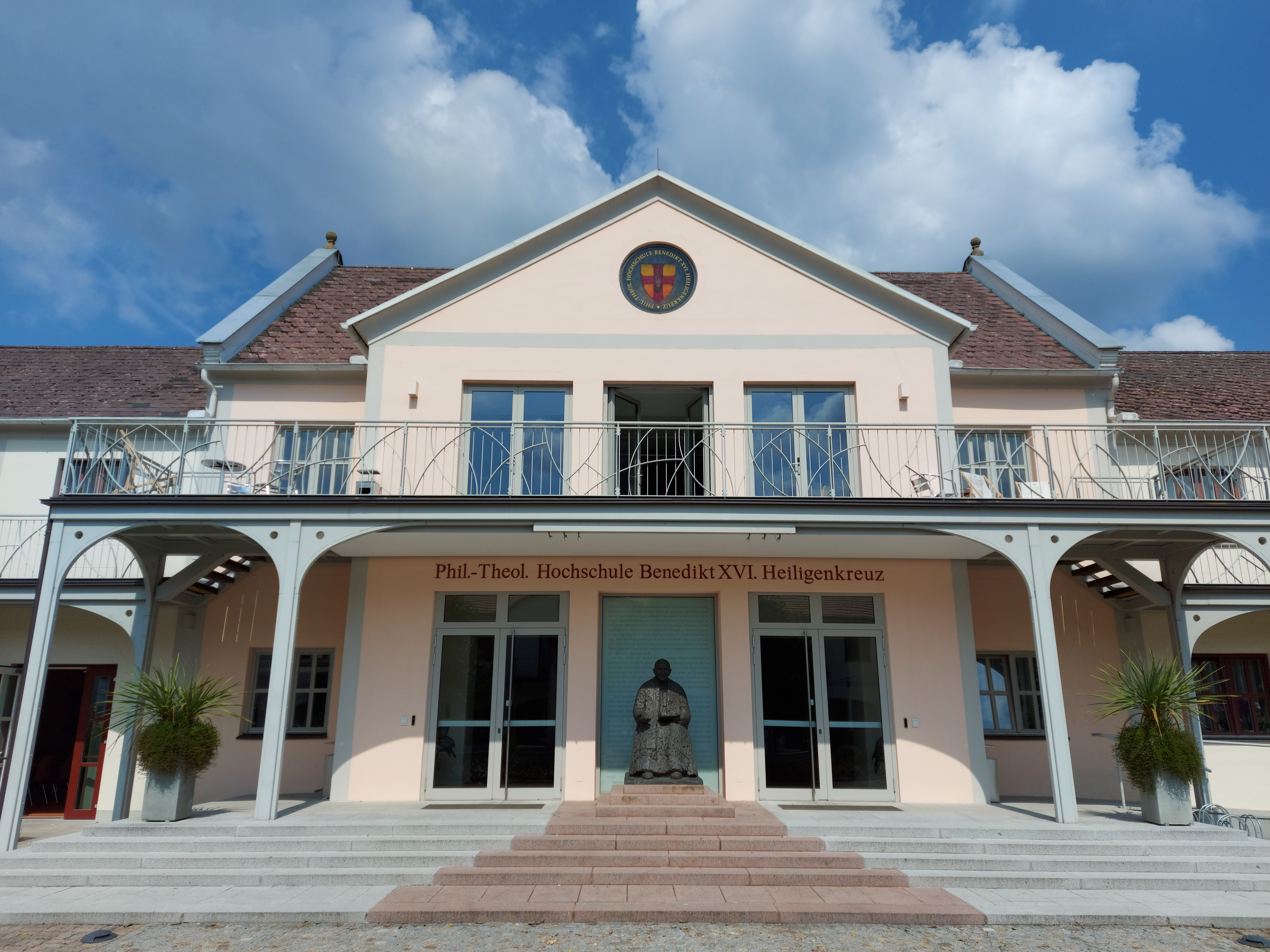
Entrance to the main building (2022)

Seminarians and students from religious orders reside in Heiligenkreuz Abbey. Other seminarians live at the Leopoldinum Seminary, also located at the monastery. The only traditional dormitory is the Pope John Paul II Student House, home to both lay and religious male students. St. Joseph of Carmel Other students, especially non-clergy students, find off-campus housing in the town of Heiligenkreuz.

== Notable people ==
=== Alumni ===
- Christian Feurstein, OCist (1983), Austrian monk and abbot of Rein Abbey
- Leopold Janauschek, OCist, Austrian monk, academic, and historian
- Jörg Lanz von Liebenfels, Austrian former monk, political and racial theorist, and occultist
- Alberich Rabensteiner, OCist, Austrian monk and prior who was murdered by Russian soldiers during World War II

=== Faculty ===
- Immo Eberl
- Peter Egger
- Augustinus Fenz, OCist
- Rüdiger Feulner
- Leopold Janauschek, OCist, Austrian monk, academic, and historian
- Matthäus Kurz
- Wilhelm Anton Neumann
- Gregor Pöck
- Nivard Schlögl
- Andreas Schnider
- Walter Schücker, OCist
- Alois Wiesinger

=== Chancellors ===
#	Chancellor	Term
1	Marian Reuter, OCist (de)	1802–1805
2	Nikolaus Kasche, OCist (de)	1806–1824
3	Xaver Seidemann, OCist (de)	1824–1841
4	Edmund Komáromy, OCist (de)	1841–1877
5	Abbot Vakanz, OCist	1877–1879
6	Heinrich Grünbeck, OCist (de)	1879–1902
7	Gregor Pöck, OCist (de)	1902–1945
8	Karl Braunstorfer, OCist (de)	1945–1969
9	Franz Gaumannmüller, OCist (de)	1969–1983
10	Gerhard Hradil, OCist (de)	1983–1999
11	Gregor Henckel-Donnersmarck, OCist	1999–2011
12	Maximillian Heim, OCist (de)	2011–

== See also ==
- Leopoldinum Seminary (de)
