= Via Sacra (Wienerwald) =

Coordinates: 48°03′20″N 16°07′55″E

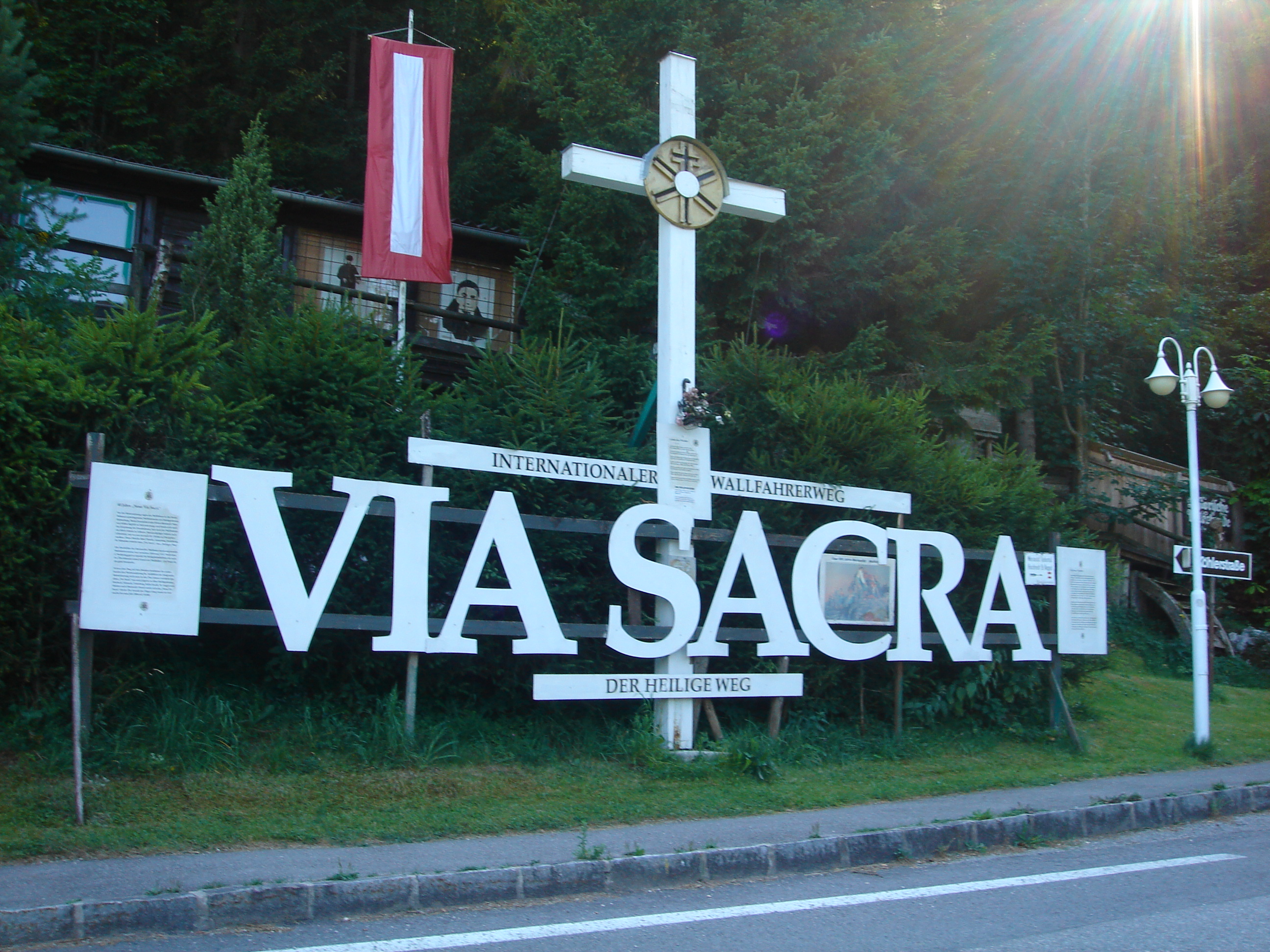
Via Sacra at Kalten Kuchl in the Wienerwald (2007)

The Via Sacra (Latin for Holy Road) is a centuries old pilgrimage trail in Lower Austria. It starts in Vienna and passes through the Wienerwald to Mariazell.

One version of the route starts in Vienna and passes by the Wildegg Castle along the way to Heiligenkreuz.

Another version of the trail starts in Brunn am Gebirge goes from Mödling through Gaaden, Heiligenkreuz, Alland, and the pilgrimage destination Hafnerberg, first into the Triestingtal, and then over the Gerichtsberg into the Gölsental and Traisental. Along it there are many remarkable shrines. The pilgrims have been an economic factor in the area since early in its history. There are many inns on the trail, which live off the pilgrims.
