= Heiligenkreuz, Lower Austria =

Heiligenkreuz Heilingkreiz
- Municipality
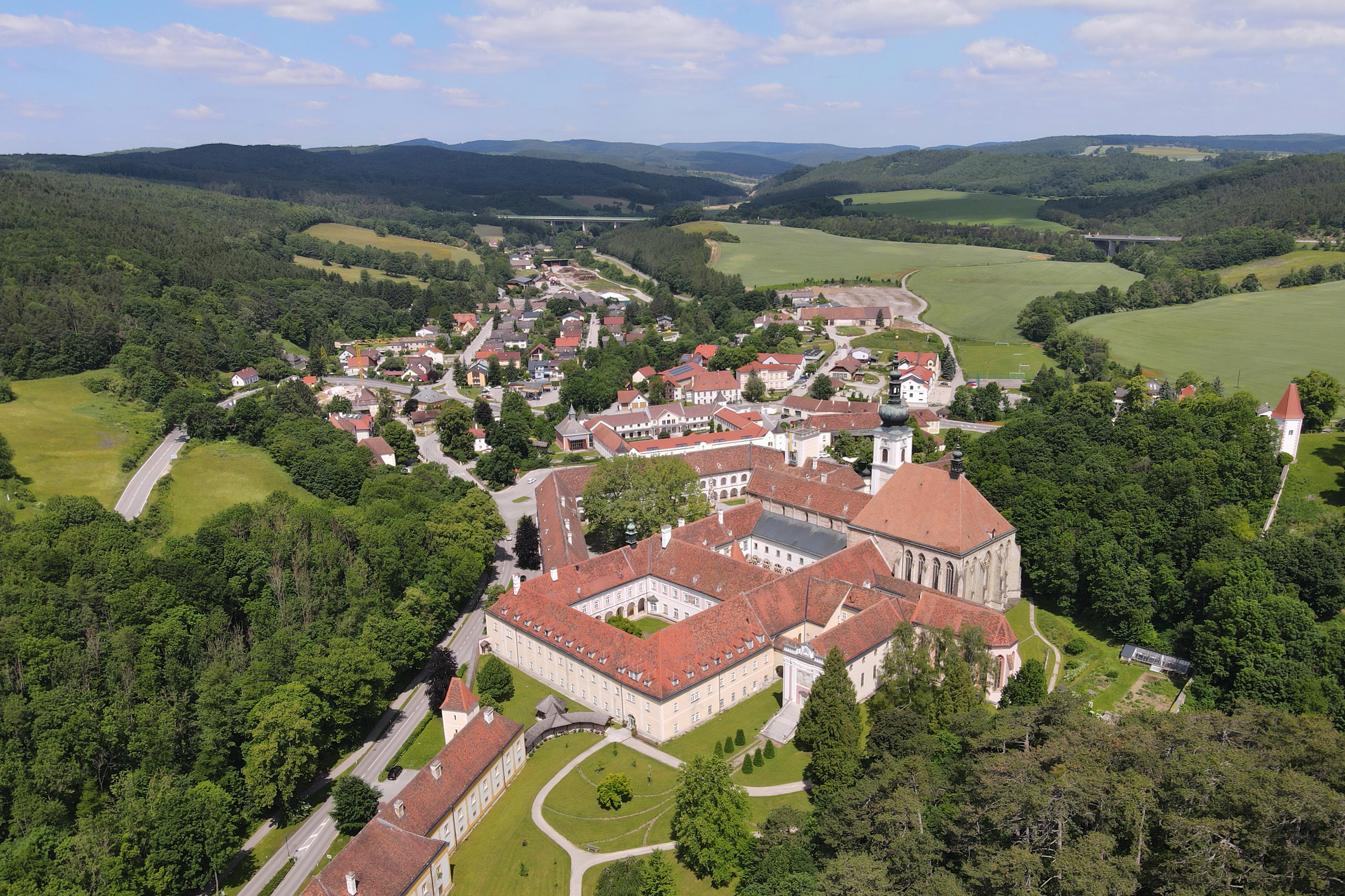
- Aerial view of Heiligenkreuz

- Coat of arms

- Location within Austria
- Coordinates: 48°03′23″N 16°07′43″E
- Country: Austria
- State: Lower Austria
- District: Baden

Government
  - Mayor: Johann Ringhofer

Area
  - Total: 29.52 km^{2} (11.40 sq mi)
- Elevation: 312 m (1,024 ft)

Population (2018-01-01)
  - Total: 1,525
  - Density: 51.66/km^{2} (133.8/sq mi)
- Time zone: UTC+1 (CET)
  - Summer (DST): UTC+2 (CEST)
- Postal code: 2532
- Area code: 02258
- Website: www.heiligenkreuz.at

Heiligenkreuz (Central Bavarian: Heilingkreiz) is a municipality in the district of Baden, in the Austrian state of Lower Austria. It is known for the Cistercian monastery of Heiligenkreuz Abbey, the associated papal college Benedict XVI, commonly known as Hochschule Heiligenkreuz, and the Catholic Leopoldinum seminary.

== Geography ==
The municipality is located within the Vienna Woods (Wienerwald) mountain range in the southwest of the Austrian capital Vienna. It is part of the Lower Austrian Industrieviertel region. Heiligenkreuz is a stop on the old Via Sacra from Vienna to the pilgrimage site Mariazell in Styria. The local economy largely depends on tourism and forestry.

The municipal area comprises the cadastral communities of Heiligenkreuz and Siegenfeld. In the southeast it borders on the district capital Baden.

== History ==
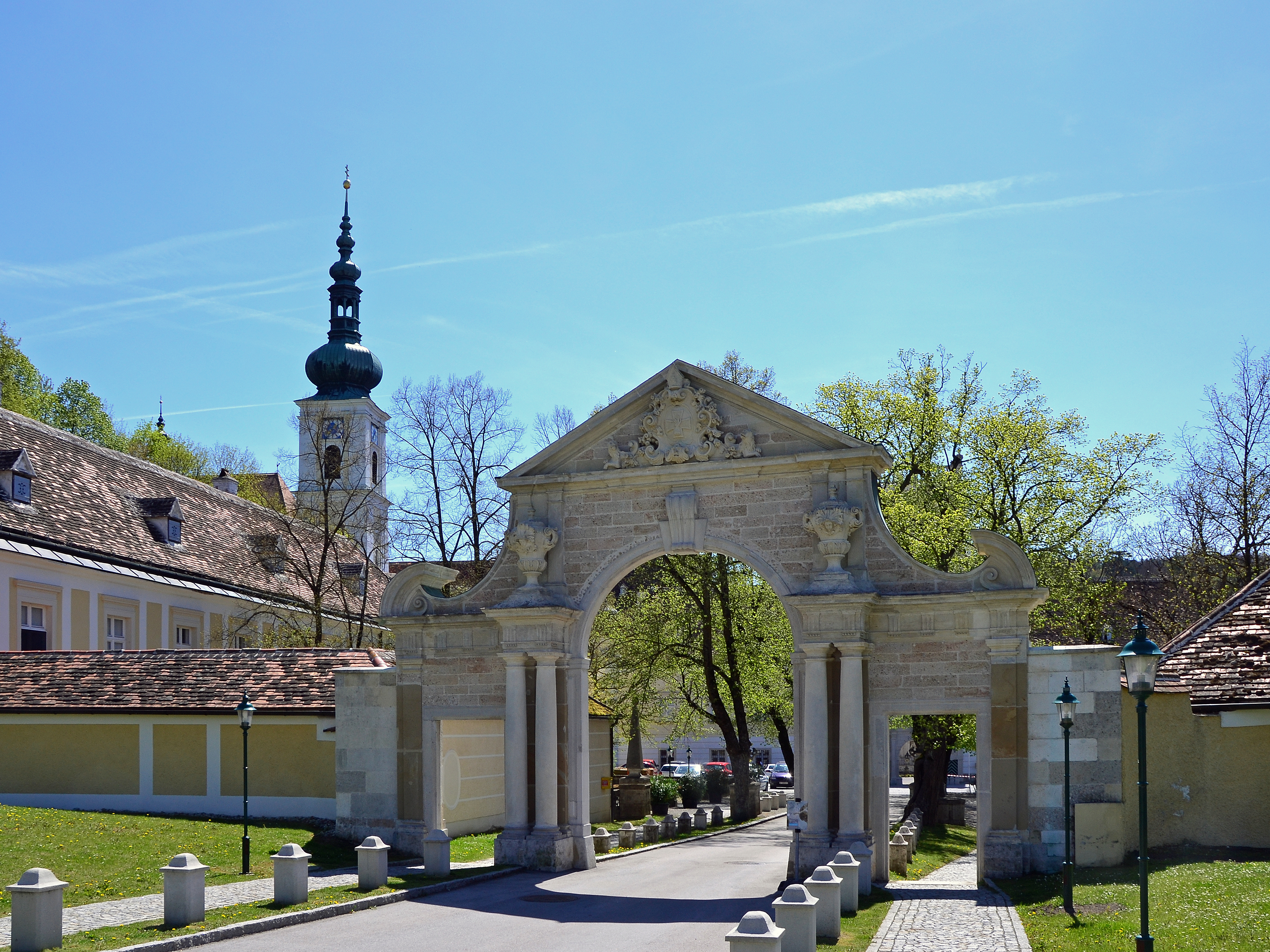
Monastery gate

The village of Siegenfeld in the March of Austria possibly arose around 1040. In 1133 the Babenberg margrave Leopold III established the Heiligenkreuz monastery in the sparsely settled area. Another nearby village, mentioned as Muchersdorf in an 1136 deed, later became abandoned.

Over the centuries, a small settlement grew outside the monastery walls, which was incorporated as the present-day municipality in 1849.

== Name ==
The name Heiligenkreuz means Holy Cross. The largest relic of the Holy Cross north of the Alps is located in the town at the monastery. The relic was given to Abbot Marquand (Abbot, 1186–1203) in 1188 by Duke Leopold V, who was given the relic in Jerusalem in 1182 by King Baldwin IV. The relic is displayed behind the altar in the Kreuzkirche (Church of the Cross) at the monastery.

== Population ==
Historical population
Year	Pop.	±%
1939	987	—
1951	1,083	+9.7%
1961	946	−12.7%
1971	1,056	+11.6%
1981	1,105	+4.6%
1991	1,324	+19.8%
2001	1,331	+0.5%
2011	1,520	+14.2%

== Politics ==
Seats in the municipal assembly (Gemeinderat) as of 2010 local elections:

- Austrian People's Party (ÖVP): 15
- Social Democratic Party of Austria (SPÖ): 3
- The Greens – The Green Alternative: 1
