= Dialogue of the Carmelites =

- Directed by: Raymond Léopold Bruckberger (as R.L. Bruckberger); Philippe Agostini
- Written by: Raymond Léopold Bruckberger (R.L. Bruckberger) (adaptation); Philippe Agostini (adaptation)
- Screenplay by: Raymond Léopold Bruckberger (R.L. Bruckberger); Philippe Agostini
- Based on: Gertrud von Le Fort (novella); Georges Bernanos (play)
- Starring: Jeanne Moreau; Alida Valli; Madeleine Renaud; Pascale Audret; Pierre Brasseur; Jean-Louis Barrault
- Cinematography: André Bac
- Edited by: Gilbert Natot
- Music by: Jean Françaix
- Color process: Black and white
- Production company: Champs-Élysées Productions
- Distributed by: Lux Compagnie Cinématographique de France
- Release date: 10 June 1960
- Running time: 113 minutes
- Countries: France; Italy
- Language: French

Dialogue with the Carmelites (French: Le dialogue des Carmélites, Italian: I dialoghi delle Carmelitane, also known as The Carmelites) is a 1960 French-Italian historical drama film written and directed by Raymond Léopold Bruckberger and Philippe Agostini and starring Jeanne Moreau, Alida Valli, Madeleine Renaud, Pascale Audret, Pierre Brasseur and Jean-Louis Barrault. It is based upon the play by Georges Bernanos, which in turn was adapted from the novella The Song at the Scaffold by Gertrud von Le Fort. It's the story of the Martyrs of Compiègne, Carmelite nuns who were guillotined in Paris in 1794 in the waning days of the Reign of Terror during the French Revolution, after refusing to renounce their vocation.

== Plot ==
During the difficult years of the French Revolution, the young noblewoman Bianca, on the advice of her father, the Marquis de la Force, has entered the cloistered convent of the Carmelites of Compiègne. Her need to find a safe refuge is accompanied by a certain religious vocation, but, despite this, she is afraid of facing sacrifices and suffering and of not being up to her choice.

Soon the revolutionary authorities and the people begin to harass the nuns, accusing them of being reactionary enemies of the homeland, who grab riches and give hospitality to fugitives. Forced to leave the convent, the nuns vow to be willing to sacrifice their lives so that the Catholic religion can survive in France.

Dispersed in small groups, almost all of them are arrested, found guilty and sentenced to death. The procession that accompanies them to the Place du Trône-Renversé (now the Place de la Nation), where the execution is to take place, crosses the streets of Paris between prayers, blessings and religious songs. Bianca de la Force, with courage, climbs the gallows in place of Mother Mary of the Incarnation, who is the only one to be saved and who alone will continue to practice the teaching of Carmel.

== Cast ==
- Jeanne Moreau as Mère Marie de l'Incarnation
- Alida Valli as Mère Thérèse de Saint-Augustin
- Madeleine Renaud as La première prieure
- Pascale Audret as Soeur Blanche de l'Agonie du Christ (Blanche de la Force)
- Pierre Brasseur as Le commissaire de la République
- Jean-Louis Barrault as Le Mime
- Anne Doat as Soeur Constance de Saint-Denis (Marie-Geneviève Meunier)
- Georges Wilson as L'aumǒnier du Carmel
- Pierre Bertin as Le marquis de la Force
- Claude Laydu as Le Chevalier de la Force
- Judith Magre as Rose Ducor
- Simone Angèle as Soeur Agnès (as Simone Angele)
- Pascale de Boysson as Soeur Cécile
- Jacqueline Dane as Soeur Gabrielle
- Paula Dehelly as Soeur Catherine
- Hélène Dieudonné as Soeur Jeanne de la Divine Enfance (as Helene Dieudonne)
- Yvette Etiévant as Soeur Lucie, la tourière (as Yvette Etievant)
- Anouk Ferjac as Soeur Gabrielle
- Sophie Grimaldi as Soeur Anne de Jésus
- Lydia Lester as Soeur Gertrude
- Margo Lion as Soeur Saint-Louis
- Nicole Polack as Soeur Charlotte
- Hélène Vallier as Soeur Agathe
- Lucien Arnaud as Le cocher
- Camille Guérini as Docteur Javeline, le médecin du Carmel (as Camille Guerini)
- Renaud Mary as Fouquier-Tinville
- Lucien Raimbourg as Le commissaire -adjoint
- Albert Rémy as un sans-culotte (as Albert Remy)
- Daniel Ceccaldi as L'Officier
