= Charlotte of the Resurrection =

French saint

Saint Charlotte de la Résurrection
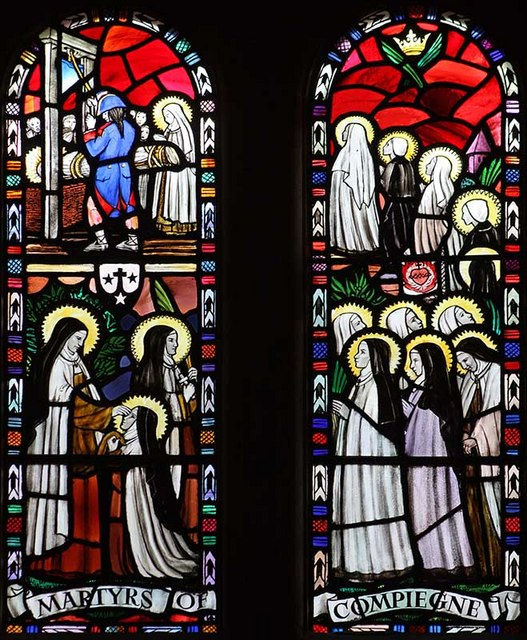
- Born: Anne-Marie-Madeleine-Françoise Thouret; 16 September 1715; Mouy, Kingdom of France
- Died: 17 July 1794 (aged 78); Paris, France
- Venerated in: Catholic Church, Carmelites
- Beatified: 27 May 1906 by Pope Pius X
- Canonized: 18 December 2024, Apostolic Palace, Vatican City by Pope Francis
- Feast: 17 July

Anne-Marie-Madeleine-Françoise Thouret, known as Charlotte of the Resurrection, is the oldest of the martyrs of Compiègne, who were executed by guillotine in Paris during the reign of terror.

She was beatified on 27 May 1906, by Pope Pius X, and canonized on 18 December 2024 by Pope Francis and her feast day is celebrated on 17 July.

== Biography ==
=== Childhood and entry into the Carmelite Order ===
Anne-Marie-Madeleine Thouret was born on the 16 September 1715 in Mouy, in the diocese of Beauvais. Her father died when she was a child and her mother remarried. Her relationship with both her mother and step-father was strained.

As a youth, she developed a love of dancing, and took every opportunity to escape from her family and go dancing. She was highly sought after for her cheerful personality, which allowed her to develop connections who were able to help her hide her disobedience. At some point, a "tragic event", according to her, occurred during a ball, and she swore that she would never set foot in a ballroom again.

She joined Carmel de Compiègne at the age of 21 in 1736, and professed her final vows 5 years later. At this point, she took on the name Sister Charlotte of the Resurrection.

She first served as a nurse in the convent's infirmary, and then as a painter. It was reported that she was so dedicated to her duties that her health suffered.

=== French Revolution ===
When the French Revolution broke out in 1789, Charlotte, age 74, was the prioress of Carmel de Compiègne, presiding over 21 nuns, and needed a crutch to walk.

As a result of 13 February 1790 decree suppressing French religious orders, to which Charlotte had a strong negative reaction, all of the sisters were invited to declare whether their intention was to leave the nunnery. All of them affirmed a wish to "live and die in this holy house". They were expelled two years later.

=== Vision and Consecration ===
A century before the revolution, one of the Carmelite sisters named Élisabeth-Baptiste, had a vision of all of the nuns of the convent in the glory of the heavens, dressed in white robes and holding hands. As a result, the possibility of the martyrdom of all the occupants of the convent had been anticipated for a century, until the arrival of the Revolution and the violence that accompanied it.

In September 1792, the mother superior felt a growing desire for martyrdom among the nuns, so she proposed to the nuns that they consecrate themselves as a sacrifice to appease the wrath of God, so that "the divine peace which his beloved Son brought to the world would be rendered to the Church and the State."

All of the nuns enthusiastically accepted the proposal except for two of the older sisters, who expressed hesitations. They were not concerned about the act of sacrifice itself so much as the method of its accomplishment—the guillotine. However, some hours later, they changed their mind, and weeping, joined their sisters in taking the vow. The community renewed this intention every day.

On 14 September 1792, the law on religious orders was implemented and the Carmelites were expelled from the convent. Some families in the town of Compiègne gave them lodging, and they lived in small groups in four different houses, closely surveilled by the local police. They continued to discreetly live according to the rules of Saint Teresa of Avila and secretly attended Mass.

=== Martyrdom ===
Laws passed in Prairial in the second year of the revolutionary calendar intensified anti-religious policies, and the nuns were arrested on 23 June 1794, and imprisoned in the convent building, which had been converted to a prison. They were sent to Paris on 12 July 1794 for judgment.

They arrived in the court of the Conciergerie after a difficult journey. The nuns had their hands tied behind their backs and struggled as they were ordered to descend from the carriage. Charlotte was unable to get up without her crutch, and was thus unable to descend from the carriage. One of the executioners threw her out of the carriage with such violence that bystanders thought she had died from the fall. This harsh treatment of an old woman drew an outcry from those present in spite of their general lack of sympathy toward the nuns.

Charlotte and the other nuns were summarily tried, convicted, and executed at the Place de la Nation on 17 July 1794. Her body, along with those of the other nuns, were buried in a mass grave at the neighboring Picpus cemetery.

== Beatification ==
Charlotte was beatified along with the other Carmelite nuns of Compiègne on 27 May 1906, by Pope Pius X. She was commemorated along with the 16 other Carmelites with a feast on 17 July.

== Canonization ==
Charlotte was canonized along with the other Carmelite nuns of Compiègne on 18 December 2024, by Pope Francis.
