= Martyrs of Compiègne =

16 Carmelites executed in France in 1794

Saints Martyrs of Compiègne
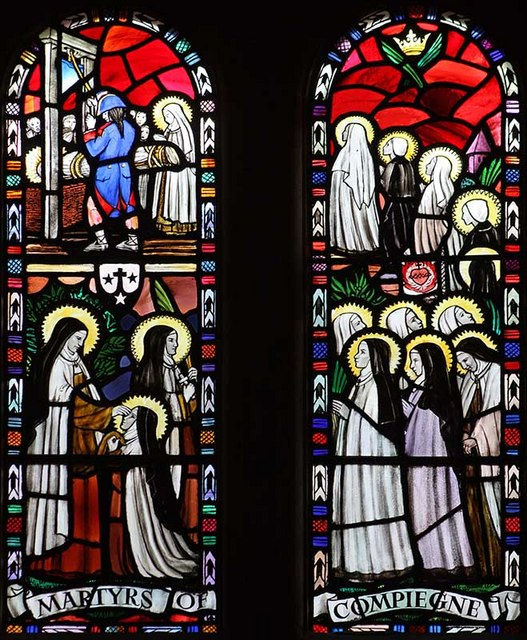
- Stained glass window in the Church of Our Lady of Mount Carmel, Quidenham, England

Virgin martyrs
- Born: c. 1715–1765; Various
- Died: 17 July 1794; Place du Trône Renversé (modern day Place de la Nation), Paris, France
- Cause of death: Decapitation by order of the Committee of Public Safety of the National Convention of Revolutionary France
- Venerated in: Catholic Church
- Beatified: 27 May 1906, Saint Peter's Basilica, Kingdom of Italy by Pope Pius X
- Canonized: 18 December 2024, Apostolic Palace, Vatican City by Pope Francis
- Feast: 17 July
- Attributes: Crown of martyrdom, Carmelite habit, Martyr's palm, Rosary, crucifix
- Patronage: Discalced Carmelites; Persecuted Christians

The Martyrs of Compiègne were the 16 members of the Carmel of Compiègne, France: 11 Discalced Carmelite nuns, three lay sisters, and two externs (or tertiaries). They were executed by the guillotine towards the end of the Reign of Terror, at what is now the Place de la Nation in Paris on 17 July 1794, and are venerated as saints in the Catholic Church. Ten days after their execution, Maximilien Robespierre himself was executed, ending the Reign of Terror. The story of the Carmelite martyrs has inspired a novella, a motion picture, a television movie, and an opera, Dialogues of the Carmelites, written by French composer Francis Poulenc.

== History ==
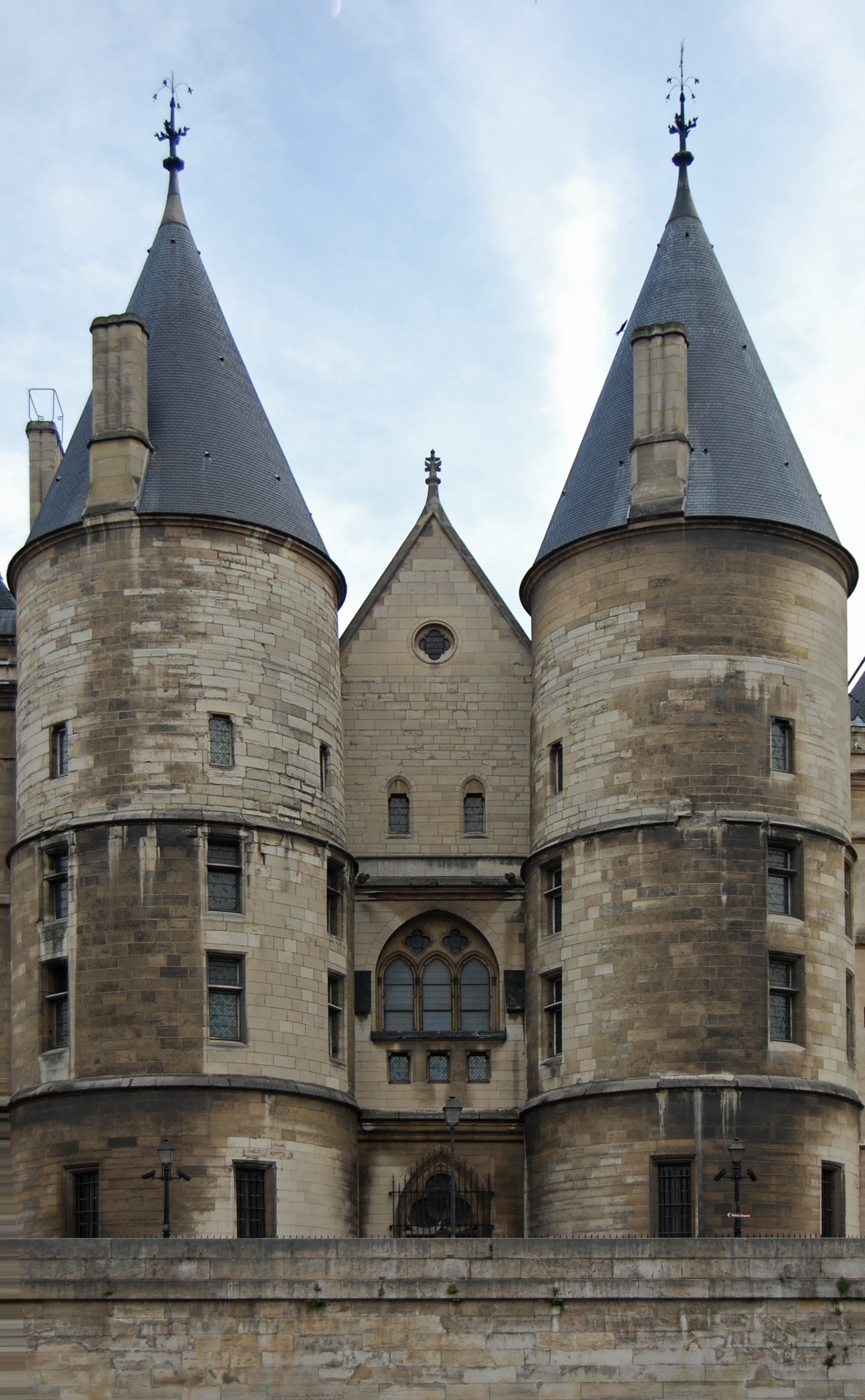
The Conciergerie, the prison the sisters were held while awaiting trial

The number of Christian martyrs increased greatly in the early years of the French Revolution. Thousands of Christians died by the guillotine or as the result of forced exile, drownings, imprisonment, shootings, mob violence, and "sheer butchery". In 1790, the French Revolutionary government passed the Civil Constitution of the Clergy, which outlawed religious life.

The community of Carmelite sisters at Compiègne, a commune 72 km north of Paris, was founded in 1641, a daughter house of the monastery in Amiens. The community grew rapidly and "was renowned for its fervor and fidelity". It was supported by the French court. Shortly after Bastille Day, on 4 August 1790, government officials, with armed guards, interviewed each sister at their convent in Compiègne and forced them to choose between breaking their vows or risking further punishment. They all refused to abandon their lives of obedience, chastity, and poverty. They were allowed to remain at the convent and were deemed wards of the state, which entitled them to receive government pensions. The revolutionary government, at the end of 1791, required all clergy to swear a civic oath supporting the Civil Constitution or risk losing their pensions. At Easter 1792, the government plundered churches and interrupted services. Mother Teresa of St. Augustine, the convent's prioress, suggested to the community that they commit themselves to execution and offer themselves as a sacrifice for France and for the French Church.

In August 1792, the government ordered all women's monasteries closed; the seizure and removal of the Compiègne convent's furnishings occurred on 12 September, and the sisters were forced to leave the convent and re-enter the world on 14 September, the end of their cloistered community. Mother Teresa made arrangements for the 20 sisters living in the convent at the time to hide in the city in four separate apartments and find civilian clothes for them to wear, since the wearing of habits and religious apparel had been outlawed. They were dependent on the charity of friends, and "courageously continued to practice community prayer", despite the government's orders.

In 1794, after the Terror began, the government searched the sisters' apartments for two days; they found letters revealing their "crimes" against the Revolution, which included hostility to the Revolution, strong sympathies to the monarchy, and evidence that they continued to live as a community of consecrated Christian women. They also found two letters written by "the unfortunate" Mulot de la Ménardière to his cousin, Sister Euphrasia of the Immaculate Conception, containing unfavorable criticisms of the Revolution. Mulot was accused of helping them and of being a non-juring priest, even though he was married, and was arrested and imprisoned with the sisters. On 22 June, the sisters and Mulot were arrested and locked up in the former convent of the Visitation, an improvised jail for political prisoners in Compiègne. On 10 July 1794, they were transferred to the Conciergerie Prison in Paris to await trial. The sisters recanted their civic oath while in prison.

During their trial on 17 July 1794, in which they received no legal counsel, Sister Mary-Henrietta tried to force the prosecutor to define the word "fanatic", one of the charges against them. She pretended she did not know what the word meant, thus getting him to admit their fanaticism was due to their religion, which made them "criminals and annihilators of public freedom". Mother Teresa claimed full responsibility for the charges of being counter-revolutionaries and religious fanatics, and defended and insisted on the others' innocence. All 16 sisters, along with Mulot, were sentenced to death. At one point, while waiting for the transportation from the Conciergerie to the site of their executions, one of the nuns, Sister St. Louis, after consulting with Mother Teresa, bartered a fur wrap she owned for a cup of chocolate for the sisters to drink from to give them strength after not being able to eat anything all day. There were 26 nights between their arrest and execution.

== Execution ==
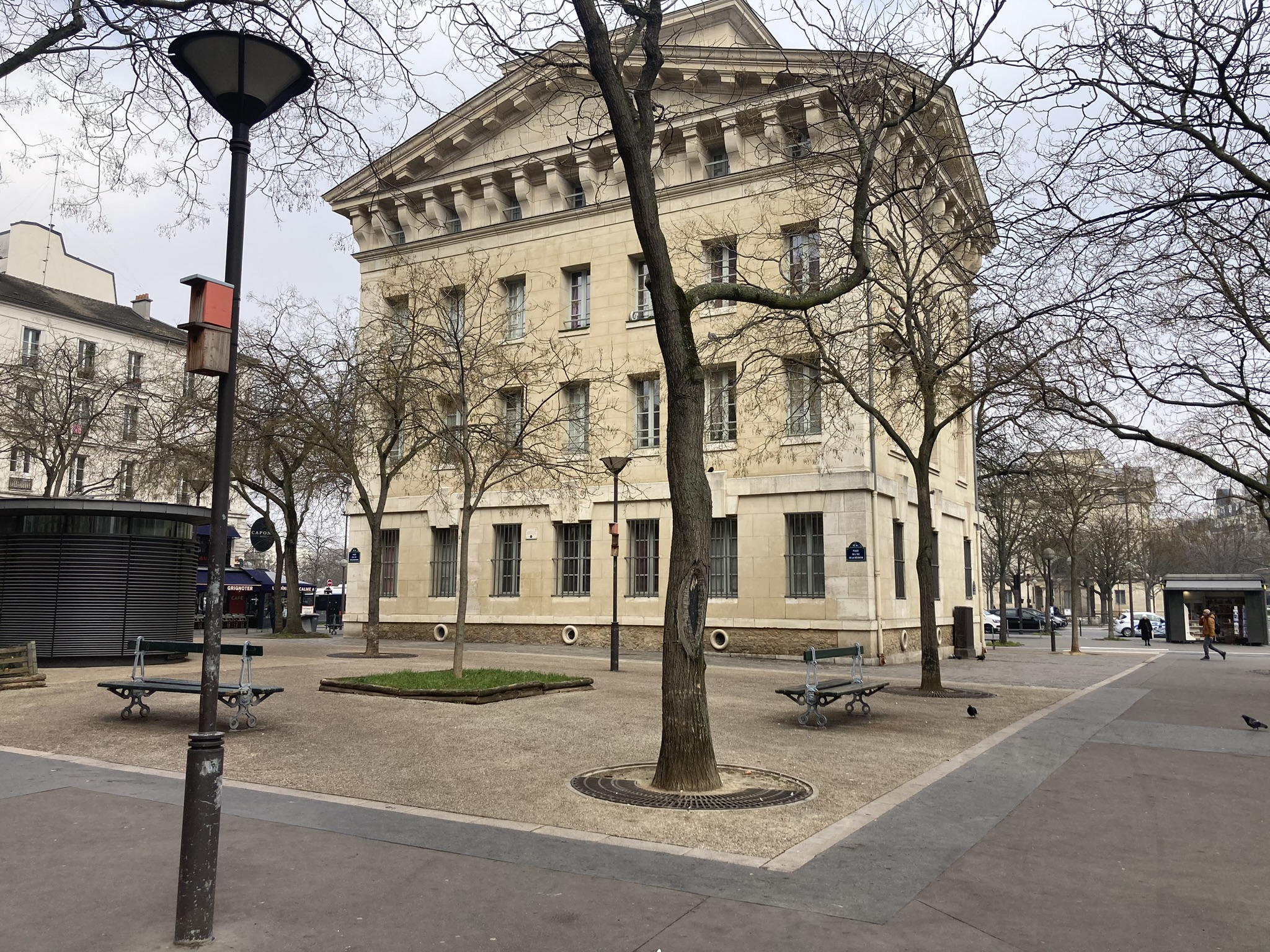
The place de l’Île de la Réunion abuts what is now the place de la Nation in the 12th arrondissement. This discreet square is the exact location where the guillotine that killed the sisters was set up.

On the night of 17 July 1794, the sisters were transported through the streets of Paris in an open cart, a journey that took two hours. During that time, they sang "hymns of praise," including the Miserere, the Salve Regina, the evening vespers, and the Compline. Other sources state that they sang a combination of the Office of the Dead, the vespers, the Compline, and other shorter texts. Onlookers berated them, yelling insults and throwing things at them. While waiting to be executed, a sympathetic woman from the crowd offered the sisters water, but Sister Mary-Henrietta stopped one sister from accepting, insisting that it would break their unity and promising that they would drink when they were in heaven. A crowd gathered, as usual, at the Place du Trône Renversé (now called Place de la Nation), the site of the executions, to watch, but the sisters showed no fear and forgave their guards. The final song the sisters sang was Psalm 116, Laudate Dominum. Sister Constance, a novice, the youngest of the group, was the first to die; she "spontaneously" began the chant, but it was cut short by the guillotine blade. Each sister joined her and was silenced in the same way.

Before their execution they knelt and chanted the "Veni Creator" as a profession and then renewed their baptismal and religious vows out loud. According to scholar John Wainewright, "absolute silence prevailed the whole time that the executions were proceeding". Sister Charlotte, who at 78 years of age was the oldest sister, walked with a crutch and was unable to stand up and get out of the cart because her hands were tied and the other sisters were unable to help her. Eventually a guard gathered her up in his arms and threw her on the street; she lay face down on the pavement stones, with no signs of life as the crowd protested against the guard's treatment of her. She stirred, lifted up her blood-smeared face, and warmly thanked the guard for not killing her, "thereby depriving her of her share in her community's glorious witness for Jesus Christ". Sister Mary-Henrietta stood by her prioress until it was her turn to die, helping the 14 other sisters climb the scaffold steps before climbing them herself, and was the second-to-last to die. Mother Teresa died last.

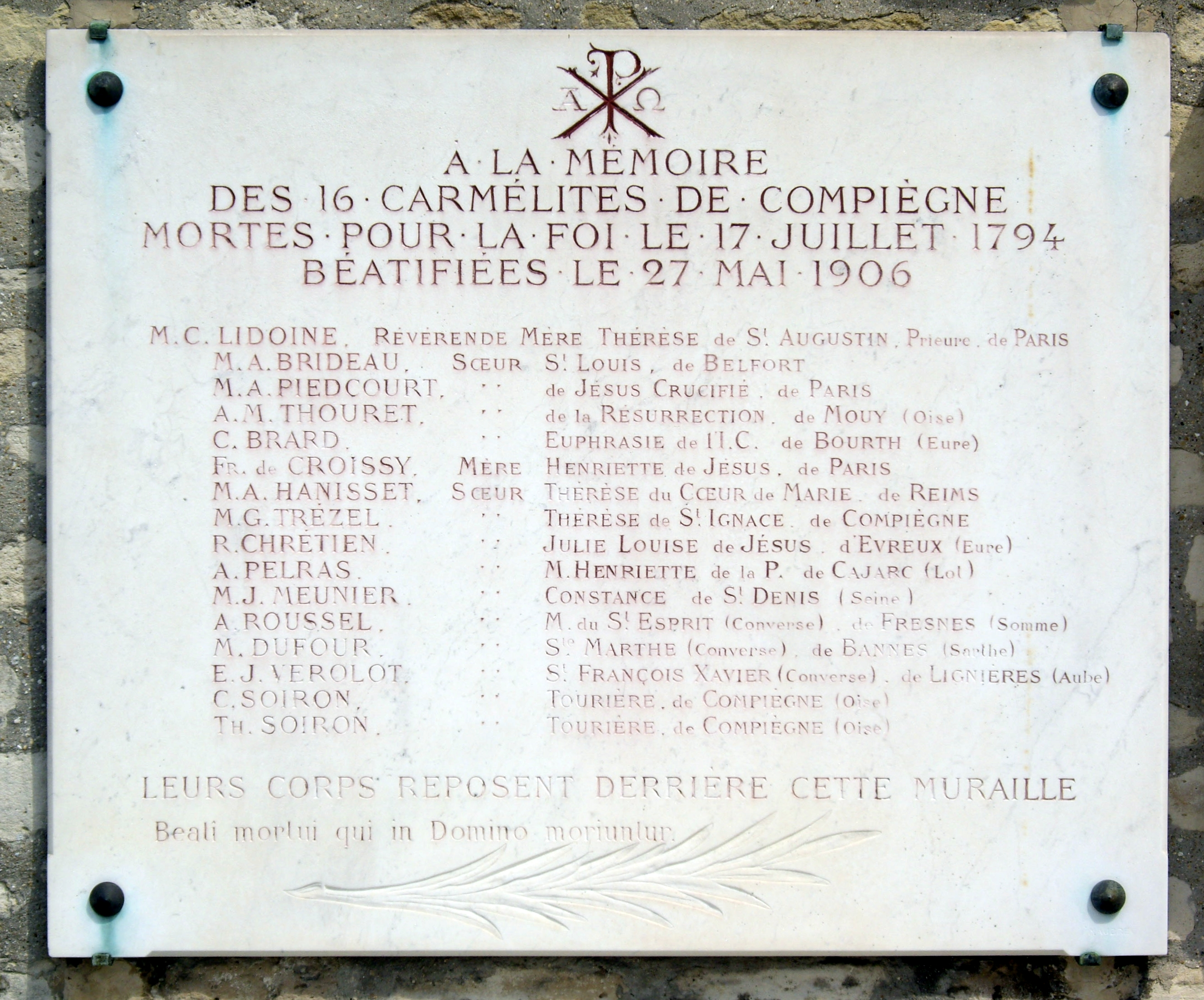
Plaque at Picpus Cemetery dedicated to the Martyrs of Compiègne

There are no surviving relics of the Martyrs of Compiègne because their heads and bodies were buried, along with 128 other victims executed that day, in a deep, 30-feet square sand-pit in the Picpus Cemetery. Five second-class relics, however, are in the possession of the Benedictines in Stanbrook Abbey in North Yorkshire. Their burial site, located in the back of the cemetery, is marked with two large, gravel-covered quadrangles. The heads and torsos of the 1,306 people who were guillotined at the Place de la Nation between 13 June and 27 July 1794 are buried there. Their names, including the 16 Martyrs of Compiègne as well as Mulot de la Ménardière, are inscribed on marble plaques covering the walls of a nearby church, where prayer is offered continuously. On the day the sisters were killed there were 24 other victims.

== Veneration ==
The Martyrs of Compiègne were beatified on 27 May 1906 by Pope Pius X. They were the first martyrs of the French Revolution to be recognized by the Holy See. Their feast day is 17 July. There were four miracles proven during the process of beatification: the cure from cancer in June 1897 of a Carmelite lay sister from New Orleans, at point of death; the cure of an abbé at the seminary in Brive, also at the point of death, in March 1897; the cure of a Carmelite lay sister in Vany, of tuberculosis and an abscess in her right leg, in December 1897; and the cure of a Franciscan sister from Montmorillon in April 1898.

On 22 February 2022, the Roman Catholic Diocese of Beauvais announced that Pope Francis had accepted the procedure of equipollent canonization for the Martyrs of Compiègne, which would allow them to be canonized as saints without having a miracle attributed to their intercession recognized.

All sixteen sisters were recognised as saints of the Church on 18 December 2024 by Pope Francis via equipollent canonization as expected.

== Legacy ==
Ten days after the sixteen were executed, Maximilien Robespierre was executed, ending the Reign of Terror. French Catholics of the time believed that the public executions of the nuns "helped bring about the end to the horrors of the revolution" and hastened the end of the Reign of Terror.

Three of the sisters were away from the community at the time of the arrests and so escaped execution. One of them, Marie de l'Incarnation (Françoise Geneviève Philippe), wrote an account of the execution, History of the Carmelite nuns of Compiègne, which was published in 1836. The story of the Martyrs of Compiègne has inspired a novella, an unproduced film, a play, and an opera. In 1931, the German writer Gertrud von Le Fort drew on the History for a novella called Die Letzte am Schafott (The Song at the Scaffold), centered on a fictional character named Blanche de la Force, notable for her timidity, who abandons herself to fear and is rewarded with the grace that allows her to emerge from the crowd of spectators to join the other sisters on the scaffold "without trembling, jubilantly". Her work appeared in an English translation as The Song of the Scaffold in 1933. Emmet Lavery used Le Fort's novella as the basis for his 1949 play, titled The Song at the Scaffold.

Raymond-Leopold Bruckberger, a French Dominican, and cinematographer Philippe Agostini developed a film project based on Le Fort's novella. Though their project never made it into production, they made an important contribution to the legacy of the Carmelites of Compiegne in 1947 when they persuaded Georges Bernanos to write its dialogue. With the film abandoned, Bernanos' dialogue became a stage drama. It premiered in 1951 in Zurich as Dialogues des carmélites and ran for 300 performances the following year. Bruckberger and Agostini eventually resurrected their film project and used Bernanos' text as the basis for the French film Le Dialogue des Carmélites, written and directed by Agostini and released in 1960. James Travers and Willems Henri wrote that "despite its starry cast and needlessly showy production values" the film has "stood the test of time and deserves to be more widely known". They also said that the film "more than does justice to Georges Bernanos' play and provides a thoughtful and emotionally involving reflection on the power and limits of faith". The cast included well-known French actors: Pierre Brasseur, Jeanne Moreau, Madeline Renaud, Alida Valli, Georges Wilson, and Jean-Louis Barrault. In 1984, another version adapted from Bernanos was directed by Pierre Cardinal for a French television. This included more of Bernanos' dialogue than the 1960 film and featured Bernanos' granddaughter Anne Caudry in the cast.

French composer Francis Poulenc was commissioned to write a ballet based on Bernanos' dialogue for La Scala and Casa Ricordi, but instead wrote an opera titled Dialogues of the Carmelites. As of 2019, the Metropolitan Opera had performed the opera 59 times, first in English, then in its original French, since 1977.

In 2024, a French documentary was made to tell the true story of the Carmelites of Compiègne by François Lespes. In 2026 "Blessed : the martyrs of Compiègne" received the award of Best Director from the Mirabile Dictu International Catholic Film Festival in Rome.

== List of the martyrs ==
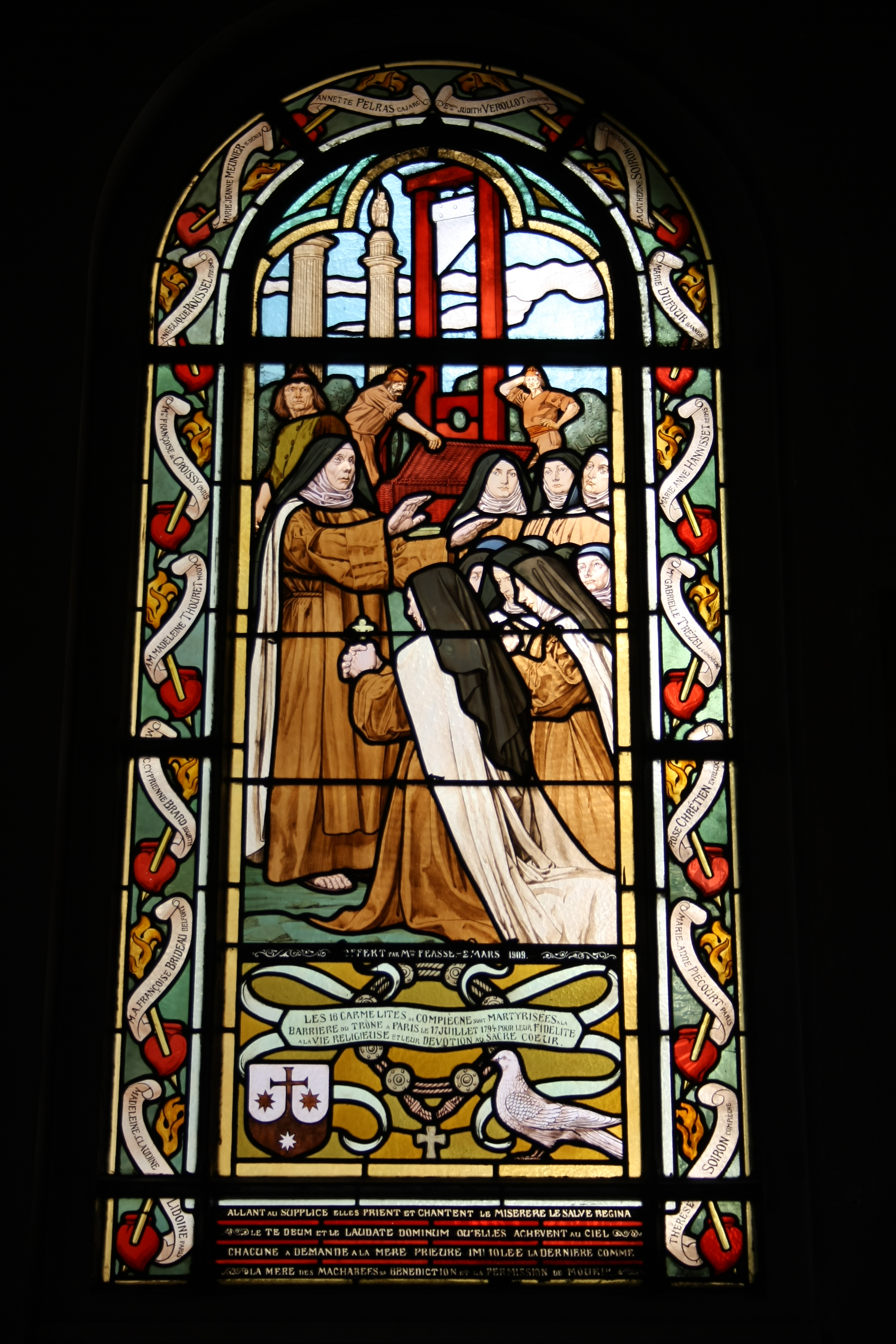
Stained glass window in the Saint-Honoré d'Eylau Church in Paris

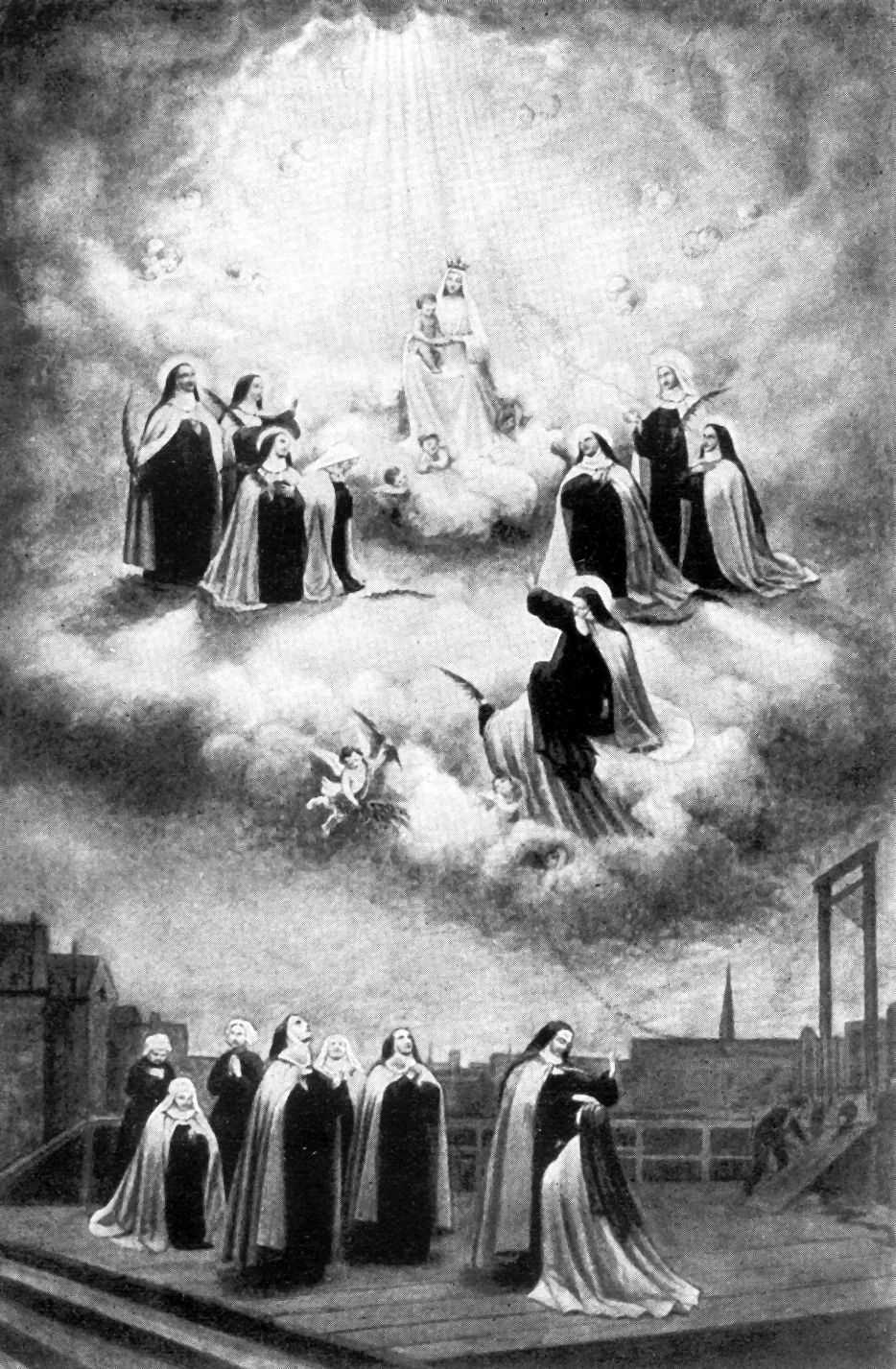
The Carmelites of Compiègne facing the guillotine. Illustration taken from Louis David, O.S.B., 1906

The Martyrs of Compiègne consisted of 11 nuns, three lay sisters, and two externs (or tertiaries).

Choir Nuns

- Mother Teresa of St. Augustine, prioress (Madeleine-Claudine Lidoine). Born in Paris, 22 September 1752. Professed May 1775. She was the only child of an employee of the Paris Observatory. According to Bush, "she received every educational advantage available to young ladies of the time". Her artistic and poetic gifts were cultivated; some of her work has been preserved at the Carmels of Compiègne and Sens. Her dowry to enter the convent was paid by Marie Antoinette. She almost escaped execution when she returned to her family's home in Paris to care for her widowed mother who was ill, but she returned to Compiègne on 13 July 1794.
- Mother St. Louis, sub-prioress (Marie-Anne, or Antoinette, Brideau). Born in Belfort, 7 December 1752. Professed Sept, 1771. Her father was a professional soldier, probably stationed at Compiègne at some point in his career.
- Mother Henriette of Jesus, ex-prioress for two terms, elected by the community in 1779 and 1782; novice mistress (Marie-Françoise Gabrielle de Croissy). Born in Paris, 18 June 1745. Professed 22 February 1764, prioress from 1779 to 1785. Mother Henriette was the great-niece of Jean-Baptiste Colbert, King Louis XIV's minister. She had already spent half her life as a Carmelite at the time of her execution, coming to Compiègne when she was 16. She was refused entrance at first by the prioress at the time because of her youth. She was sent home in Amiens for another year, and finally made her profession in 1764. According to Mother Teresa, Henriette "won all hearts by her natural gentleness and affection, as might a real mother". Like Mother Teresa, Henriette wrote verses and was a talented artist; some of her works have also been preserved at the Carmels of Compiègne and Sens.
- Sister Mary of Jesus Crucified (Marie-Anne Piedcourt). Born in Paris, 9 December 1715, professed 1737. While mounting the scaffold she said, "I forgive you as heartily as I wish God to forgive me."
- Sister Charlotte of the Resurrection, ex-sub-prioress (1764 and 1778) and sacristan (Anne-Marie-Madeleine Thouret). Born in Mouy, 16 September 1715. Professed August 1740. Twice sub-prioress in 1764 and 1778. Sister Charlotte was the oldest sister of the group of martyrs. She "possessed a very lively mind" and was "naturally inclined towards gaiety". She entered the religious life after witnessing a tragedy at one of the balls she attended as a young girl. She nursed other sickly nuns, despite the toll it took on her own body. She was miraculously healed after toxic exposure to paint lead left her seriously cognitively impaired for two years.
- Sister Euphrasia of the Immaculate Conception (Marie-Claude Cyprienne). Born in Bourth, 12 May 1736, professed in 1757; entered Compiègne in 1756, at the age of 20. She was witty, humorous, and "possessed an undeniable exterior charm". Sister Euphrasia wrote priests and others in the religious life for spiritual direction and "left a voluminous correspondence" during her 30 years in the community. Her letters reveal "a strong personality plagued by a certain restlessness, something always potentially problematic in a cloistered community".
- Sister Teresa of the Sacred Heart of Mary (Marie-Antoinette Hanisset). Born in Rheims, 18 January 1742. Professed in 1764. She was the daughter of a saddle maker. She served as the Carmel's interior turn sister, receiving goods for the community from the outside world.
- Sister Julie Louise of Jesus, widow (Rose-Chrétien de la Neuville). Born in Évreux), 30 December 1741. Probably professed in 1777. She had married a cousin despite her calling to the religious life. After her husband died prematurely, she became so depressed and disconsolate, she went into deep mourning, to the point that her family feared for her sanity. She received help from a cleric associated with her family and recovered with a new sense of her calling. She wrote five stanzas of verse for her and her sisters to recite as they prepared for their deaths.
- Sister Teresa of St. Ignatius (Marie-Gabrielle Trézel) Born in Compiègne, 4 April 1743. Professed on 12 December 1771. She was called "a mystic with a sense of the Absolute".
- Sister Mary-Henrietta of Providence (Anne Petras). Born in Cajarc, 17 June 1760. Professed in October 1786. Sister Mary-Henrietta, before joining the Carmelite order, was a member of the Sisters of Charity of Nevers. She was afraid "her natural beauty might prove a danger in a congregation where she was constantly exposed to the outside world", so she sought a more cloistered life. She came from a large, pious family; five of her sisters were also nuns in the Nevers order, and two of her brothers were priests.
- Sister Constance of St. Denis, novice (Marie-Geneviève Meunier). Born in Saint-Denis, 28 May 1765 or 1766. Sister Constance was the youngest member of the community. She was barred from making her final vows as a nun due to the revolutionary laws outlawing it, so she professed them to Mother Teresa before going to her death. When it became obvious to her family that she would not be able to legally profess her vows, they sent her brother to force her to return home. She refused, so he brought in the police, but they were convinced that she was in Compiègne by her own choice and did not force her to leave with her brother.

Lay Sisters

- Sister St. Martha, lay sister (Marie Dufour). Born in Beaune, 1 October or 2, 1742. Entered the community in 1772.
- Sister Mary of the Holy Spirit, lay sister (Angélique Roussel). Born in Fresnes, 4 August 1742. Professed 14 May1769.
- Sister St. Francis Xavier (Julie or Juliette Vérolot), lay sister. Born in Lignières, 13 January 1764. Professed 12 January 1789. She was illiterate, but she "distinguished herself as much by her youthful zeal and good humor as by her terse expressions of love for Jesus Christ". In the convent, her main task was to care for the older nuns.

Externs

Tertiaries in service of the community since 1772.

- Catherine Soiron, born 2 February 1742.
- Thérèse Soiron, born on 23 February 1748.

== See also ==
- Pierre-Marie Grayo de Keravenan
