= Rose-Chrétien de la Neuville =

Saint Blessed Rose-Chrétien de la Neuville OCD
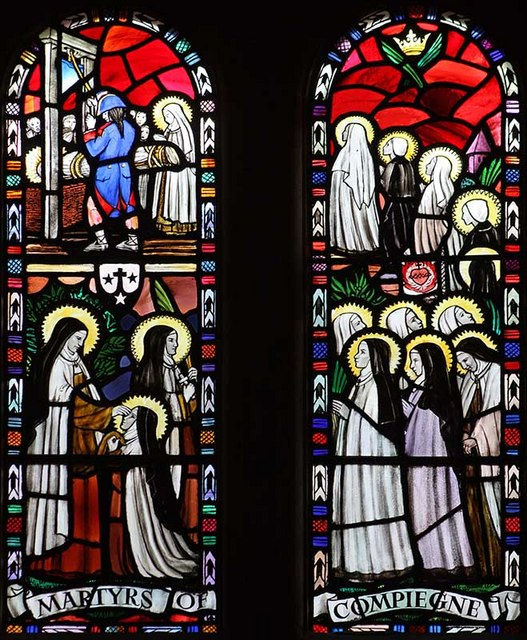

Martyr
- Born: 1741 near Évreux, Duchy of Normandy, Kingdom of France
- Died: 17 July 1794 (aged 52–53); Place du Trône Renversé (now Place de la Nation) Paris, France
- Venerated in: Roman Catholic Church
- Beatified: 27 May 1906, Saint Peter's Basilica by Pope Pius X
- Canonized: 18 December 2024, Apostolic Palace, Vatican City by Pope Francis
- Feast: 17 July

Rose-Chrétien de la Neuville, OCD (1741 - 17 July 1794) was a French Discalced Carmelite nun killed during the French Revolution. She was beatified as one of the Martyrs of Compiègne in 1906.

== Background ==
She married young but was widowed. She took vows as a choir nun in 1777, taking the religious name Julie Louise of Jesus. In 1794, de la Neuville was guillotined in Place du Trône Renversé in Paris.

On 27 May 1906, the Carmelite Martyrs of Compiègne were beatified by Pope Pius X.
