= Maison Coignard =

Building during the French Revolution

Coordinates: 48°50′39″N 2°23′49″E

The Maison Coignard was a prison hospital (French: maison de santé) opened during the French Revolution to house wealthy prisoners from the various prisons opened during the Reign of Terror then underway.

== History ==
The location was originally a community of canonesses regular founded in 1640 by King Louis XIII, named the Priory of Our Lady of Victory of Lepanto, in commemoration of the Christian victory over Ottoman forces in the Battle of Lepanto in 1571. Its site is on the corner of what is now Boulevard Diderot with Rue de Picpus.

In 1792 the building was confiscated by the French government and the canonesses were forced to disband. In late 1793 the complex was leased by Eugène Coignard and converted into a 150-bed private prison hospital for those prisoners of the Terror who were able to pay for a more comfortable confinement. The majority of the people held there escaped execution. The most notorious prisoner at the Maison Coignard was the Marquis de Sade.

The former convent gardens were seized by the city and used to bury the bodies of those executed at a guillotine set up in the nearby Place du Trône. The site was later purchased by surviving family members of the aristocracy who were buried in the common graves of the site. Today the cemetery is the Picpus Cemetery. A new community of canonesses, belonging to the Congrégation des Sacrés Coeurs de Marie et de Jésus de l'Adoration Perpétuelle, was established, and continues, in the old buildings with the intention of commemorating the dead in perpetuity.
