= Henri Admirat =

Assassin (1744–1794)

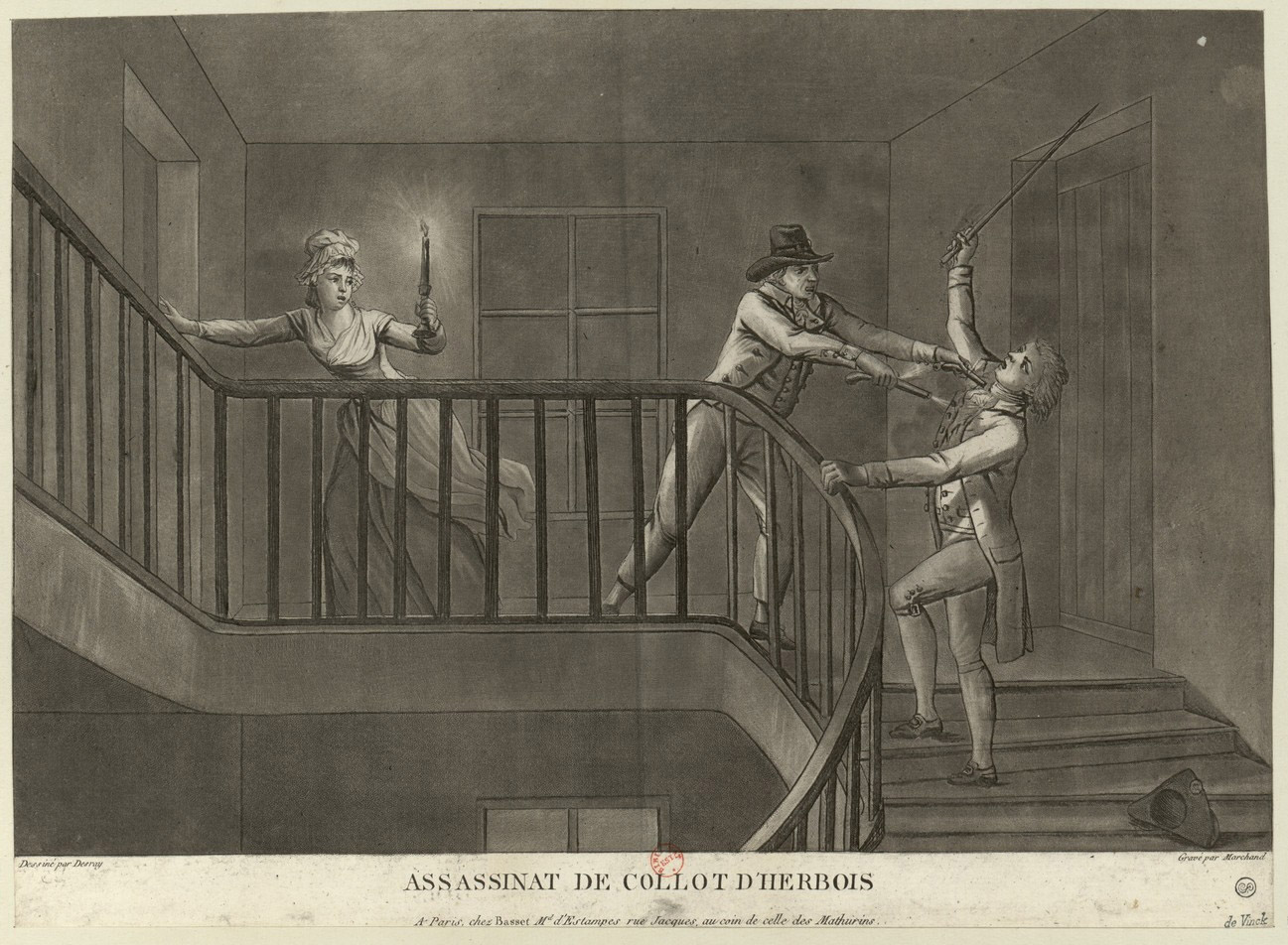
Attempt to assassinate Jean-Marie Collot d'Herbois by Henri Ladmiral (stamp).

Henri Admirat (3 September 1744 – 17 June 1794) was a notable figure in the French Revolution. He was executed on the guillotine for attempting to assassinate Jean-Marie Collot d'Herbois.

== Admirat's assassination attempt ==
Henri Admirat lived in the same building as Jean-Marie Collot d'Herbois. He bore grudges against the Revolution, not least for closing down the public lottery of which he had been an employee, and making him redundant. He decided to assassinate Collot and had lain in wait for his victim, armed with two pistols. Collot, returning from a late-night meeting of the Committee of Public Safety, was chatting with his governess on the stairway when Admirat struck. Admirat fired two shots at Collot at point-blank range, but both pistols misfired. Collot then defended himself with his sword and managed to prevent the would-be assassin from escaping from the building. Admirat barricaded himself in his flat and was later arrested by the passing National Guards patrol, but not before seriously wounding a man named Geoffroy who was helping the National Guards to gain entry into the flat.

== Trial and execution ==
Admirat was brought into the Revolutionary Tribunal and subjected to a trial that lasted only two minutes in which he could only answer. Admirat's sentence of death was a foregone conclusion. He never provided an explanation of the assassination attempt in public and his testimony, written in the secret Committee of General Security, an oppressive police body in the Revolutionary Government, is used by historians with extreme caution. On 17 June 1794, Admirat was guillotined at the Place de la Nation. His body is buried with fifty-three others in Picpus Cemetery.
