= The Song at the Scaffold =

1931 novella by Gertrud von Le Fort

- Title page for The Song at the Scaffold (1933 edition)
- Author: Gertrud von Le Fort
- Original title: Die Letzte am Schafott
- Translator: Olga Marx
- Language: German
- Publisher: Kösel & Pustet
- Publication date: 1931
- Publication place: Germany
- English publication date: 1933
- Pages: 136

The Song at the Scaffold (German: Die Letzte am Schafott) is a 1931 novella by the German writer Gertrud von Le Fort.

== Description ==
It is set during the French Revolution and is written as a letter from an exiled French nobleman who recounts what he has seen in France. The story focuses on a fictional noblewoman, Blanche de la Force, who was a postulant at the convent of the Discalced Carmelites in Compiègne. During the time of the revolution, this convent begot the martyrs of Compiègne, a group of nuns brought to the scaffold by the revolutionaries.

The Song at the Scaffold is a Catholic novella that portrays the loss of Christian ideals as the reason for a society's turn to madness. It became particularly popular among Christian existentialists due to its subject of fear. The Encyclopedia of Catholic Literature associates its themes with an appeal to call on God in times of fear, the prayer during Catholic mass for Jesus to protect the faithful from anxiety, divine grace as a mystery during adversity, and Psalm 4, verse 1: "thou hast enlarged me when I was in distress".

The novella was the basis for the 1949 play The Song at the Scaffold by Emmet Lavery and for The Carmelites by Georges Bernanos, originally written as a film screenplay in 1948 but performed as a play. Bernanos' version was adapted into the 1956 opera Dialogues of the Carmelites by Francis Poulenc and the 1960 film Dialogue of the Carmelites directed by Raymond Léopold Bruckberger and Philippe Agostini.
