= Charles E. Stanton =

American U.S. Army officer

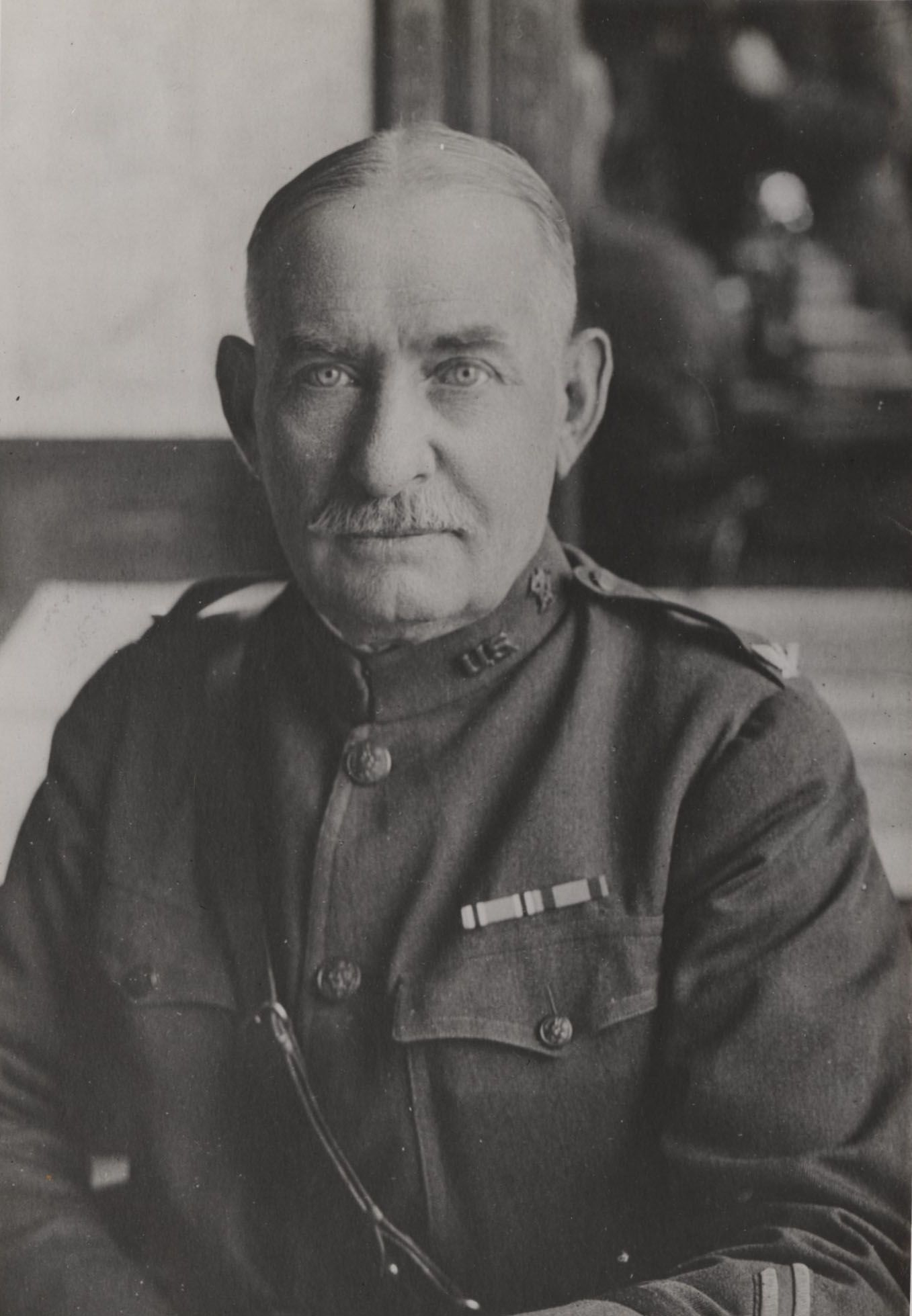
- Stanton as a colonel, circa 1918
- Born: November 22, 1858; Monticello, Illinois
- Died: May 8, 1933 (aged 74); San Francisco, California
- Military career
- Allegiance: United States of America
- Branch: United States Army
- Service years: 1898–1921
- Rank: Colonel
- Unit: American Expeditionary Forces
- Conflicts: Spanish–American War; World War I
- Awards: Army Distinguished Service Medal; Legion of Honor (France)
- Other work: Commissioner, San Francisco Board of Public Works

Charles Egbert Stanton (November 22, 1858 – May 8, 1933) was an officer in the United States Army, and attained the rank of colonel. A veteran of the Spanish–American War, he served as chief disbursing officer and aide to General John J. Pershing during World War I. He is best known for having included the memorable expression "Lafayette, we are here!" in a speech he gave in Paris during the First World War.

== Early life ==
Charles E. Stanton was born in Monticello, Illinois on November 22, 1858, a son of Egbert Stanton and Adeline (Morgan) Stanton. As a boy he was raised in part along the roadbed of the Union Pacific Railroad during its construction as part of the First transcontinental railroad; his father ran businesses that catered to the construction crews, and was operating the railroad hotel at Promontory, Utah when the railroad was completed in 1869. At the ceremony on Promontory Summit where engines of the Union Pacific and the Central Pacific Railroad touched cowcatchers to symbolize the opening of the transcontinental route, Stanton rode in the UP's engine and rang the engine's bell.

Stanton was educated in San Francisco, and then attended Santa Clara University and Yale University. He worked at silver mines in Nevada, farmed in Minnesota, sold mineral water for a company in Idaho, and sold fire extinguishers in San Francisco. He served as Chief Clerk of the Utah Territorial Assembly, and Salt Lake County Clerk. He was a delegate to the Utah constitutional convention which resulted in statehood in 1895.

== Army career ==
In 1898 Stanton was appointed a paymaster of volunteers in the United States Army with the rank of major. He served in the Philippines during the Spanish–American War, and after his 1901 discharge accepted a regular Army commission as a captain in the paymaster corps. He continued to serve in the army, and at the start of World War I he was a lieutenant colonel on the staff of John J. Pershing. He served as chief disbursing officer for the American Expeditionary Forces, and received the Distinguished Service Medal and the French Legion of Honor. Stanton retired as a colonel on December 1, 1920.

=== Army Distinguished Service Medal citation ===
The citation for Stanton's Army Distinguished Service Medal read:

The President of the United States of America, authorized by Act of Congress, July 9, 1918, takes pleasure in presenting the Army Distinguished Service Medal to Colonel (Quartermaster Corps) Charles E. Stanton, United States Army, for exceptionally meritorious and distinguished services to the Government of the United States, in a duty of great responsibility during World War I. As Chief Disbursing Officer in the Office of the Finance Division, Quartermaster Corps, at Paris, Colonel Stanton performed his duties with unremitting zeal, displayed marked administrative ability and accurate judgment in solving problems of extraordinary difficulty, rendering services of marked worth.
Service: Army Rank: Colonel Division: Quartermaster Corps General Orders: War Department, General Orders No. 70 (1919)

== Later career ==
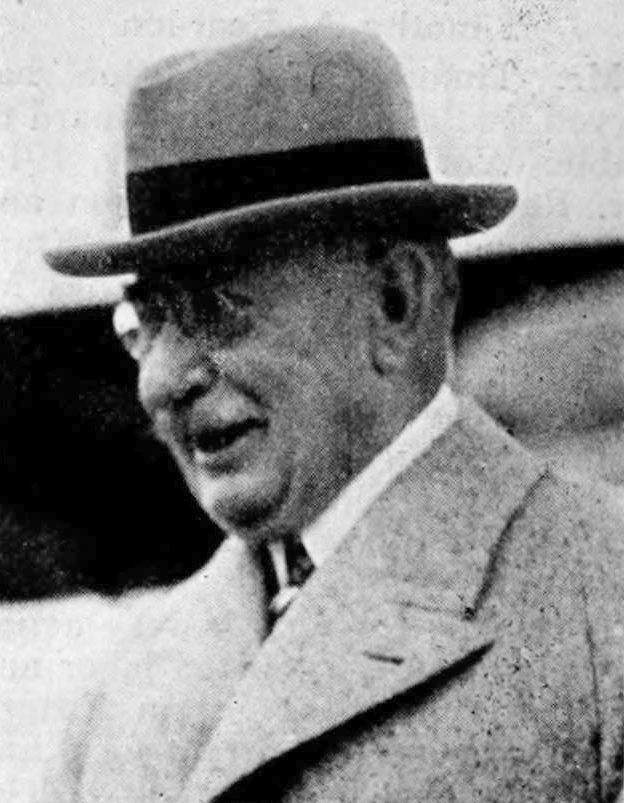
Stanton as a commissioner of the San Francisco Board of Public Works in 1929

After retiring from the army, Stanton served as a member of San Francisco's Board of Public Works. In 1931 he was enrolled in the American Legion as its one millionth member.

Stanton died in San Francisco on May 8, 1933. He was cremated at Cypress Lawn Memorial Park in Colma, California.

== Lafayette quote ==
On July 4, 1917, Stanton visited the tomb of French Revolution and American Revolution hero Marquis de Lafayette in Picpus Cemetery of Paris and (according to Pershing) said, "Lafayette, we are here!" to honor the nobleman's assistance during the Revolutionary War and assure the French people that the people of the United States would aid them in World War I. The famous quote is often misattributed to Pershing, but Pershing himself attributed it to Stanton.

In context, Stanton said:

America has joined forces with the Allied Powers, and what we have of blood and treasure are yours. Therefore it is that with loving pride we drape the colors in tribute of respect to this citizen of your great republic. And here and now, in the presence of the illustrious dead, we pledge our hearts and our honor in carrying this war to a successful issue. Lafayette, we are here!

== Sources ==
- McHenry, Robert and Charles Van Doren (1971). Webster's Guide to American History. New York: Merriam.
- (1917). "Record Crowd in Paris." The New York Times. July 6.
- Unger, Harlow Giles (2002). Lafayette. New York: Wiley.
