= Josse-François-Joseph Benaut =

Josse-François-Joseph Benaut (c. 1743 in Gullegem – 13 July 1794, Paris) was a Flemish composer, organist, harpsichordist, music educator and priest who had a career in France.

== Life ==
His father Charles Benaut was an organist in Wulveringen in Flanders. Josse-François-Joseph Benaut set himself up in Paris as a harpsichord tutor and in 1771 married the daughter of a Flemish merchant.

He was guillotined during the French Revolution on what is now Place de la Nation, Paris as he was suspected of being in contact with the rebels of the Vendée.
