= Gudrun Trausmuth =

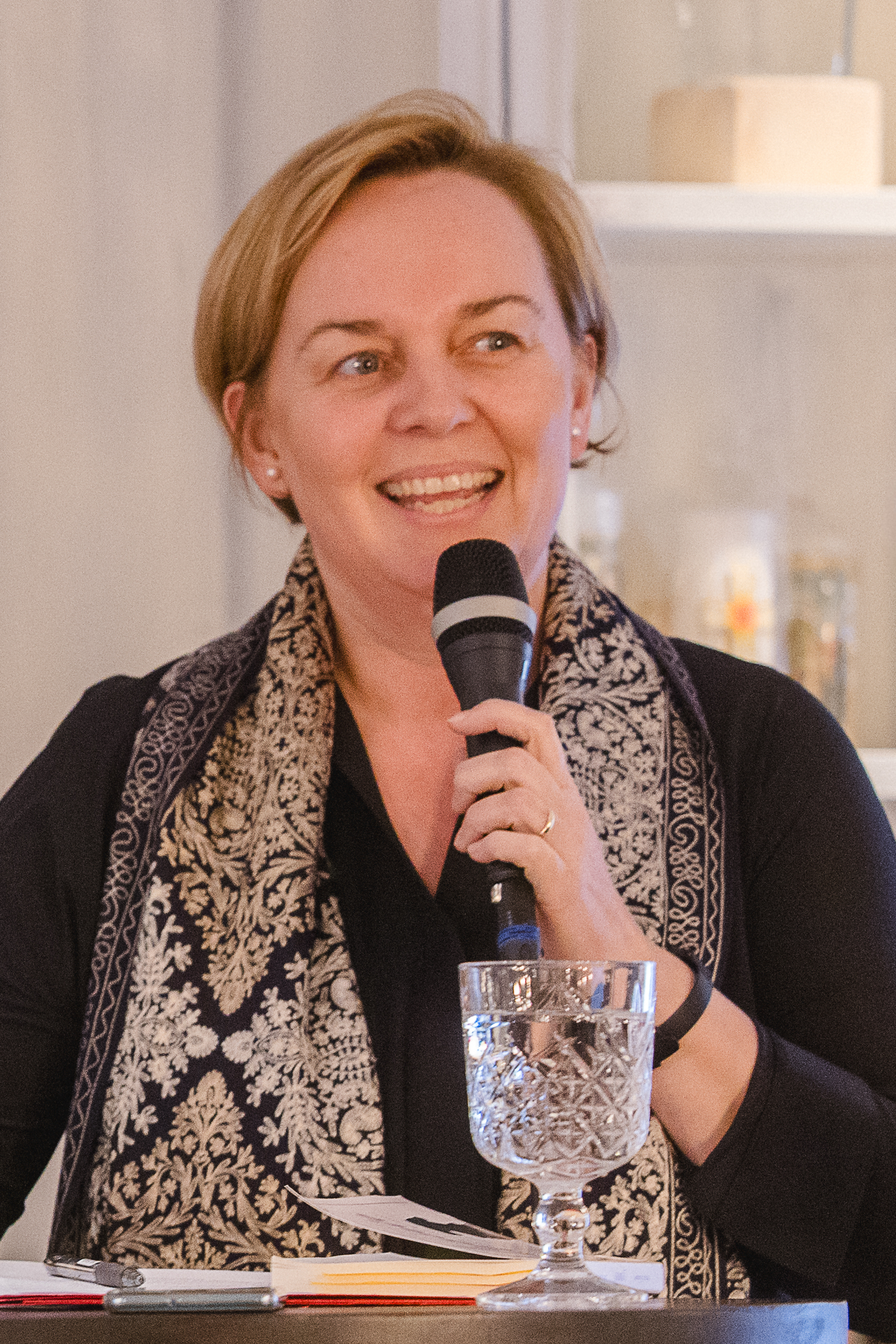
Trausmuth in 2023

Gudrun Trausmuth (née Födermayr; born 10 October 1969) is an Austrian literary scholar and Catholic journalist.

== Biography ==
Trausmuth grew up in the Austrian-Bavarian border region. After graduating from high school in Untergriesbach, Bavaria, she studied German philology and Romance languages at the University of Vienna, with study visits to Angers and Paris. She completed her doctorate ander Werner Welzig at the University of Vienna on sermons portrayed in 19th and 20th century narrative literature. She worked as a translator and from 1998 to 2004 as an educational consultant at the University of Vienna's Catholic Community.

She has been working in radio and print journalism since 2013. Gudrun Trausmuth is an editorial staff member at Radio Maria Austria. Since 2013, she has been publishing in the German weekly newspaper Die Tagespost. From 2016 to 2020, she published the column “BeneDicta” on cultural and socio-political topics on the news portal Kath.net. Since 2020, Trausmuth has been teaching Philosophy of Religion at the European Institute for Religion and Philosophy at the Benedict XVI Philosophical-Theological University in Heiligenkreuz. In 2021, she launched Vatican Magazine's literature column devoted to “Great Texts of the West.”

In collaboration with philosopher Hanna-Barbara Gerl-Falkovitz, Trausmuth publishes the Kleine Bibliothek des Abendlandes (Small Library of the Occident). Trausmuth has been president of the Gertrud von le Fort Society for the Promotion of Christian Literature, based in Würzburg, since June 2021. Trausmuth has been an author at www.corrigenda.online since 2023. Trausmuth is part of the editorial team of the online weekly magazine Libratus. She gives lectures on topics related to literary studies, reading education, and cultural philosophy.

Trausmuth is married and has two sons.

== As editor ==
- Don Camillo and Peppone: Ausgewählte Geschichten. Ed. Hanna-Barbara Gerl-Falkovitz and Gudrun Trausmuth. Leselicht: Karl Wallner. Kleine Bibliothek des Abendlandes. Vol. 10. Heiligenkreuz: Be&Be 2025. ISBN 978-3-903518-26-1
- Neue Schau: Große christliche Erzählungen im 20. Jahrhundert. Ed. Hanna-Barbara Gerl-Falkovitz and Gudrun Trausmuth. Leselichter: Hanna-Barbara Gerl-Falkovitz, Gudrun Trausmuth, Alkuin Schachenmayr, Kosmas Thielmann, Uwe Wolff, Jennifer Bryson. Kleine Bibliothek des Abendlandes. Vol. 9. Heiligenkreuz: Be&Be 2023. ISBN 978-3-903602-74-8
- Bernhard von Clairvaux: Honig aus dem Felsen. Ed. Hanna-Barbara Gerl-Falkovitz and Gudrun Trausmuth. Leselicht: Alkuin Volker Schachenmayr. Kleine Bibliothek des Abendlandes. Vol. 8. Heiligenkreuz: Be&Be 2021 ISBN 978-3-903602-15-1
- Werner Bergengruen: Am Himmel wie auf Erden. Ed. Hanna-Barbara Gerl-Falkovitz and Gudrun Trausmuth. Leselicht: Nicolaus Buhlmann. Kleine Bibliothek des Abendlandes. Vol. 7. Heiligenkreuz: Be&Be 2020. ISBN 978-3-903118-92-8
- John Henry Newman: Betrachtungen and Gebete. Ed. Hanna-Barbara Gerl-Falkovitz and Gudrun Trausmuth. Leselicht: Paul Bernhard Wodrazka. Kleine Bibliothek des Abendlandes, Vol. 6. Heiligenkreuz: Be&Be 2018. ISBN 978-3-903118-74-4
- Ruth Schaumann: Die Geheimnisse um Vater Titus. Der Jugend erzählt. Ed. Hanna-Barbara Gerl-Falkovitz and Gudrun Trausmuth. Leselicht: Hanna-Barbara Gerl-Falkovitz. Kleine Bibliothek des Abendlandes, Vol. 5. Heiligenkreuz: Be&Be 2018. ISBN 978-3-903118-64-5
- Gertrud von le Fort: Das Schweißtuch der Veronika 2. Der Kranz der Engel. Ed. Hanna-Barbara Gerl-Falkovitz and Gudrun Trausmuth. Leselicht: Hans-Rüdiger Schwab. Kleine Bibliothek des Abendlandes, Vol. 4. Heiligenkreuz: Be&Be 2018. ISBN 978-3-903118-60-7
- Gertrud von le Fort: Das Schweißtuch der Veronika 1. Der römische Brunnen. Ed. Hanna-Barbara Gerl-Falkovitz and Gudrun Trausmuth. Leselicht: Gudrun Trausmuth. Kleine Bibliothek des Abendlandes, Vol. 3. Heiligenkreuz: Be&Be 2018. ISBN 978-3-903118-59-1
- Paul Claudel: Kreuzweg. Mariä Verkündigung. Leselicht: Gundula Harand, Veit Neumann. Kleine Bibliothek des Abendlandes, Vol. 2. Ed. Hanna-Barbara Gerl-Falkovitz and Gudrun Trausmuth. Heiligenkreuz: Be&Be 2017. ISBN 978-3-903118-54-6
- James Stephens: Fionn der Held. Irische Sagen and Märchen, übersetzt and eingeleitet von Ida Friederike Görres and Hanna-Barbara Gerl-Falkovitz. Kleine Bibliothek des Abendlandes, Vol. 1. Ed. Hanna-Barbara Gerl-Falkovitz and Gudrun Trausmuth. Heiligenkreuz: Be&Be 2017. ISBN 978-3-903118-29-4
- Gertrud von le Fort. Lesebuch. Mit Einleitung and Kommentar. Ed. Gundula Harand and Gudrun Trausmuth. Echter Verlag: Würzburg 2012. 3. Aufl. 2017. ISBN 978-3-429-03498-6
- Humanismus and Christentum. Ed. Veit Neumann, Gudrun Trausmuth and Julia Wächter. Regensburger philosophisch-theologische Schriften, Vol. 14. Regensburg: Pustet 2020. ISBN 978-3-7917-3201-5

== Publications (selection since 2015) ==
- Das Sprechen mit Vollmacht. Predigt im Roman. In: Die Tagespost. 26. Mai 2015.
- Dichterin der Barmherzigkeit. Misericordia bei Gertrud von le Fort. In: Die Tagespost. 28. Oktober 2016.
- Paul Claudel zum 150. Geburtstag. Wechselhafte Landschaft: Religion als Reibefläche. in: Academia. Zeitschrift des Cartellverbandes der kath. dt. Studentenverbindungen, 111.2 (2018).
- Gertrud von le Fort. Sinn and Ziel, in: Leben and Werk inspirierender Schriftsteller, S. 109–147. Ed. Stefan Meetschen and Alexander Pschera. Kißlegg: Fe-medienverlag 2016. ISBN 978-3-86357-152-8
- Werner Bergengruen. Ein Erzähler in gefährlicher Zeit. In: Poeten, Priester and Propheten. Leben and Werk inspirierender Schriftsteller, S. 177–185. Ed. Stefan Meetschen and Alexander Pschera. Kißlegg: Fe-medienverlag 2016. ISBN 978-3-86357-152-8
- C.S. Lewis: Christlicher Blick auf das Universum, in Poeten, Priester and Propheten. Leben and Werk inspirierender Schriftsteller, S. 217–225. Ed. Stefan Meetschen and Alexander Pschera. Kißlegg: Fe-medienverlag 2016. ISBN 978-3-86357-152-8
- P. Theophil Heimb O.Cist: Heiligenpredigten in Einzeldrucken (1747-1767), in: Die Lebenswelt der Zisterzienser. Neue Studien zur Geschichte eines europäischen Ordens, S. 447–479. Festschrift für P. Alkuin Schachenmayr O.Cist. Ed. Joachim Werz. Heiligenkreuz, Regensburg: Be&Be, Schnell&Steiner 2020. ISBN 978-3-903118-88-1 u. ISBN 978-3-7954-3471-7

She has made other contributions in Die Presse, Der Standard, Vatican Magazine, Analecta Cisterciensia, Lepanto Almanach, and online for the Gertrud von le Fort Society, and she is an occasional co-editor of the journal Ambo.
