= Gertrud von Le Fort =

German writer (1876–1971)

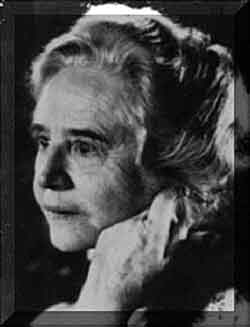
- Le Fort, c. 1935
- Born: Gertrud Auguste Lina Elsbeth Mathilde Petrea Freiin von Le Fort; 11 October 1876 Minden, Germany
- Died: 1 November 1971 (aged 95)
- Notable awards: Gottfried-Keller Prize

Baroness Gertrud von Le Fort (born Gertrud Auguste Lina Elsbeth Mathilde Petrea Freiin von Le Fort; 11 October 1876 – 1 November 1971) was a German writer.

== Life ==
Le Fort was born in Minden, in the former Province of Westphalia, then the Kingdom of Prussia within the German Empire. She was the daughter of a colonel in the Prussian Army, who was of Swiss Huguenot descent. She was educated as a young girl in Hildesheim, and went on to study at universities at Heidelberg, Marburg and Berlin. She made her home in Bavaria in 1918, living in Baierbrunn until 1939.

Despite publishing some minor works previously, Le Fort's writing career really began with the publication in 1925 of the posthumous work Glaubenslehre by her mentor, Ernst Troeltsch, a major scholar in the field of the philosophy of religion, which she had edited. She converted to Roman Catholicism the following year. Most of her writings came after this conversion, and they were marked by the issue of the struggle between faith and conscience.

In 1931, Le Fort published the novella, The Song at the Scaffold (German: Die Letzte am Schafott), based on the 1794 execution of the Carmelite Martyrs of Compiègne. An English translation appeared in 1933. In 1947, Georges Bernanos wrote film dialogue to a proposed cinema scenario by Philippe Agostini based on Le Fort's novella, but the screenplay was not filmed at the time. Following Bernanos' death, after discussion with Bernanos' literary executor, Albert Béguin, Le Fort granted permission for publication of Bernanos' work in January 1949, and gifted her portion of the royalties due to her, as creator of the original story, over to Bernanos' widow and children. Le Fort requested that Bernanos' work be titled differently from her own novella, and Beguin chose the new title Dialogues des Carmélites. This formed the basic for the opera by Francis Poulenc from 1956.

Le Fort went on to publish over 20 books, comprising poems, novels and short stories. Her work gained her the accolade of being "the greatest contemporary transcendent poet". Her works are appreciated for their depth and beauty of their ideas, and for her sophisticated refinement of style. She was nominated by Hermann Hesse for the Nobel Prize in Literature, and was granted an honorary Doctorate of Theology for her contributions to the issue of faith in her works.

In 1952, Le Fort won the Gottfried-Keller Prize.

Among her many other works, Le Fort also published a book titled Die ewige Frau (The Eternal Woman) in 1934, which appeared in paperback in English in 2010. In this work, she countered the modernist analysis on the feminine, not with polemical argument, but with a meditation on womanhood.

In 1939, Le Fort had made her home in the town of Oberstdorf in the Bavarian Alps, and it was there that she died on 1 November 1971, aged 95.

== Gertrud von le Fort Society ==
The Gertrud von le Fort Society for the Promotion of Christian Literature was founded in Würzburg in 1982. Its founding members included Gertrud von le Fort's last secretary, Eleonore von La Chevallerie, theologian Eugen Biser, and French Germanist and lecturer Joël Pottier. The first president of the society was Lothar Bossle, a professor at the University of Würzburg. Gudrun Trausmuth has served as president since 2021, with Hanna-Barbara Gerl-Falkovitz as vice president. The Society has about 110 members.

== Selected works ==
- Hymnen an die Kirche. Poetry; first published in Munich by Theatiner Verlag (1924).
- Das Schweißtuch der Veronika, I. Band: Der römische Brunnen. A novel; Munich, Kösel & Pustet, now known as Kösel-Verlag (1928).
- Der Papst aus dem Ghetto. Novel; Berlin, Transmare Verlag (1930).
- Die Letzte am Schafott. Novella; Munich, Kösel & Pustet (1931). Translated as The Song at the Scaffold by Ignatius Press (2011).
- Die ewige Frau. Essay; Munich, Kösel & Pustet (1934). Expanded publication in 1960 with the same publisher. Expanded version translated as The Eternal Woman: The Timeless Meaning of the Feminine by Ignatius (2010).
- Die Madgeburgische Hochzeit. Novel; Leipzig, Insel Verlag (1938). An English translation was published by Ignatius Press in 2024, ISBN 978-1904350361.
- Die Opferflamme. Short story; Leipzig, Insel (1938).
- Das Gericht des Meeres. Short story; Leipzig, Insel (1943).
- Das Schweißtuch der Veronika, II. Band: Der Kranz der Engel. Novel; Munich, Beckstein (1946)
- Die Consolata. Short story; Wiesbaden, Insel (1947).
- Die Tochter Farinatas. Collection of four short stories: Die Tochter Farinatas, Plus Ultra, Das Gericht des Meeres, and Die Consolata; Wiesbaden, Insel (1950). Plus Ultra translated under the same title in The Wife of Pilate and Other Stories by Ignatius (2015).
- Gelöschte Kerzen. Collection of two short stories: Die Verfemte and Die Unschuldigen; Munich, Ehrenwirth (1953). Translated respectively as The Ostracized Woman and The Innocents in The Innocents and Other Stories by Ignatius (2019).
- Am Tor des Himmels. Novella; Wiesbaden, Insel (1954). Translated as At the Gate of Heaven in The Wife of Pilate and Other Stories by Ignatius (2015).
- Die Frau des Pilatus. Novella; Wiesbaden, Insel (1955). Translated as The Wife of Pilate in The Wife of Pilate and Other Stories by Ignatius (2015).
- Der Turm der Beständigkeit. Novella; Wiesbaden, Insel (1957). Translated as The Tower of Constance in The Innocents and Other Stories by Ignatius (2019).
- Die letzte Begegnung. Novella; Wiesbaden, Insel (1959). Translated as The Last Meeting in The Innocents and Other Stories by Ignatius (2019).
- Die Hälfte des Lebens. Autobiography; Munich, Ehrenwirth (1965).
- Der Dom. Short story; Munich, Ehrenwirth (1968).

== Literature ==
- Helena M. Tomko, Sacramental Realism: Gertrud von le Fort and German Catholic Literature in the Weimar Republic and Third Reich (1924–46). London: Routledge, 2007, ISBN 978-1904350361.
