= Picpus Cemetery =

Cemetery in Paris, France

Cimetière de Picpus
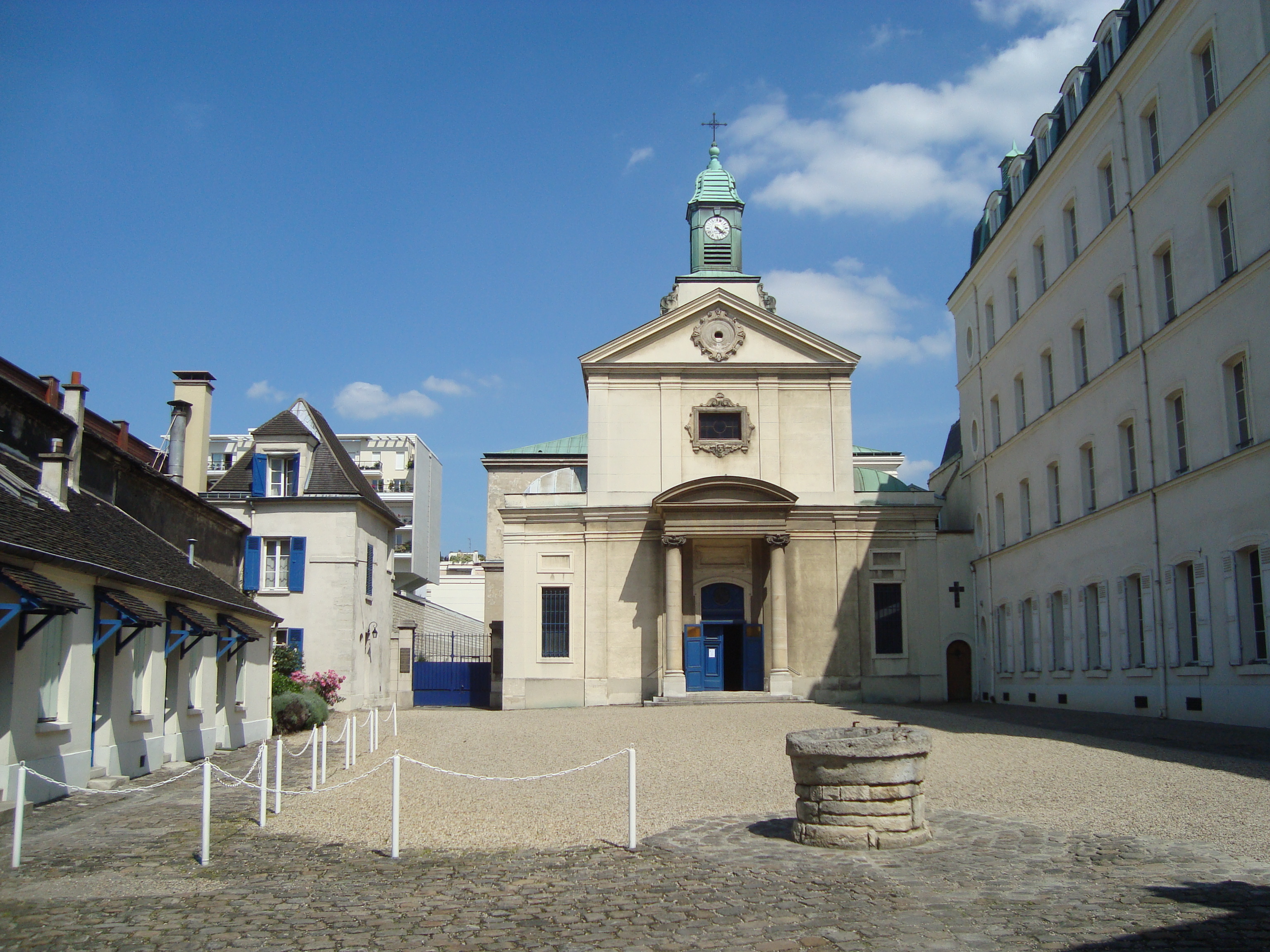
- Cemetery entrance next to chapel Notre-Dame-de-la-Paix
- Interactive map of Cimetière de Picpus

Details
- Established: 13 June 1794
- Location: 35 rue de Picpus, Paris
- Country: France
- Coordinates: 48.8440°N 2.4001°E
- Type: Private
- Size: 2.1 hectares (5.2 acres)
- No. of graves: unknown
- No. of interments: 1,306 (two mass graves)
- Find a Grave: Cimetière de Picpus

Picpus Cemetery (French: Cimetière de Picpus, [pik.pys]) is the largest private cemetery in Paris, France, and is located in the 12th arrondissement. It was created from land seized from the convent of the Chanoinesses de St-Augustin, during the French Revolution. Just minutes away from where the most active guillotine in Paris was set up, it contains 1,306 victims executed between 14 June and 27 July 1794, during the height and final phase of the Reign of Terror.

Picpus Cemetery is one of only two private cemeteries in Paris. Today, only descendants of the 1,306 victims are eligible to be buried at Picpus Cemetery.

The cemetery is of particular interest to American visitors as it also holds the tomb of the Marquis de Lafayette (1757–1834), over which an American flag always flies.

== Origins ==
The place name, Picpus, is thought to derive from French pique-puce, "flea-bite", because the local monks used to cure skin diseases that caused wounds that resembled fleabites.

During the pre-Revolutionary period, the premises upon which the cemetery is located was a walled garden and a convent. The convent was occupied by the Canonesses of Saint Augustine, but their property was confiscated during the Revolution and they were forced to leave by the Revolutionary government in 1792.

The property was then sold to a commoner, Coignard, who turned it into a maison de santé — a kind of convalescent home that also served as a prison for those fortunate enough to be able to pay the rent. Several aristocrats rented rooms from him during the Terror. The novelist Choderos de Laclos, the Marquis de Sade and the philosopher Comte de Volney all spent part of the Terror on the premises.

The cemetery is situated next to a small chapel, Notre-Dame-de-la-Paix ("Our Lady of Peace"). It is part of the cemetery complex and holds a small 15th-century sculpture of the Vierge de la Paix, reputed to have cured King Louis XIV of a serious illness on 16 August 1658.

== Reign of Terror ==
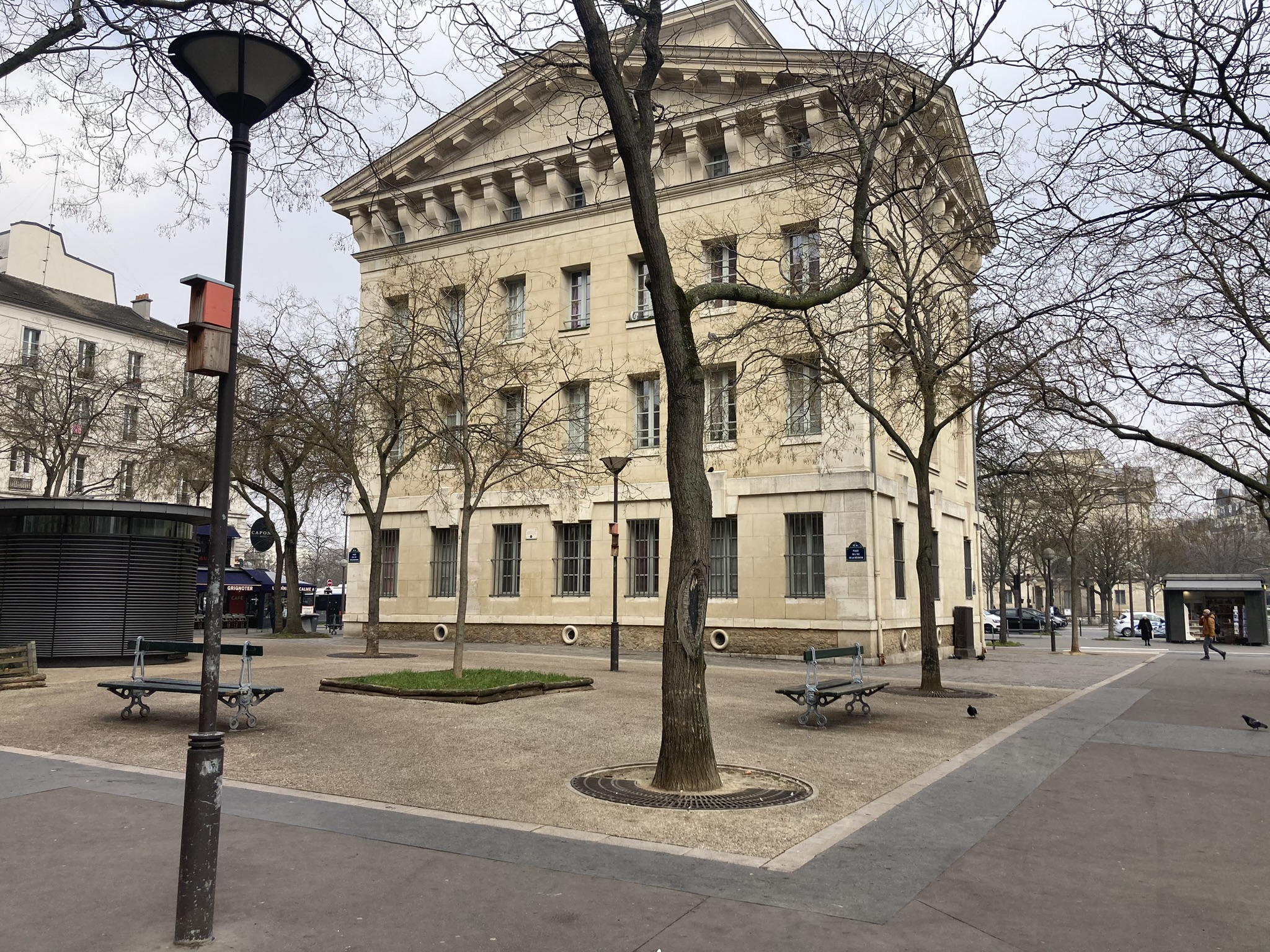
The place de l'Île de la Réunion abuts what is now the place de la Nation in the 12th arrondissement. This discreet square behind the barrière du Trône is the location where the guillotine was set up.

During the French Revolution, the guillotine was set up behind the barrière du Trône on a small square abutting the Place de la Nation, then called the Place du Trône Renversé. This guillotine operated between 13 June and 28 July 1794, during the height of, but also the final two months of the period known as the Reign of Terror.

The pace of beheading at the Trône Renversé location was rapid. As many as 55 people per day were executed. Of the 2,639 executions carried out in Paris between April 1793 and July 1794, the six weeks of operation of the Trône guillotine accounted for almost half (1306 executions).

The Revolutionary Tribunal needed a quick and relatively unobtrusive way to dispose of the bodies. It was necessary to keep a low profile for the burials because the Terror was already becoming unpopular and the local populations resented having so many dead bodies buried in their neighborhood.

The Picpus garden was only a short walk from the spot where the guillotine was set up next to what is now Place de la Nation. In June 1794, a pit was dug at the end of the garden where the decapitated bodies were thrown in together — noblemen and nuns, grocers and soldiers, labourers and innkeepers. The bodies were brought to the garden by cart and entered the garden via an entryway located at what is now 40, 42 avenue de Saint Mandé. The clothes were removed and inventoried and the bodies were thrown in the pit. The pit was left opened until it was covered and quicklime was spread to counter the odor of decomposing bodies.

At the beginning, compensation for the workmen accomplishing the burials consisted only of the clothes removed from the victims of the guillotine. Later, with so many executions taking place, this was thought to be excessive and the Revolutionary government kept the proceeds from the sale of the clothes of the victims.

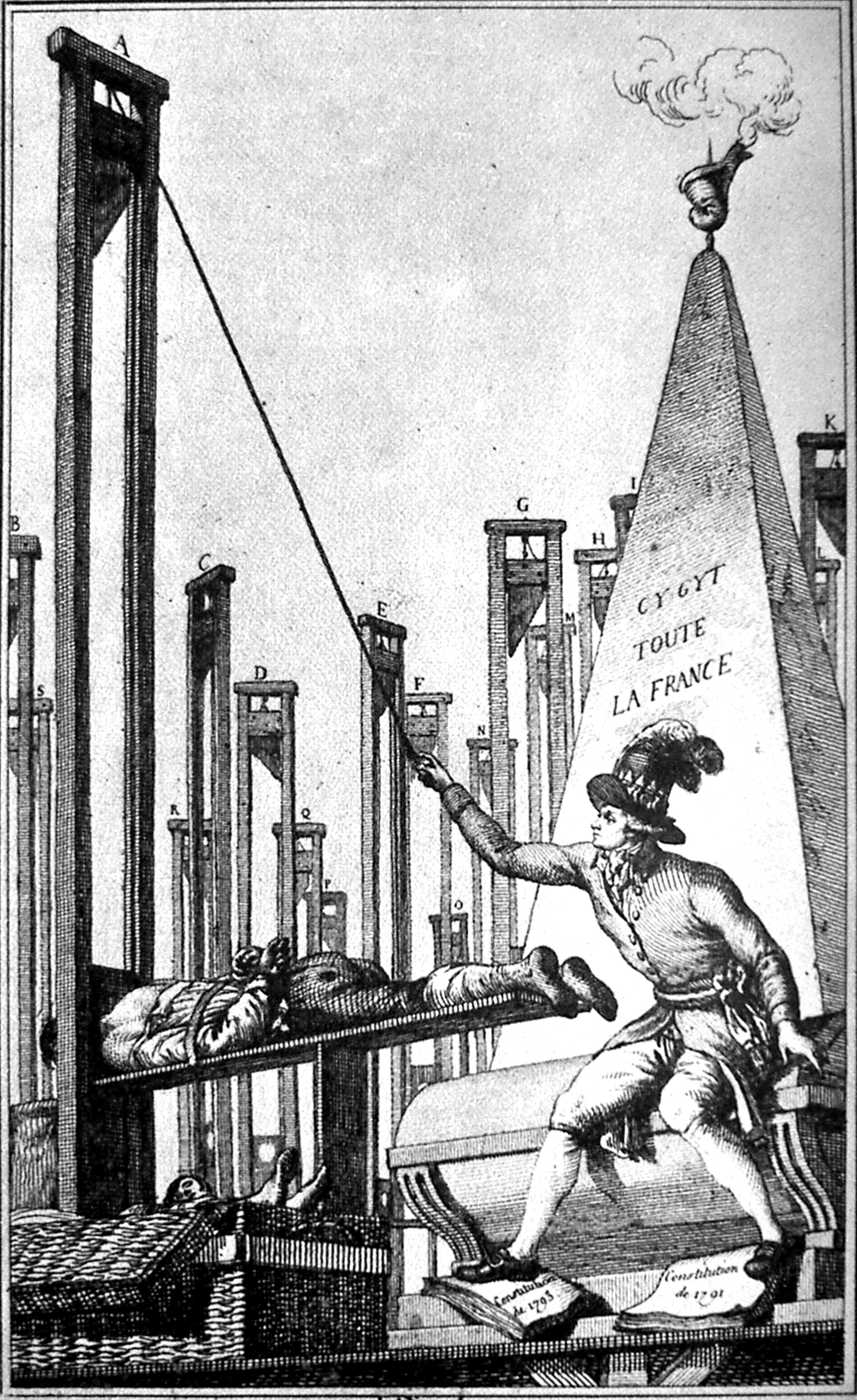
Cartoon showing Robespierre guillotining the executioner after having guillotined everyone else in France.

A second pit was dug a few weeks later when the first filled up. The bodies were tightly packed and the heads were thrown in so as to plug empty spots. Since the plan was to continue executions at a rapid pace in the future, it was felt necessary to use the site efficiently so as to save space for future burials. These plans were not realized, however — the bloodshed stopped when Maximilien Robespierre himself was beheaded on 28 July 1794 (at what is now place de la Concorde), and the garden closed off.

=== Counting the dead ===
The names of those buried in the two common pits, 1,306 men and women, are inscribed on the walls of the chapel in the cemetery complex. Of the 1,109 men, there were 108 nobles, 108 churchmen, 136 monastics (gens de robe), 178 military, and 579 commoners; 197 women are buried there, with 51 from the nobility, 23 nuns and 123 commoners.

Among the women, 16 Carmelite nuns ranging in age from 29 to 78, were brought to the guillotine together, singing hymns as they were led to the scaffold, an incident commemorated in Poulenc's opera, Dialogues of the Carmelites. They were beatified in 1906 as the Martyrs of Compiègne.

=== Discontent with the mass burial site ===
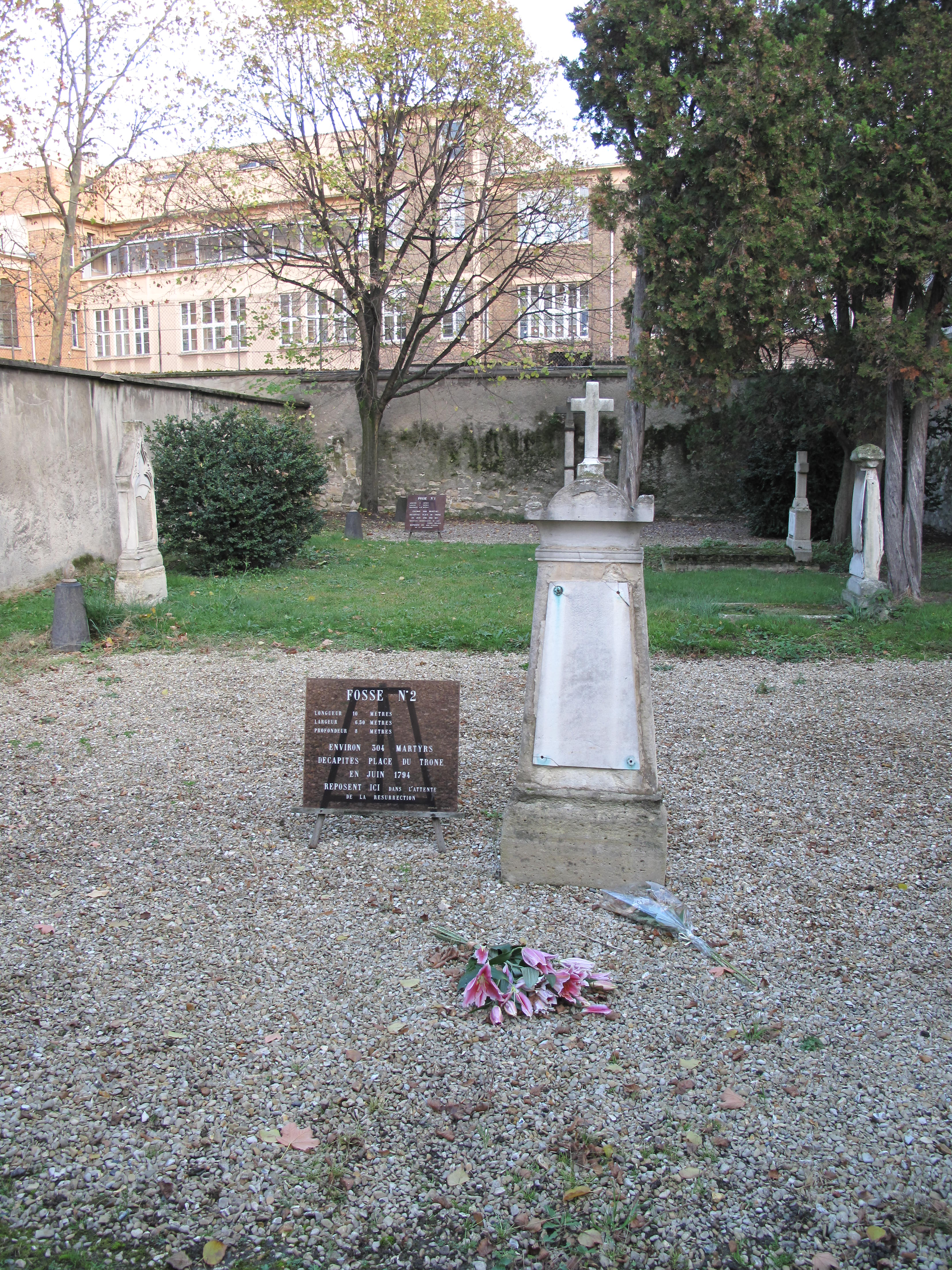
The common graves today, designated by the gravel areas

As noted above, the residents of the surrounding neighbourhood were unhappy about the burial site at Picpus. At the time, it was believed that many diseases were caused by miasmas, or putrid vapours that were associated with bad smells. Therefore, the presence of 1306 corpses in largely open pits was not only unpleasant, it was also thought to entail a risk for public health. Several weeks before the execution of Robespierre (which effectively ended the Terror), the neighbours sent a petition in which they said that they were justly "alarmed by the proximity of these graves, destined for the burials of conspirators who were struck down by the blade of the law". The petition also noted that "those who had been declared enemies of the people and the Republic while they were still alive" are now allowed to "assassinate the people after their death." A second petition, sent a few months after the end of the Reign of Terror, adopts an anti-Robespierre tone: "The patriotes in the vicinity demand in the strongest terms the disappearance of the chasm that was dug on the orders of Robespierre and his accomplices in order to bury their victims."

No attempt was made to move the mass burial site from its current location.

== Post-Revolution ==
=== Creation of a private cemetery ===
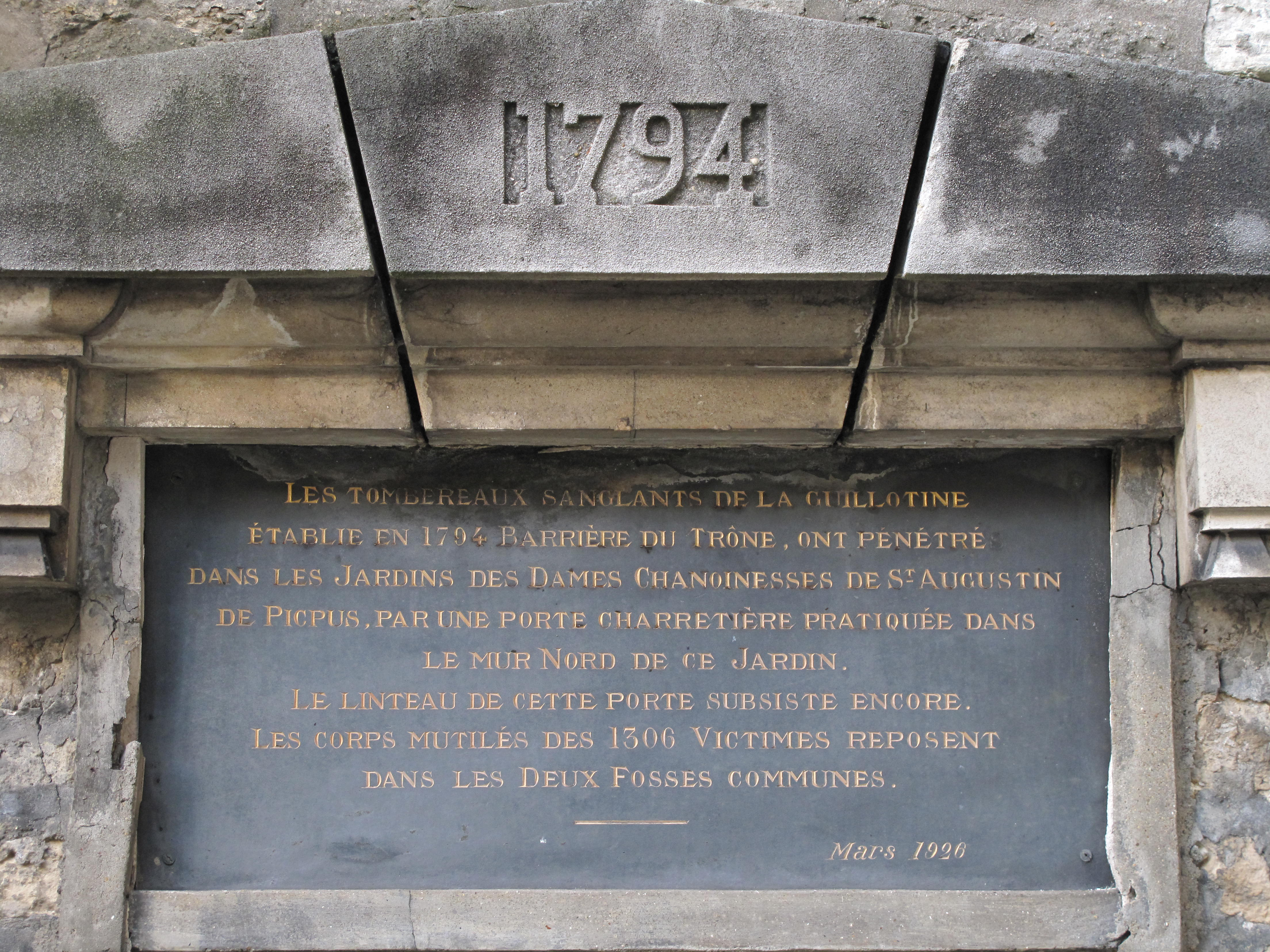
Plaque at Picpus Cemetery dedicated to the victims of the Terror

After the Terror ended, the aristocracy began to return from exile or to leave their hiding places. In 1797, under the Directory, the Picpus site was secretly acquired by Princess Amalie Zephyrine of Salm-Kyrburg, whose brother, Frederick III, Prince of Salm-Kyrburg, was guillotined and buried in one of the common graves.

In the early 1800s, a group of family members (notably, Madame de Lafayette and her sister, Madame de Montagu), launched a search to find the burial place of their loved ones, victims of the Terror. The difficulty of their search was compounded by the fact that most of the surviving aristocracy was still alive only because they had left France during the Terror. Therefore, they were not present for the executions nor were they able to inform themselves immediately about burial sites. According to an article published in 1927 by G. Lenotre, an historian who specialized in this cemetery, the aristocrats were finally able to locate the mass grave in the garden at Picpus with the help of a young commoner who had lost her father and brother to the guillotine and who had followed the cart to the burial site.

The aristocrats decided to form a group of interested parties to buy up the land in order to create a memorial and a private cemetery next to the mass burial site. They bought the garden of Picpus by subscription in June 1802.

In a meeting held in 1802, underwriters designated 11 of them to form a committee to manage the project:

1. Madame de Montagu, née L. D. de Noailles, President
2. Maurice de Montmorency
3. Mr. Aimard de Nicolaï
4. Madame Rebours, née Barville
5. Madame Freteau widow, née Moreau
6. Madame de La Fayette, née Adrienne de Noailles
7. Madame Titon, née Benterot
8. Madame Faudoas, née de Bernières
9. Madame Charton, née Chauchat
10. Philippe de Noailles de Poix
11. Theodule M. de Grammont

Many of these noble families still use the cemetery as a place of burial. Only people whose ancestors were guillotined and buried at Picpus are eligible to be buried in the cemetery. The one exception to this rule is the historian, G. Lenotre (nom-de-plume of Louis Léon Théodore Gosselin; 1855–1935), who wrote a seminal book – Jardin de Picpus – which follows some of the victims on their way to the guillotine and describes what happened subsequently to their bodies and to the garden of Picpus.

=== Creation of a religious community ===
A religious community led by Mother Henriette Aymer de la Chevalerie and Abbé Pierre Coudrin settled in Picpus and rented the pre-existing convent in 1804. The new occupants of the convent were the Sisters of the Congregation of the Sacred Hearts of Mary and Jesus of Perpetual Adoration, whose role was to pray and perform other religious services in memory of the victims and for the redemption of the souls of their executioners.

Later, during the Paris Commune, the community was again afflicted by political violence: the Massacre in the Rue Haxo (French: le massacre de la rue Haxo) was a mass execution of priests and gendarmes by communards during the semaine sanglante ("bloody week") at the end of the Paris Commune in May 1871. During this massacre, 110 priests and gendarmes were executed over a period of several days, including the Picpus Fathers Ladislas Radigue, Polycarpe Tuffier, Marcellin Rouchouze and Frézal Tardieu.

== The Marquis de Lafayette ==
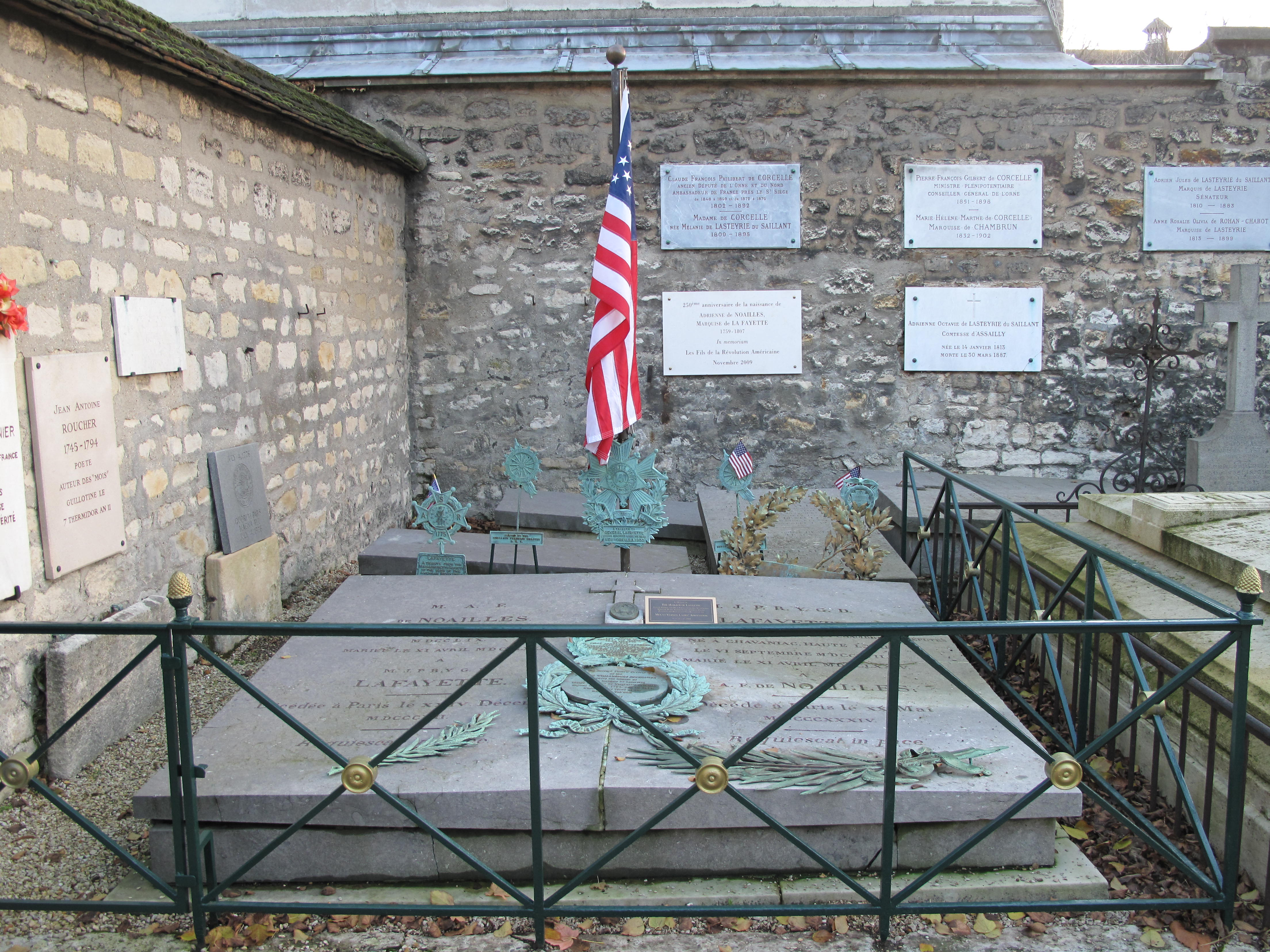
The tomb of the Marquis de Lafayette and his wife in the Picpus Cemetery

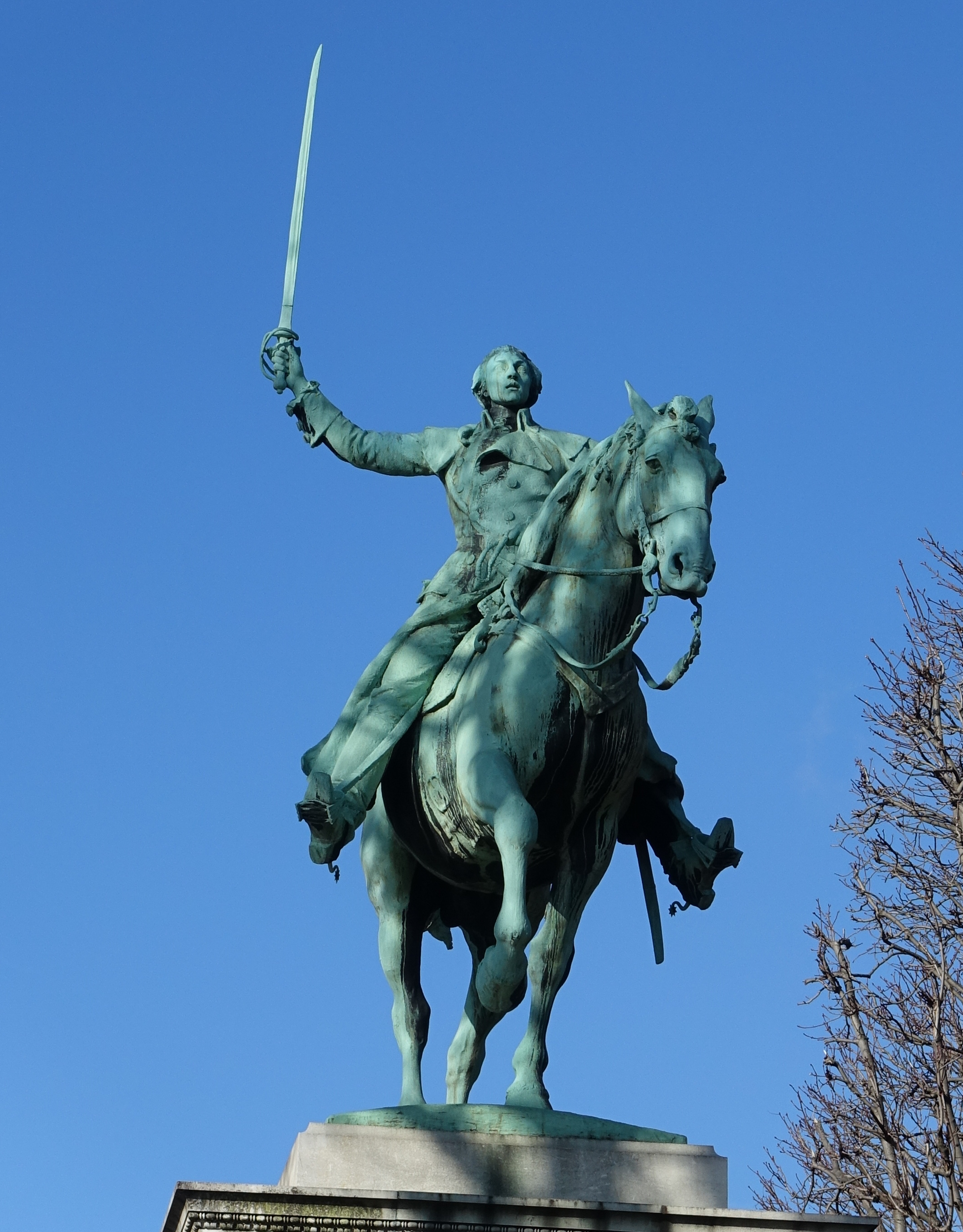
Equestrian Statue of Lafayette, Paris

Arguably, Picpus Cemetery's most famous tomb is that of Gilbert du Motier, Marquis de Lafayette, the French aristocrat and general who was a close friend of many American Founding Fathers including George Washington, Alexander Hamilton, and Thomas Jefferson, with other friends including John Laurens, and fought in the Continental Army even before France officially entered the American Revolutionary War. He died in 1834 from natural causes (pneumonia) at the age of 76.

An American flag always flies over Lafayette's grave courtesy of the local chapter of the Daughters of the American Revolution, and the flag is renewed every Fourth of July by DAR members along with the Society of the Cincinnati and U.S. Embassy officials, who gather at Lafayette's tomb for a celebration. He is buried next to his wife, Adrienne de Lafayette, whose sister, mother and grandmother were among those beheaded and thrown into the common pit. The soil that covers the grave is soil that Lafayette brought home to France from Bunker Hill in Charlestown, Boston – site of the Battle of Bunker Hill, one of the most prominent early battles of the American Revolutionary War; in 1825, on the occasion of the 50th anniversary of the battle, Lafayette had laid the cornerstone of the Bunker Hill Monument.

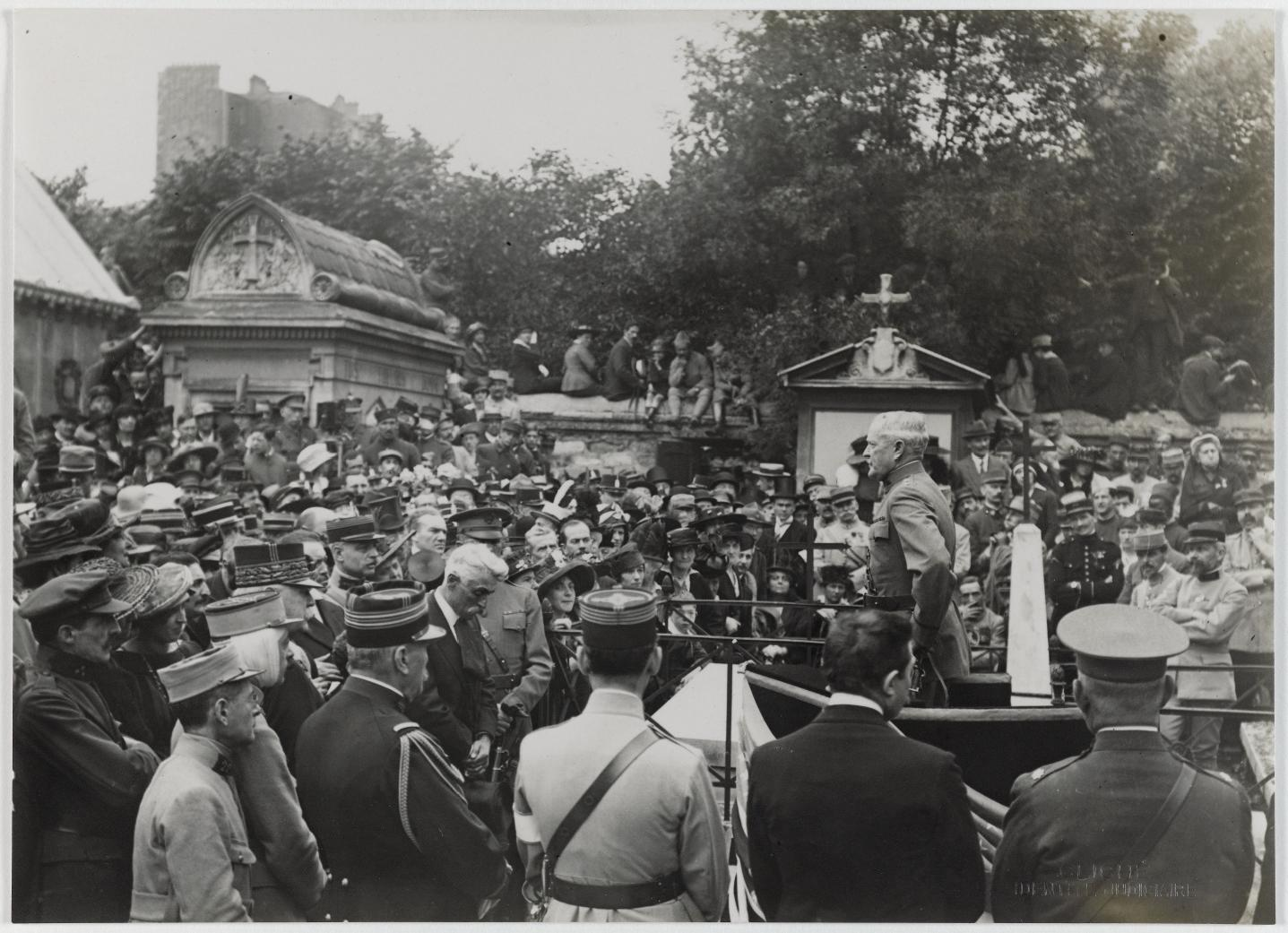
General Pershing at Lafayette's tomb during Independence Day celebrations, 1917

On 4 July 1917, three months after the United States entered World War I on the side of France and her Allies, U.S. Army Colonel Charles E. Stanton visited the General's tomb. Col. Stanton placed an American flag, uttering the famous phrase: "Lafayette, we are here."

America has joined forces with the Allied Powers, and what we have of blood and treasure are yours. Therefore, it is with loving pride that we drape the colors in tribute of respect to this citizen of your great republic. And here and now, in the presence of the illustrious dead, we pledge our hearts and our honor in carrying this war to a successful issue. Lafayette, we are here.

— U.S. Army Colonel Charles E. Stanton

== World War II and protection of interned Jews ==
During the German occupation of Paris, the American flag flew continuously over Lafayette's tomb and the German occupiers never entered the cemetery and convent complex.

In 1852, financier James Mayer de Rothschild built, next door to the cemetery, the Rothschild Hospital and hospice for Jewish patients. Under the collusion of Vichy France with Nazi Germany, its patients who survived their illnesses were all deported to concentration camps. The hospital staff managed to save some of their patients from deportation by making false death certificates or false declarations of stillbirth. The patients were then secreted out of the hospital and hidden in the neighborhood, including in the convent located on the Picpus cemetery grounds.

== Notable burials in the Picpus Cemetery ==
- Marguerite Louise d'Orléans (1645–1721), a Princess of France who became Grand Duchess of Tuscany, as the wife of Grand Duke Cosimo III de' Medici
- 1,306 victims of the Reign of Terror between 14 June and 27 July 1794, including the following:
  - Richard Mique (1728–1794), architect of the Hameau de la reine at the Palace of Versailles, guillotined 8 July 1794
  - The 16 Discalced Carmelite women, Martyrs of Compiègne, guillotined on 17 July 1794 and buried in one of the two mass graves
  - Henriette Anne Louise d'Aguesseau, Duchess of Noailles, Princess of Tingry (1737–1794), a French salon hostess and duchess, guillotined on 22 July 1794, along with her mother-in-law, Catherine de Cossé-Brissac duchesse de Noailles, and daughter, Anne Jeanne Baptiste Louise vicomtesse d'Ayen.
  - Alexandre de Beauharnais (1760–1794), first husband of Joséphine de Beauharnais and father of Eugène and Hortense, guillotined on 23 July 1794
  - Frederick III, Prince of Salm-Kyrburg (1744–1794), German prince, colonel of the German troops, the battalion commander of the Fontaine-Grenelle, brother-in-law of the prince Anton Aloys, Prince of Hohenzollern-Sigmaringen and brother of Princess Amalie Zephyrine, guillotined on 23 July 1794
  - André Chénier (1762–1794), French poet, guillotined on 25 July 1794
  - Jean-Antoine Roucher (1745–1794), poet, guillotined on 25 July 1794, as depicted in the engraving The last wagon
- Gilbert du Motier, Marquis de Lafayette (1757–1834), an important figure in both the French and American revolutions, co-author of the Declaration of the Rights of Man and of the Citizen
- Marie Adrienne Françoise de Noailles, Marquise de La Fayette (1759–1807), French marchioness, wife of the Marquis de Lafayette
- Aimé Picquet du Boisguy (1776–1839), a notably young chouan general at the age of 19 during the French Revolution
- "G. Lenotre" (nom-de-plume of Louis Léon Théodore Gosselin) (1855–1935), French academician, historian and author of many works about the French Revolution, including Jardin de Picpus.

== Location and status ==
The entrance to the cemetery is at 35 rue de Picpus in the 12th arrondissement. It can be visited in the afternoon every day except Sunday and holidays, with hours usually from 2 pm to 5 pm (Admission: €2). The Chapel of Our Lady of Peace is located at the entrance of the cemetery. The nearest Paris metro stations are Nation and Picpus.

This private cemetery and the associated convent were added to the list of Monuments Historiques by the French Ministry of Culture on 30 April 1998.
