= Raymond Léopold Bruckberger =

French Dominican priest, writer, translator, screenwriter

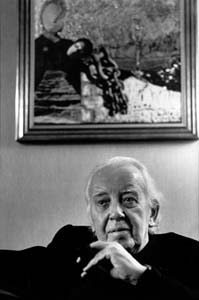

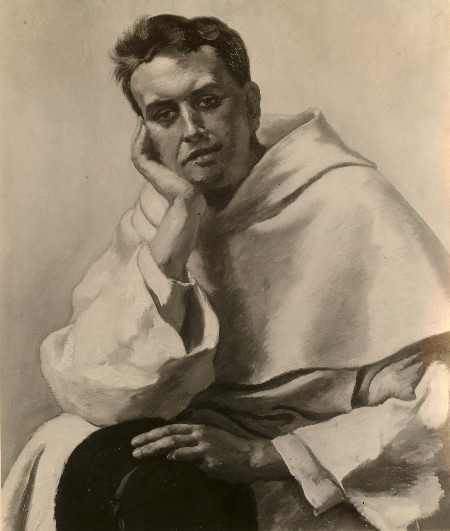
Portrait of Bruckberger by Serge Ivanoff, Paris, c. 1940

Raymond Léopold Bruckberger (French pronunciation: [ʁɛmɔ̃ leɔpɔl(d) bʁykbɛʁʒe]; 10 April 1907 in Murat, Cantal – 4 January 1998 in Fribourg), was a French Dominican priest, Résistance member, writer, translator, screenwriter and director of Austrian heritage.

He was elected member of the Académie des Sciences Morales et Politiques in 1985.

== Publications ==
- The blind clairvoyant with etchings of Elie Grekoff, Cluny, 1948.
- Cossacks and the Holy Spirit, La Jeune Parque, 1951.
- One Sky To Share." The French and American Journals.
- Marie-Madeleine, La Jeune Parque, 1953, Albin Michel, 1975.
- Essay on the American Republic, Gallimard, 1958.
- We n 'go down to the woods, Amiot-Dumont, 1958.
- The Story of Jesus Christ, Grasset and Fasquelle, 1965.
- Spells Mexican SEDIMO, 1966.
- The world upside down. For what I saw, Editions du Cerf, 1971.
- God and Politics, Plon, 1971.
- Saint Francis and the Wolf, GP Editions, 1971
- Open Letter to Jesus Christ, Albin Michel, 1973.
- Puss in Boots and Coat bishop, Plon, 1973.
- Critical review, Minuit, 1976.
- The Donkey and the Ox, Plon, 1976.
- The whole Church clamor, Flammarion. 1977 (weekly column Thursday in L'Aurore in 1976 and 1977, and a few articles published in Le Journal du Dimanche .
- You'll end up on the scaffold, Flammarion, 1978.
- The Gospel new translation. Followed by: Simone Fabien, his faithful collaborator: Comments for the present time, Albin Michel, 1976 Price Chateaubriand .
- Letter to John Paul II, Pope of 2000, stock, 1979.
- The Bachaga, Flammarion, 1980.
- I believe, Grasset, 1981.
- The Revelation of Jesus Christ, Grasset and Fasquelle, 1983.
- Open letter to those who have difficulty in France, Albin Michel, 1984.
- Capitalism, but that's life! Plon, 1984.
- Yes to the death penalty, Plon, 1985.
- Bruck father the devil, Plon, 1986.
- Bernanos alive, Albin Michel, 1988.
- At a time when the shadows lengthen, Albin Michel, 1989.
- Mary, mother of Jesus Christ, Albin Michel, 1991.
