= Place de la Nation =

Square in Paris, France

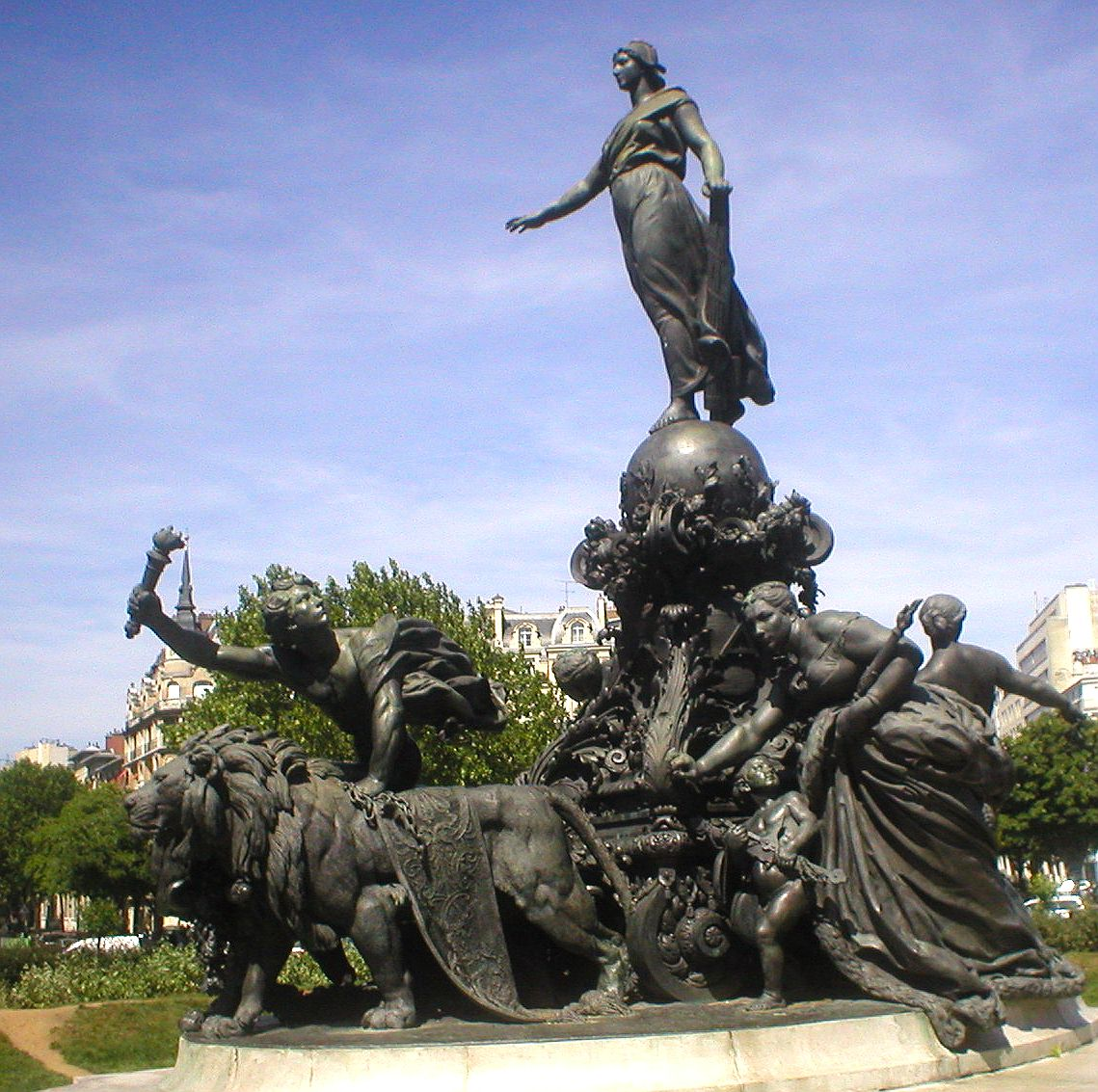
- The Triumph of the Republic by Aimé-Jules Dalou

- Location within Paris
- Length: 252 m (827 ft)
- Width: 252 m (827 ft) (circular with diameter = 252 m)
- Arrondissement: 11th, 12th
- Quarter: Sainte-Marguerite . Picpus
- Coordinates: 48°50′54″N 2°23′45″E
- From: Rue du Faubourg Saint-Antoine
- To: Avenue du Trône

Construction
- Completion: Already present on the Delagrive plan in 1728
- Denomination: 2 July 1880

The Place de la Nation (French pronunciation: [plas də la nɑsjɔ̃]; formerly the Place du Trône [- tʁon] ("Throne Square"), subsequently the Place du Trône-Renversé [- ʁɑ̃vɛʁse] ("Toppled Throne Square") during the French Revolution) is a circle on the eastern side of Paris, between the Place de la Bastille and the Bois de Vincennes, on the border of the 11th and 12th arrondissements. The square acquired its current name on Bastille Day, 14 July 1880, under the Third Republic.

The square includes a large bronze sculpture by Aimé-Jules Dalou, the Triumph of the Republic, depicting the personification of France, Marianne, and is encircled by shops and a flower garden. It is served by the Paris Metro station Nation.

== History ==
=== The Place du Trône and Louis XIV's aborted triumphal arch ===
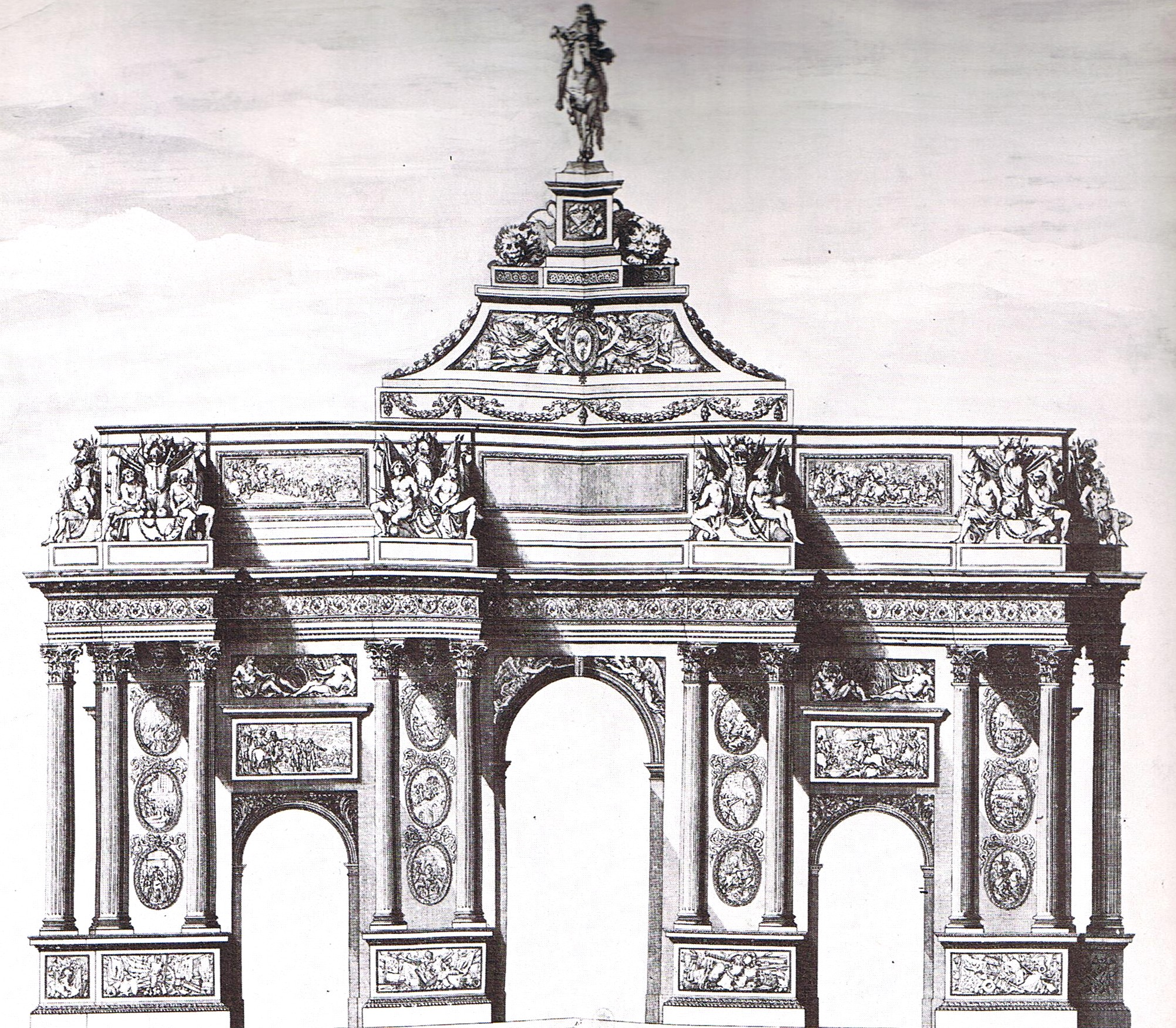
Claude Perrault's winning project for the Place du Trône's triumphal arch, ca. 1670

The space that is now the Place de la Nation first emerged on 26 August 1660, on the occasion of the ceremonial entrance of Louis XIV and his new wife Maria Theresa, following their wedding in Saint-Jean-de-Luz on 9 June 1660. A throne was erected on that spot, which was subsequently known as the Place du Trône ("Throne Square"), a name that survives to the present with the Avenue du Trône and Foire du Trône.

In the late 1660s, Jean-Baptiste Colbert promoted comprehensive reforms and remodeling of Paris, which included the establishment of the Lieutenant général de police in 1667; on the right bank, the demilitarization of the former city walls and their replacement with a ring of Grands Boulevards in 1670; on the left bank, the destruction of all gates of the ancient Wall of Philip II Augustus, started in 1673 and completed in 1683; the unification of professional regulations in the city and its outskirts (French: faubourgs) in 1673; the termination of lingering feudal authority over criminal justice in a number of mostly ecclesiastical enclaves that was transferred to the king's Grand Châtelet in 1674; and the erection or refurbishment of monumental gates on key intersections, namely the Porte Saint-Antoine in 1671, the Porte Saint-Bernard, the Porte Saint-Denis in 1672-1673, and the Porte Saint-Martin in 1674. The project of a massive, four-pillared triumphal arch on the Place du Trône would mark the culmination of this program. A design by Claude Perrault was selected, and the arch's foundations and lower structures were erected in high-quality stone in the 1670s, but the project was abandoned around 1680, possibly for lack of funds. The unfinished structures were demolished in 1716, just after the death of Louis XIV.

The triumphal arch project holds a special place in France's cultural history, as it was the starting point of a public controversy known as the Quarrel of Inscriptions (French: querelle des inscriptions), itself a significant episode of the broader Quarrel of the Ancients and the Moderns that reached its climax a decade later with the production by Charles Perrault, Claude's brother, of his essay on the era of Louis XIV (French: Le Siècle de Louis le Grand). The initial question was whether the inscriptions glorifying Louis on the projected arch should be in ("ancient") Latin or ("modern") French. Antiquarian François Charpentier argued in favor of French inscriptions, and was countered by Jesuit Jean Lucas of the College de Clermont, who defended the option of Latin in an eloquent address pronounced at the College on 25 November 1676 that was published in 1677 under the title De Monumentis Publicis Latine Inscribendis Oratio.

=== Wall of the Fermiers Généraux ===
The Wall of the Fermiers généraux was an enclosure built between 1784 and 1791, one of the several city walls built between the early Middle Ages and the mid 19th century well beyond the buildings of Paris in a campaign to encircle houses, gardens and monasteries for the purpose of controlling the flow of goods and to enable their taxation by the Ferme générale.

The wall's construction left a vast grassy space of vines and market gardens as far as the medieval city wall and the walls of the gardens of the old village of Picpus, which contained large convents, schools and retreats. Originally, the square accommodated two pavilions and two columns of the Barrière du Trône designed by Claude Nicolas Ledoux and built for the barrier of octroi (for tax collection) which surrounded the entrance to the Cours de Vincennes. The columns were surmounted by statues of Kings Philip II and Louis IX.

=== French Revolution ===
During the Revolution, the square was renamed the Place du Trône-Renversé ("Toppled Throne Square"), on 10 August 1792. A guillotine was set up in the southern half of the square, near the Pavilion of Law built by Ledoux. Those guillotined there were buried in the nearby Picpus Cemetery and include:

- André Chénier, 25 July 1794.
- Cécile Renault, Henri Admirat and Jean-Baptiste Michonis, 17 June 1794.
- Josse-François-Joseph Benaut, composer, 13 July 1794.
- The Martyrs of Compiègne, Carmelite nuns, 17 July 1794

=== 19th century ===
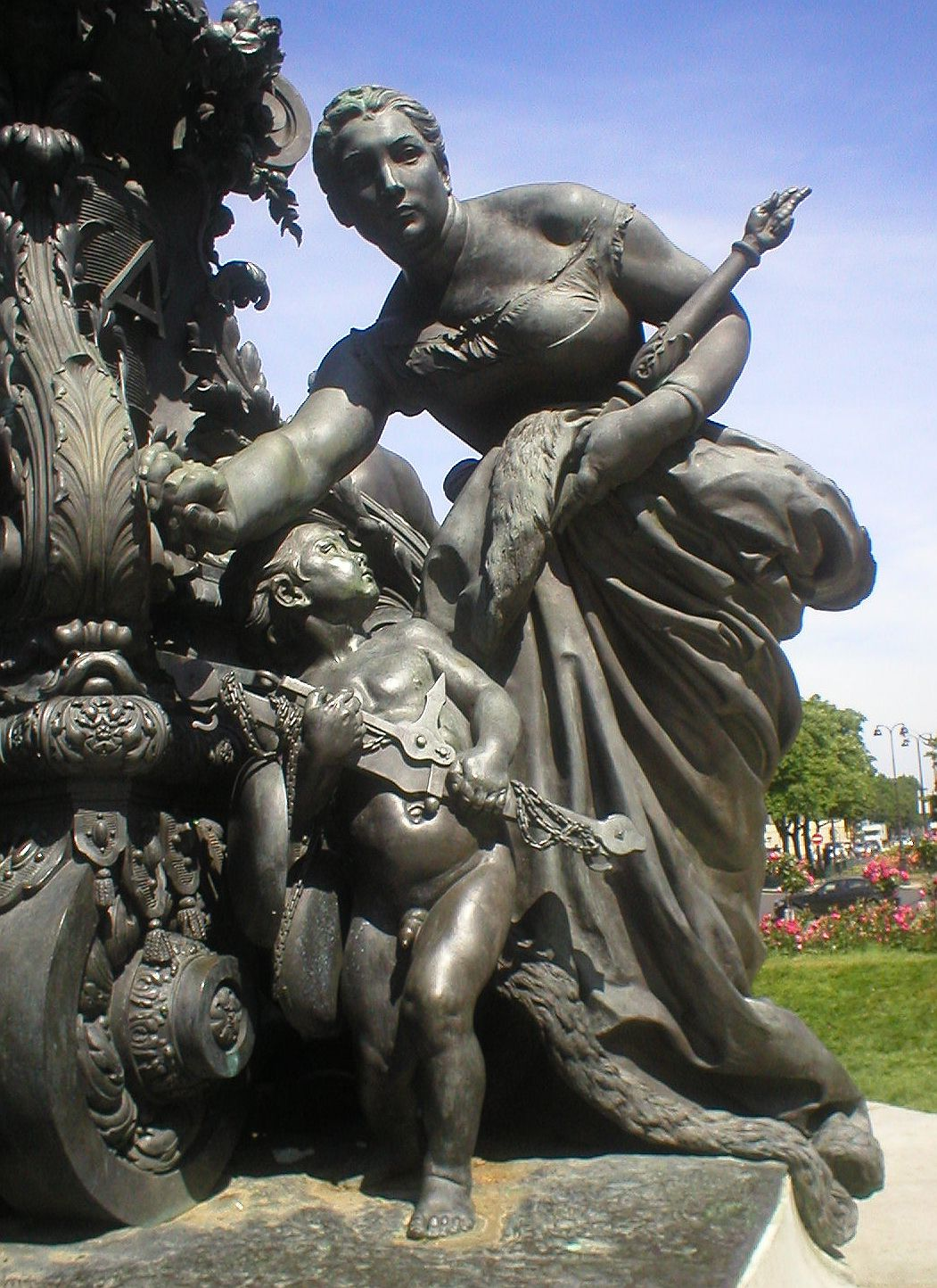
Detail of the Triumph of the Republic

The central monument, The Triumph of the Republic, is a bronze sculpture created by Aimé-Jules Dalou. It was erected to mark the centenary of the Revolution, at first in plaster in 1889 and then in bronze in 1899. The figure of Marianne, personifying the Republic, stands on a globe in a chariot pulled by lions and surrounded by various symbolic figures, and looks towards the Place de la Bastille. When the monument was erected, it was surrounded by a large pond. Additional sculptures of alligators, symbols for the threats to democracy, were removed during the Nazi occupation of Paris and melted down.

=== 20th century ===
On 22 June 1963, the magazine Salut les copains organised a concert at the Place de la Nation, featuring popular singers including Johnny Hallyday, Richard Anthony, Eddy Mitchell and Frank Alamo. It attracted over 150,000 young people.

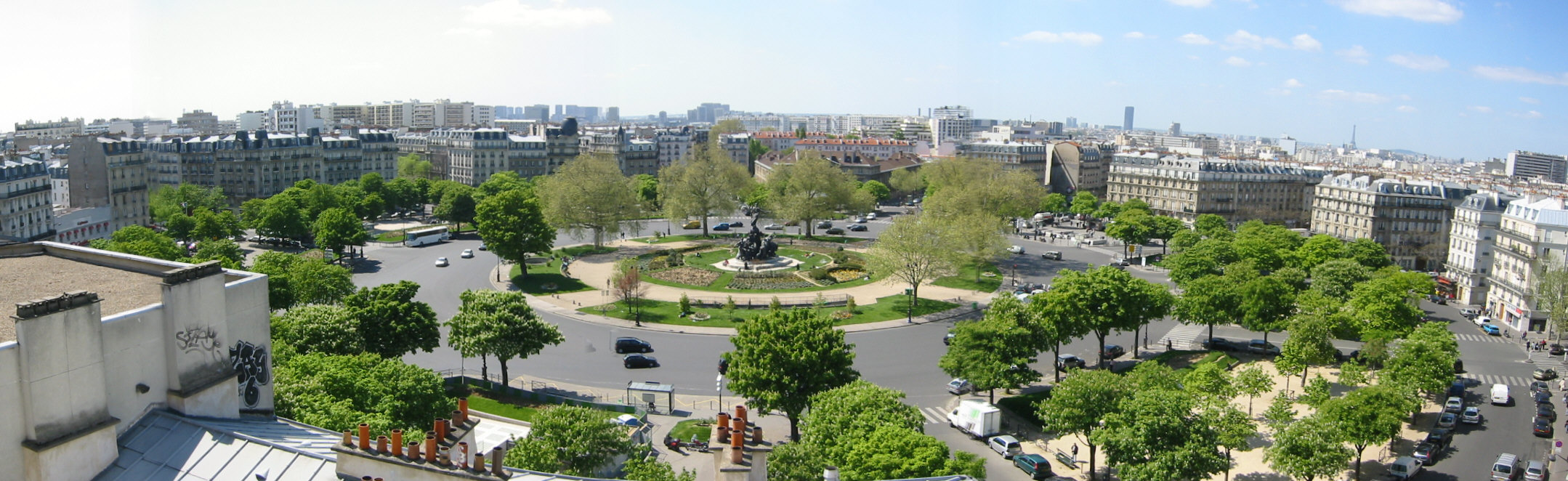
Panoramic view of the Place de la Nation
