= Ihre Hoheit die Tänzerin (disambiguation) =

Ihre Hoheit die Tänzerin can refer to the following:

- Ihre Hoheit, die Tänzerin (operetta), an operetta by Walter Goetze
- Ihre Hoheit die Tänzerin (film), a 1922 German film featuring Béla Lugosi
