= Adrienne Lecouvreur (film) =

1938 film directed by Marcel L'Herbier

- Directed by: Marcel L'Herbier
- Written by: François Porché; Jean-Georges Auriol; Marcel L'Herbier
- Based on: Adrienne Lecouvreur by Eugène Scribe and Ernest Legouvé
- Produced by: Bruno Duday; Georges Lampin
- Starring: Yvonne Printemps; Pierre Fresnay; Junie Astor
- Cinematography: Fritz Arno Wagner
- Edited by: Boris de Fast
- Music by: Maurice Thiriet
- Production company: UFA
- Distributed by: L'Alliance Cinématographique Européenne
- Release date: 27 September 1938
- Running time: 106 minutes
- Countries: France; Germany
- Language: French

Adrienne Lecouvreur is a 1938 French-German biographical film directed by Marcel L'Herbier and starring Yvonne Printemps, Pierre Fresnay and Junie Astor. The film was a co-production between the two countries, and was made at UFA's Berlin Studios. It was based on the 1849 play Adrienne Lecouvreur by Eugène Scribe and Ernest Legouvé about the life of eighteenth century actress Adrienne Lecouvreur.

The film's sets were designed by the art directors Ernst H. Albrecht and Anton Weber.

== Plot ==
A famous actress and a Polish prince have an ill-fated love affair.

== Cast ==
- Yvonne Printemps as Adrienne Lecouvreur
- Pierre Fresnay as Maurice de Saxe
- Junie Astor as the Duchess of Bouillon
- André Lefaur as the Duke of Bouillon
- Jaque Catelain as d'Argental
- Madeleine Sologne as Flora
- Pierre Larquey as Pitou
- Thomy Bourdelle as Pauly
- Jacqueline Pacaud as Fanchon
- Gabrielle Robinne as la Duclos
- Véra Pharès as little Adrienne
- Michèle Alfa as Amour
- Andrée Berty as a lady
- Mme Sabatini as a lady
- Edmond Castel as Folard
- Jean Joffre as the priest
- Philippe Richard as the doctor
- Pierre Juvenet as le gouvernor
- Albert Gercourt as the racketeer
- Geno Ferny as Jasmin
- Roger Blin as the alchemist
- Fernand Bercher as Voltaire
- Marcel André as the ruler
- Jean Worms as the Duke of Chaumont
- Hugues Wanner as Préville
- Michel Vitold as the murderer
- Michel Salina as Carvoy
- Lucien Walter as the hussar
