= Theater des Westens =

Theatre in Berlin, Germany

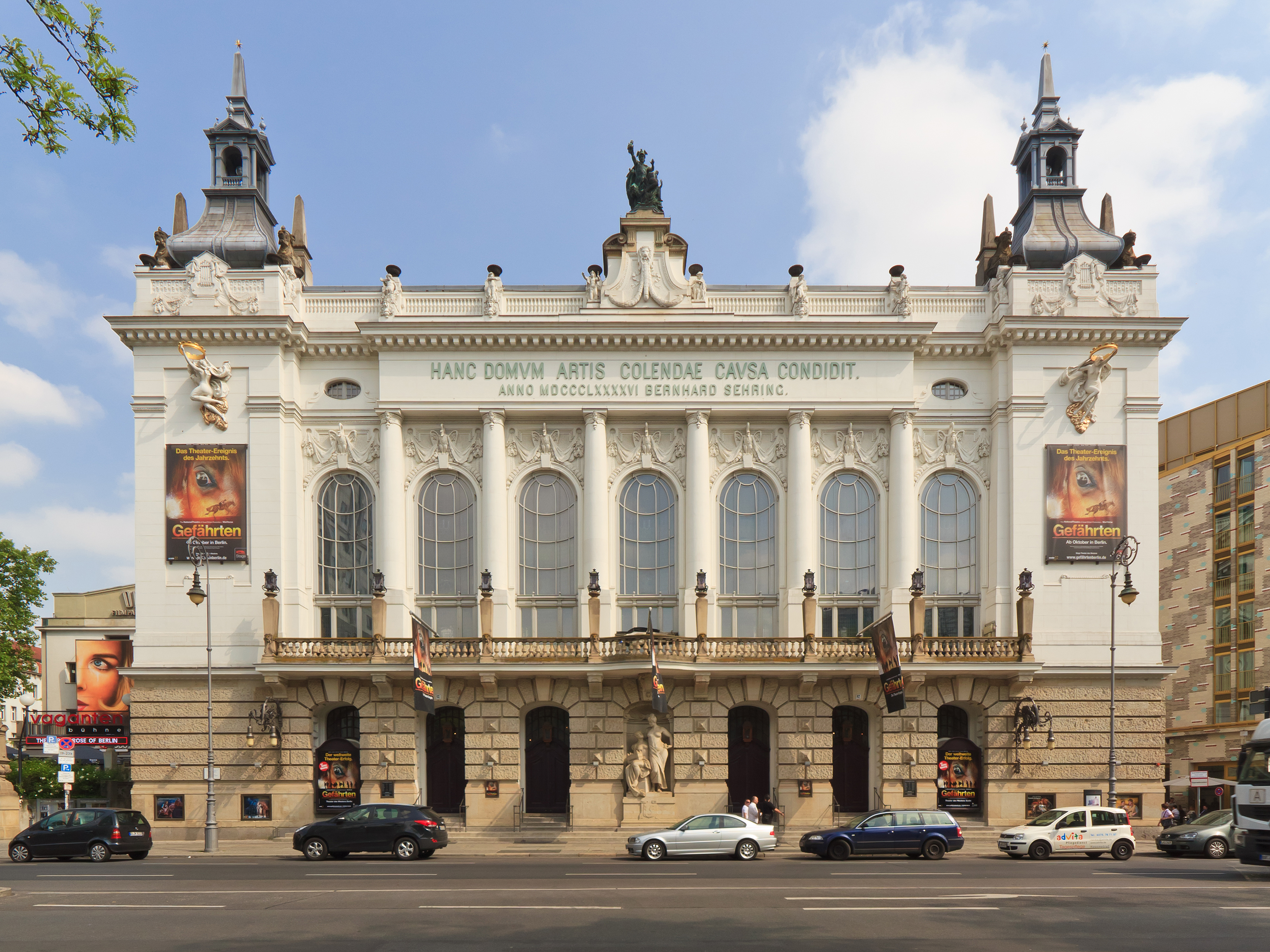
- Interactive map of Theater des Westens
- Address: Kantstraße 10–12; Charlottenburg, Berlin; Germany
- Coordinates: 52°30′21.40″N 13°19′44.62″E
- Owner: State of Berlin (building); Stage Entertainment (productions)
- Capacity: 1712
- Type: Opera house
- Production: Dance of the Vampires

Construction
- Opened: 1 October 1896
- Reopened: 1896
- Rebuilt: 1945
- Architect: Bernhard Sehring

Website
- www.stage-entertainment.de/theater-events/theater-des-westens.html

The Theater des Westens (Theatre of the West) is one of the most famous theatres for musicals and operettas in Berlin, Germany, located at Kantstraße 10–12 in Charlottenburg. It was founded in 1895 for plays. The present house was opened in 1896 and dedicated to opera and operetta. Enrico Caruso made his debut in Berlin here, and the Ballets Russes appeared with Anna Pavlova. In the 1930s it was run as the Volkstheater Berlin. After World War II it served as the temporary opera house of Berlin, the Städtische Oper (Municipal Opera). In 1961 it became the first theatre in Germany to show musicals. Since then it has become the "German equivalent of Broadway extravaganzas", putting on plays and musical comedies.

== History ==
The theatre was founded in 1895. The construction of the present building began in 1896, designed by Bernhard Sehring. It was opened on 1 October 1896 with a fairy tale, Holger Drachmann's Tausendundeine Nacht. From 1898 the house was used for opera, from 1908 for operetta. Enrico Caruso's first appearance in Berlin was in 1905 in Theater des Westens. In 1910, Diaghilev's Ballets Russes performed Carnaval on Schumann's music in a choreography by Mikhail Fokine. Anna Pavlova appeared with the Ballets Russes in 1914.

From 1922, the house was again used as an opera house, called "Große Volksoper" (Great People's Opera), under the direction of conductor Leo Blech. Short lived, the opera house closed in 1924. The theatre then showed a mixed program, under frequently changing management. The dancer Mary Wigman and her company were a great success in 1926. Hans Lüppschütz took over, presenting traditional works including Die Fledermaus and Alt Heidelberg along with new productions. He engaged prominent actors, such as Fritzi Massary in Eine Frau von Format (1927) by Michael Krasznay-Krausz, Max Adalbert in Das Ekel (1928) and Josephine Baker in Bitte Einsteigen (1928).

From 1921, the cabaret theatre in the basement Wilde Bühne was directed by Trude Hesterberg. It was closed in 1928, but reopened in 1931 by Friedrich Hollaender as Tingel-Tangel-Theater. Performers included Marlene Dietrich, Curt Bois, Bertolt Brecht, Erich Mühsam and Theo Lingen.

The theatre was reopened on 23 December 1934 as the Volksoper with Albert Lortzing's Der Waffenschmied. It presented as part of Kraft durch Freude "leichte Muse" (light entertainment), directed by Karl Jöken and his wife Edith Schollwer. Examples include performances such as Alles für Eva, Junger Wein, Lockende Flamme and So zwitschern die Jungen. It had to be closed after an air raid in 1944.

== Städtische Oper ==
After World War II the building served as Berlin's opera house called Städtische Oper, because the Deutsche Oper Berlin had been destroyed in 1943. On 4 September 1945 it was opened by a performance of Beethoven's Fidelio. The general manager was Michael Bohnen, succeeded by Heinz Tietjen. Ferenc Fricsay was the musical director from 1948 to 1952, singers included Dietrich Fischer-Dieskau, Elisabeth Grümmer, Josef Greindl and Ernst Haefliger. Operas by Werner Egk, Boris Blacher and Luigi Nono were premiered during this time, including Hans Werner Henze's König Hirsch on 23 September 1956.

== Musical ==
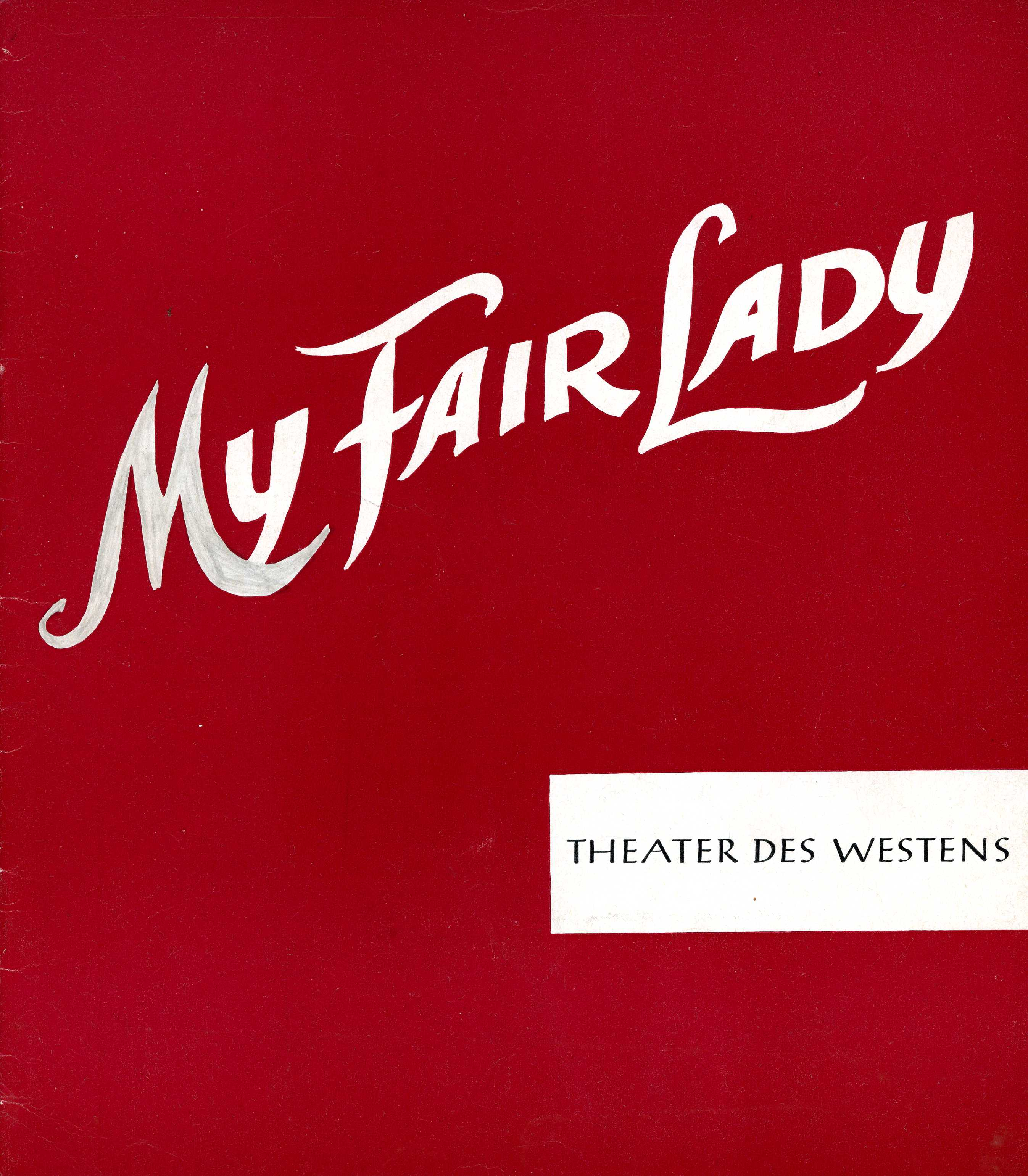
Program My Fair Lady, 1961, beginning of musicals in Germany

When the opera was moved to a new building in 1961, the Theater des Westens specialised in operettas and the new musical. The opening and first musical production was Loewe's My Fair Lady on 1 October 1961, This first performance of the work in German was conducted by Franz Allers who had already conducted the world premiere, the leading roles were performed by Karin Hübner and Paul Hubschmid.

In 1978, the stage technology was improved. In 1981, a restoration of the interior was begun according to the architectural plans of Bernhard Sehring, the facade was restored in 1988. From 1984, Götz Friedrich was intendant and Helmut Baumann artistic director. They concentrated on musicals and were successful with Guys and Dolls and La Cage aux Folles. In 1988 Friedrich staged Porgy and Bess with an "all black-opera". In a united Germany, the theatre faced strong competition and had difficulties in staging an attractive program.

On 24 September 2002, the Senate of Berlin agreed to sell the theatre to Stage Entertainment, while the ownership of the building itself remained in the city. Renovations which began in January 2003 were estimated to have cost 10 million Euros. On 26 September 2003 the theatre opened again with Les Misérables. Stage Entertainment has no ensemble but presents productions of German and international companies.

== Premieres ==
- Leon Jessel: Die beiden Husaren (1913)
- Jean Gilbert: Die Frau im Hermelin (1919)
- Leon Jessel: Schwalbenhochzeit (1921)
- Eduard Künneke: Die lockende Flamme (1933)
- Walter Goetze: Der goldene Pierrot (1934)
- Werner Egk: Circe (1948)
- Boris Blacher: Ein preußisches Märchen (1952)
- Luigi Nono: Der rote Mantel (1954)
- Max Baumann: Pelleas und Melisande (1954)
- Hans Werner Henze: König Hirsch (1956)
- Oskar Sala: Paean (1960)
- Boris Blacher: Rosamunde Floris (1960)
- Rio Reiser: Robinson 2000 (1967)
- James M. Barrie: Peter Pan (1984)
- Birger Heymann: Eins, zwei, drei (1989)
- Jürg Burth / Ulf Dietrich: Blue Jeans (1994)
- Niclas Ramdohr: 30–60–90° durchgehend geöffnet (1999)
- Burkhard Driest: Falco meets Amadeus (2000)
- Konstantin Wecker: Schwejk it easy! (2001)
- Rob Bolland und Ferdi Bolland: 3 Musketiers (2005)
- John von Düffel / Martin Lingnau: Der Schuh des Manitu (2008)

== Literature ==
- Das Charlottenburger Opernhaus von 1912 bis 1961, Dissertation by Detlef Meyer zu Heringsdorf, published by Deutsche Oper Berlin 1988, ISBN 3-926412-07-0
- Deutsches Bühnen-Jahrbuch, published by the Genossenschaft Deutscher Bühnenangehöriger Verlag: Bühnenschriften-Vetriebs-Gesellschaft
