= Ettore Perosio =

Italian composer and conductor

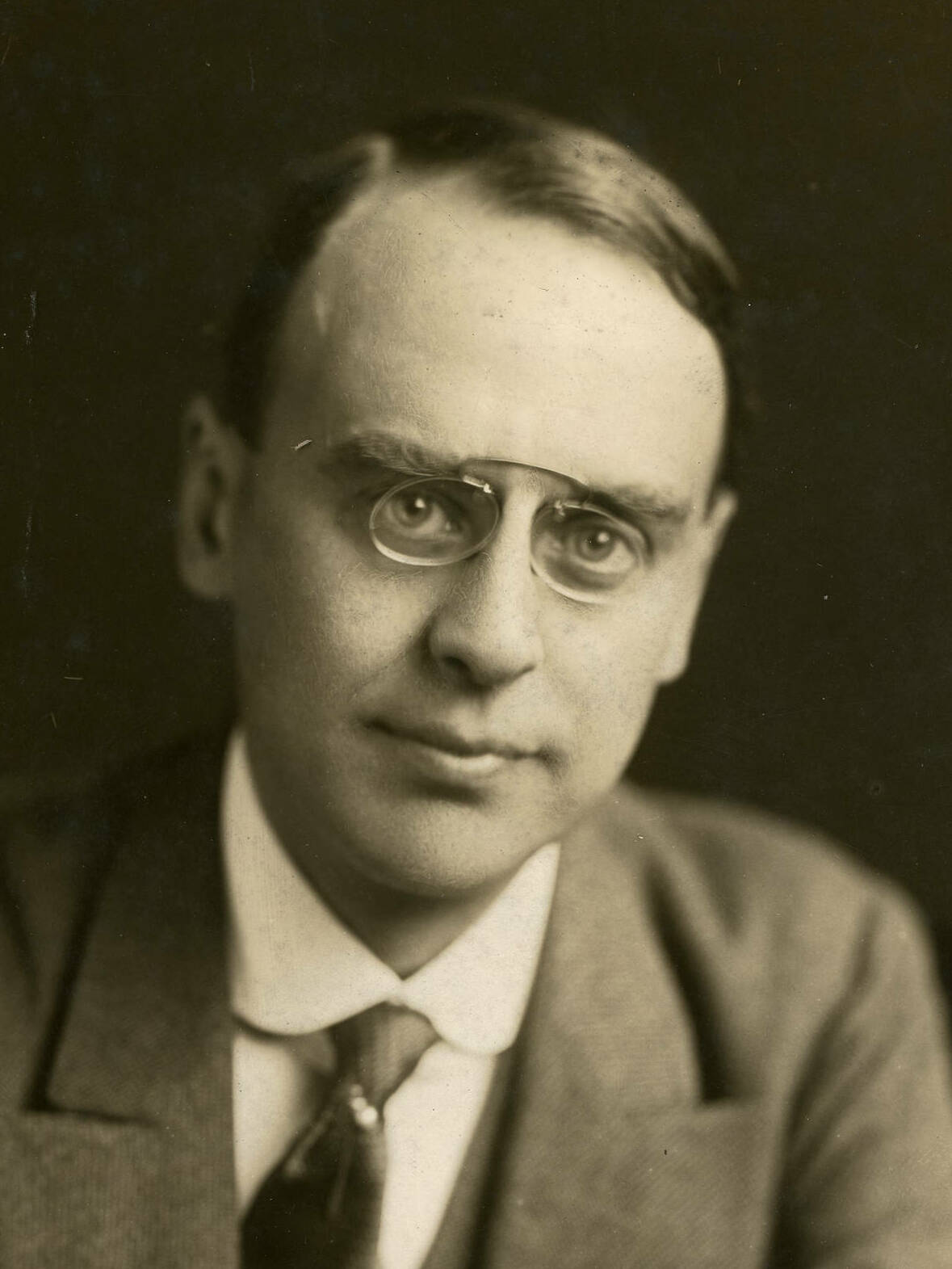
Portrait of Perosio in 1913

Ettore Perosio (May 10, 1868 - February 14, 1919) was an Italian composer and conductor.

Perosio was a native of Genoa, the son of art critic and amateur musician Giuseppe Perosio, who had been a friend of Giuseppe Verdi. The younger Perosio studied at the Niccolò Paganini Institute in Genoa before embarking on a conducting career that took him around Italy, as well as to Spain, Portugal, and the United States. His career also took him to Buenos Aires and Montevideo, where he worked alongside soprano Eugenia Burzio. Perosio married soprano Giuseppina Falconis della Perla (née Battaglia) in 1900. He died in the city of his birth. A plaque in his memory has been erected on the house in which he was born.

Perosio composed five operas during his career. The first of these, premiered at Genoa's Teatro Paganini on January 13, 1889, was Adriana Lecouvreur, to a libretto by his father; based on the same play that later inspired Francesco Cilea, this saw performance in other theaters as well. It was followed on May 27, 1893 by Per l'amore, to a libretto by Iginio Rasi, which bowed at the Teatro Politeama in Genoa. Three other stage works - Furio, to a libretto by Luigi Orsini; Scacco al re, to a libretto by E. Ducati; and Morosina - appear never to have received a performance. Besides operas, Perosio also wrote chamber music, songs, and sacred works. He also produced Apoteosi di Colombo for the inauguration of the Columbian exposition in Genoa in 1892; this was premiered at the Teatro Carlo Felice.
