= Adrienne Lecouvreur (play) =

Play by Ernest Legouvé and Eugène Scribe

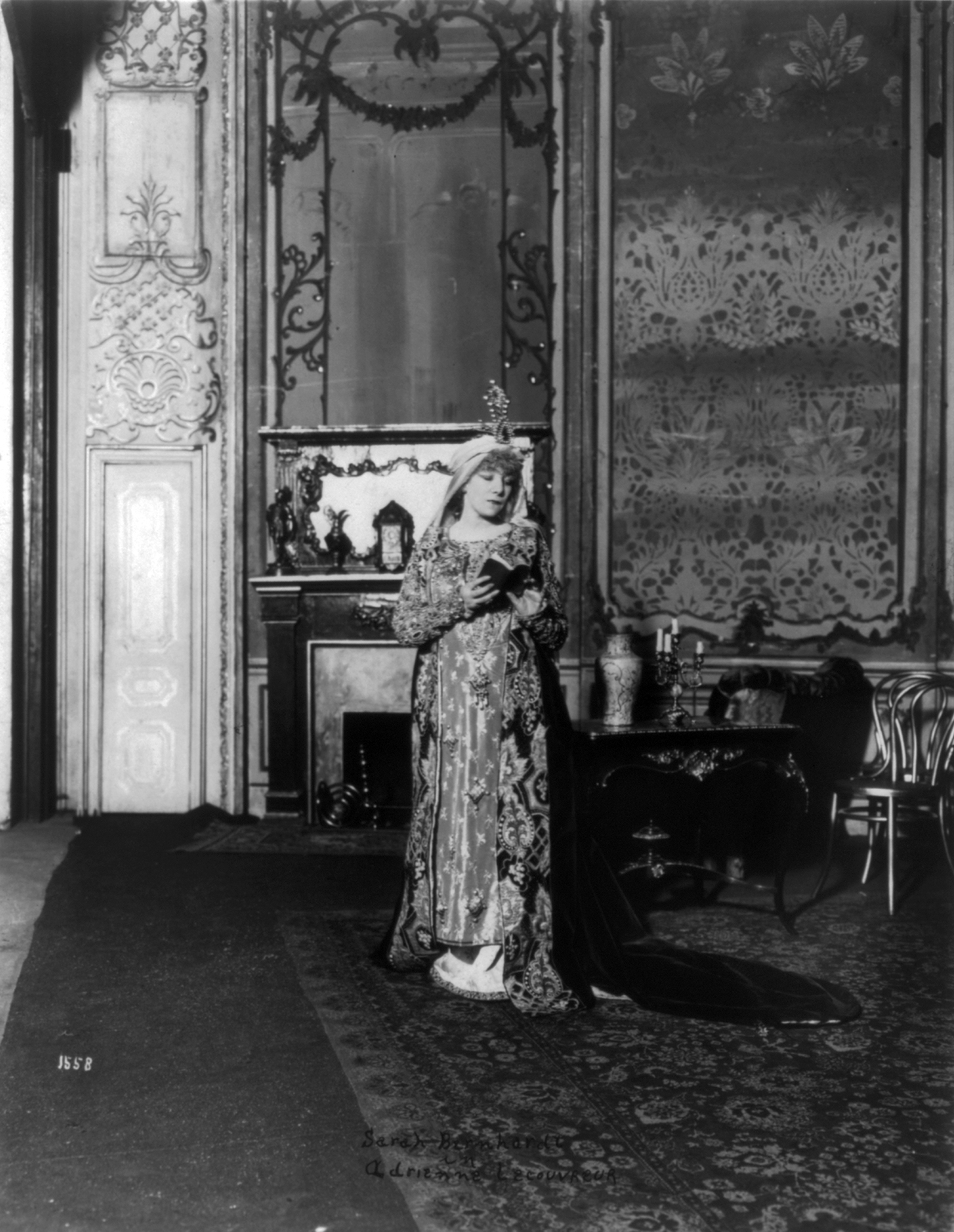
Sarah Bernhardt in Adrienne Lecouvreur (1896)

Adrienne Lecouvreur (French pronunciation: [adʁijɛn ləkuvʁœʁ]) is a French tragic play written by Ernest Legouvé and Eugène Scribe. It portrays the life of the leading French actress of the eighteenth century Adrienne Lecouvreur and her mysterious death. It was produced April 14, 1849.

== Adaptations ==
In 1902 the play was used as the basis for the libretto of the opera Adriana Lecouvreur by Francesco Cilea and Arturo Colautti. It was also the basis of the operetta Adrienne with music by Walter W. Goetze, produced in Hamburg in 1926. There have been a number of film versions of the play including Dream of Love (1928) an American film starring Joan Crawford and Adrienne Lecouvreur (1938) a Franco-German co-production directed by Marcel L'Herbier and starring Yvonne Printemps.

== Films ==
- Adrienne Lecouvreur, directed by Henri Desfontaines and Louis Mercanton (France, 1913, short), starring Sarah Bernhardt
- Adriana Lecouvreur, directed by Ugo Falena (Italy, 1919), starring Bianca Stagno Bellincioni
- The Faces of Love, directed by Carmine Gallone (Italy, 1924), starring Soava Gallone
- Dream of Love, directed by Fred Niblo (1928), starring Joan Crawford
- Adrienne Lecouvreur, directed by Marcel L'Herbier (France, 1938), starring Yvonne Printemps
- Adriana Lecouvreur, directed by Guido Salvini (Italy, 1955), starring Valentina Cortese

== Bibliography ==
- Forman, Edward. Historical dictionary of French theater. Scarecrow Press, 2010.
