= Der goldene Pierrot =

1934 German operetta

Der goldene Pierrot (The Golden Pierrot) is a German-language operetta in eight scenes by Walter Goetze to a libretto by Oskar Felix and Otto Kleinert. It premiered on 31 March 1934 at the Theater des Westens in Berlin.

== Roles ==
Roles, voice types, premiere cast
Role	Voice type	Premiere cast, 31 March 1934
Peter Sander, vineyard owner	spoken	
Edith, his daughter	soprano	Edith Schollwer
Horst Brenkendorf	tenor	Carl Jöken
Ferdi Larsen	tenor	Kurt Vespermann
Grit Wasconi, film actress	soprano	Genia Nikolajewa
Mina, Edith's maid		
Heinrich Schmitz		
Radio reporter		
Maître d'		
Jester		
Masked people, ladies and gentlemen, wine growers, musicians, waiters

== Synopsis ==
Time and place: A large city by the Rhine, the present

It is the Carnival season, and the Elferrat, the Carnival's organising council, especially its chairman Peter Sander, is a bit perturbed by the regular appearance at every masquerade ball by a rather entertaining young female in the mask of a golden pierrot. No one, least of all the strict Sander, suspects his daughter Edith.

So far, Pierrot managed to avoid being unmasked, although it sometimes takes considerable wit. And so it is again today, when being cornered, she seeks help from a perfect stranger and pretends to be his wife. During the following conversation she learns that the man is in fact Horst Brenkendorf who her father has selected as her future husband. Horst is enchanted by this cheery female in the Pierrot mask, and confides to her that his future bride has been described to him as rather humdrum and plain. They promise to see each other again.

The next day Horst pays a visit to Peter Sander, and Edith, whom Horst fails to recognize, plays the role of the rather dull maiden. Disappointed by his future bride, he is even more captivated by Pierrot when they meet again at a ball that evening.

Six months later Horst and Edith marry. On the wedding day, he surprisingly receives a billet-doux from Pierrot, inviting him to the tryst they promised each other at the ball. Horst is reluctant to go, but when he recognizes Pierrot's true identity from the ring she wears, he decides to go. Edith is bitterly disappointed by her husband's apparent willingness to cheat on her on her wedding day and breaks out in tears. Horst then ends the cruel play and reveals that he has seen through her disguise – echoes of Susanna and Figaro in act 4 of Mozart's The Marriage of Figaro.

== Notable arias ==
- Goldener Pierrot, eine Nacht mit dir
- Viel schöne Frauen gibt's im bunten Liebesgarten
- Wer am Rosenmontag an Aschermittwoch denkt (duet)
- Sei pünktlich, und lass mich nicht warten
- Man spielt nicht mit Herzen
- Tanzen will jedes Mädel
- Die Welt ist schön und muss sich drehn (Grit)
- Den ersten Walzer hat erdacht der Mann im Mond
