= Dream of Love =

1928 film by Fred Niblo

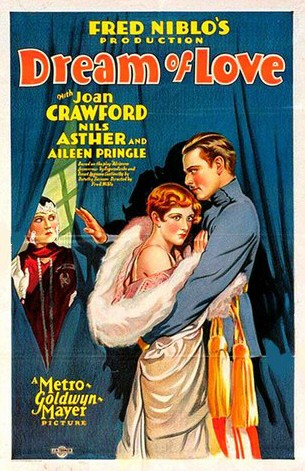
- Original Film Poster
- Directed by: Fred Niblo
- Screenplay by: Dorothy Farnum; Marian Ainslee (titles); Ruth Cummings (titles)
- Based on: Adrienne Lecouvreur by Ernest Legouvé and Eugène Scribe
- Produced by: Fred Niblo
- Starring: Joan Crawford; Nils Asther; Aileen Pringle; Warner Oland
- Cinematography: Oliver T. Marsh; William H. Daniels
- Edited by: James C. McKay
- Distributed by: Metro-Goldwyn-Mayer
- Release date: December 1, 1928
- Running time: 65 minutes
- Country: United States
- Languages: Sound (Synchronized); English intertitles
- Budget: $221,000
- Box office: $571,000

Dream of Love is a 1928 American synchronized sound biographical drama film directed by Fred Niblo, and starring Joan Crawford and Nils Asther. While the film has no audible dialog, it was released with a synchronized musical score with sound effects using both the sound-on-disc and sound-on-film process. The sound was recorded via the Western Electric sound system. The film is based on the 1849 French tragedy Adrienne Lecouvreur by Eugène Scribe and Ernest Legouvé.

In the film, Asther plays Prince Maurice de Saxe and Crawford plays Adrienne Lecouvreur, a Gypsy performer, in a tale of lost love and revenge. Dream of Love is now considered lost.

== Plot ==
Adrienne Lecouvreur, a vibrant and passionate Gypsy girl in a traveling carnival, meets Prince Mauritz de Saxe, the crown prince of a Balkan kingdom, who is journeying incognito. She falls deeply in love with him almost instantly, overwhelmed by his noble bearing and quiet melancholy. The prince, amused and briefly enchanted, accepts her affection, but his feelings are distant, and his thoughts are elsewhere—bound by duty and decorum.

After spending a night in Adrienne’s carnival wagon during a thunderstorm, he leaves without saying goodbye. He sends her a farewell letter through his aide, wishing her well. Unbeknownst to Mauritz, his aide, believing he’s offering a generous gesture, slips a banknote into the envelope. When Adrienne opens it, her heart breaks. She believes her love has been purchased, and that she has been dismissed not only coldly, but as a common thing.

Years pass. The World War comes and goes, reshaping Europe’s monarchies and empires. Mauritz returns to his homeland stripped of his throne, living in exile, while a dictator, the Duke, now holds power in Kuromme. The dictator’s wife, the Duchess, is influential and politically connected, and secretly in love with Mauritz.

Royalist supporters conspire to restore the prince, and Mauritz, urged by advisors such as Michonet and Ivan, allows himself to be seduced by the Duchess. He plays along with her affection as part of a calculated political maneuver to win back his position.

Meanwhile, Adrienne has become a famed stage actress, renowned across Europe. Her brilliance on stage mirrors the passion she once poured into her love for Mauritz. In Paris, the two meet again. Adrienne is stunned to see him in person after so many years. Mauritz, now older and finally understanding his own feelings, begs Adrienne to marry him. For a moment, it seems the past could be undone.

But Adrienne still bears the wound of that long-ago heartbreak. She returns to Mauritz the banknote he never knew had been enclosed in his letter—a quiet but devastating symbol of what their love could never be. Mauritz is horrified, realizing how deeply he had unknowingly wounded her.

Word of their renewed closeness reaches the Duchess. Enraged with jealousy and betrayal, she denounces Mauritz and orders him executed. Soldiers seize him and prepare to carry out the sentence. He is lined up before a firing squad. At the last moment, the soldiers revolt, refusing to carry out the order. The populace rises. The dictator is overthrown, and Mauritz, supported by the Royalists and the people, ascends to the throne.

Now crowned King, Mauritz longs to stand beside Adrienne not just in love, but in life. But the rules of royalty are unbending. He cannot marry a woman of common birth, not even one as extraordinary as she. In a final bittersweet parting, Adrienne returns to the world of the theater. She knows they will never be joined in name—but in heart, she remains his chosen, his beloved. And as she steps once more into the spotlight, she is content in the knowledge that she is more than a queen—she is the king’s true love before God.

== Cast ==
- Nils Asther as Prince Maurice de Saxe
- Joan Crawford as Adrienne Lecouvreur
- Aileen Pringle as The Duchess
- Warner Oland as The Duke, Current Dictator
- Carmel Myers as The Countess
- Harry Reinhardt as Count
- Harry Myers as The Baron
- Alphonse Martell as Michonet
- Fletcher Norton as Ivan

== Music ==
The sound version featured a theme song entitled “Love O’ Mine” which was composed by Ernst Luz and published as sheet music by Robbins.

== Box office ==
According to MGM records the film earned $339,000 in the US and Canada and $232,000 elsewhere resulting in a profit of $138,000.

== See also ==
- List of early sound feature films (1926–1929)
