= Madame Butterfly (1954 film) =

1954 film directed by Carmine Gallone

- Italian film poster
- Italian: Madama Butterfly
- Directed by: Carmine Gallone
- Screenplay by: Carmine Gallone; Iwao Mori
- Based on: Madama Butterfly (1904 opera) by Giacomo Puccini
- Produced by: Guido Luzzatto; Angelo Rizzoli; Nagamasa Kawakita; Iwao Mori
- Starring: Kaoru Yachigusa; Nicola Filacuridi; Michiko Tanaka
- Cinematography: Claude Renoir
- Edited by: Niccolò Lazzari
- Music by: Giacomo Puccini
- Production companies: Rizzoli Film; Toho; Produzione Gallone
- Distributed by: Dear Film (Italy); Toho (Japan)
- Release dates: 29 December 1954 (Italy); 3 June 1955 (Japan)
- Running time: 81 minutes
- Countries: Italy; Japan
- Language: Italian

Madame Butterfly (Italian: Madama Butterfly) is a 1954 musical film directed by Carmine Gallone, based on the 1904 opera Madama Butterfly with music by Giacomo Puccini and libretto by Luigi Illica and Giuseppe Giacosa. It stars Kaoru Yachigusa, Nicola Filacuridi, and Michiko Tanaka, with their singing voices dubbed by professional opera singers. The film was an international co-production between Italian producer Angelo Rizzoli and Japanese studio Toho.

== Cast ==
Role	Voice type	Actor	Singing voice
Cio-cio-san	soprano	Kaoru Yachigusa	Orietta Moscucci
Pinkerton	tenor	Nicola Filacuridi	Giuseppe Campora
Suzuki	mezzo-soprano	Michiko Tanaka	Anna Maria Canale
Sharpless	baritone	Ferdinando Lidonni	Ferdinando Lidonni
Goro	tenor	Kiyoshi Takagi	Paolo Carloni
Bonze	tenor	Yoshio Kosugi	Plinio Clabassi
Yamadori	tenor	Tetsu Nakamura	Adelio Zagonara
Kate Pinkerton	mezzo-soprano	Josephine Corry	Maria Marcangeli

== Production ==
Madame Butterfly was shot at Cinecittà Studios in Rome between October and December 1954.

== Release ==
Madame Butterfly was distributed theatrically in Japan on 3 June 1955. It was released in the United States by I.F.E. in Italian with English subtitles on 23 April 1956. It was reissued in 1970 by Cinemation Industries.
