= Plinio Clabassi =

Italian opera singer (1919–1984)

Plinio Clabassi (photo with 1950 dedication)

Plinio Clabassi (1919–1984) was an Italian operatic bass particularly associated with the Italian repertoire.

== Life and career ==
Plinio Clabassi in Mefistofele (1950 photo dedication)

Born in Gradisca di Sedegliano, Italy, Plinio Clabassi began to sing at an early age with his native city's men's chorus, "Cantario Santo Stefano", of which he was director from 1946 to 1947. During the Second World War, he served in the campaign of Albania. After the war, he joined the Granatieri di Sardegna Mechanized Brigade in Rome. It was during that period that he began his operatic career on local radio broadcasts (RAI).

He soon was invited to sing at most of the opera houses and concert halls throughout Italy. His career of some thirty years would also take him to many European countries, to North and South America, as well as to South Africa and Australia. His repertoire was vast, ranging from Caldara and Paisiello to Pizzetti and Alfano, and also including Mussorgsky, Mascagni, Max von Schillings, and Renato Chiesa, but he was mostly admired for the 19th-century romantic works by composers such as Donizetti, Bellini, Verdi, and Puccini.

A basso cantante with a beautiful even voice, he was admired for his scenic intelligence and dignity. He can be heard on several studio and live recordings. Clabassi was married to opera singer Rina Gigli (the daughter of Beniamino Gigli), with whom he appeared on a number of occasions, including a 1966 production of Turandot at the Teatro San Carlo in Naples.

Plino Clabassi died in San Vito al Tagliamento, on 22 October 1984. In May 2012, a new theatre in his native city was named in his honour.

== Selective discography ==
Most of his recorded work consists of secondary characters and small roles in operas, such as Monterone in Rigoletto, Lodovico in Otello, the Speaker of the Temple in The Magic Flute, the Old Monk who turns out to be Carlo Quinto in Don Carlo, and the King of Egypt in Aida.

- 1953 – The Magic Flute (Il Flauto Magico), Karajan (Walhall Eternity Series)
- 1954 – La forza del destino, Serafin (EMI)
- 1954 – Don Carlo, Santini (EMI)
- 1955 – Madame Butterfly, Karajan (EMI)
- 1955 – Aida, Perlea (RCA)
- 1955 – Rigoletto, Serafin (EMI)
- 1955 – Il Tabarro, Bellezza (EMI)
- 1958 – Anna Bolena, Gavazzeni (Myto)
- 1958 – La forza del destino, Previtali (Decca)
- 1958 – La Gioconda, Previtali (Decca)
- 1961 – Aida, Solti (Decca)

== Opera DVDs ==
- 1956 – La sonnambula (VAI)
- 1957 – Il trovatore (Hardy Classics)
- 1958 – Turandot (VAI)
- 1967 – Lucia di Lammermoor (VAI)
