= Elena Nicolai =

Bulgarian opera singer (1905–1993)

- Elena Nicolai as Ortruda in Lohengrin, Teatro alla Scala, Milan, 1939 (photo with dedication)
- Born: Stoyanka Savova Nikolova
- Occupation: operatic mezzo-soprano

Stoyanka Savova Nikolova (Bulgarian: Стоянка Савова Николова), best known by her stage name Elena Nicolai (Bulgarian: Елена Николай) (24 January 1905 – 24 October 1993), was a Bulgarian operatic mezzo-soprano.

== Early life and training ==
Elena Nicolai (1948)

Nicolai was born in the village of Tzerovo, Pazardzhik, Bulgaria. She spent her childhood in another Bulgarian town, Panagurishte. At the age of 19, she moved to Milan to study opera, first with Vincenzo Pintorno and later with Ettore Pozzoli.

== Roles sung ==
- Annina, Der Rosenkavalier
- Laura, La Gioconda (opera)
- La Cieca, La Gioconda (opera)
- Nefte, Il figliuol prodigo (List of operas by Ponchielli)
- Principessa di Bouillon, Adriana Lecouvreur
- Rubria, Nerone (Boito)
- Ortrud, Lohengrin (opera)
- Dalila, Samson and Delilah (opera)
- Brunnhilde, Die Walkure
- Amneris, Aida
- Eboli, Don Carlo
- Azucena, Il Trovatore
- Adalgisa, Norma
- Leonora, La Favorita
- Carmen, Carmen
- Brangaene, Tristan und Isolde
- Santuzza, Cavalleria Rusticana
- Fedora, Fedora
- Klytaemnestra, Elektra

== Recordings ==
- Monteverdi - L'Orfeo (Silvia, 1939) conducted by Ferrucio Calusio, Italian HMV
- Cilea - Adriana Lecouvreur (Principessa di Bouillon, 1949) conducted by Federico Del Cupolo, Colosseum
- Mascagni - Cavalleria rusticana (Santuzza, 1953) conducted by Franco Ghione, Decca
- Verdi - Don Carlo (Principessa d'Eboli, 1954) conducted by Gabriele Santini, HMV/EMI
- Verdi - La forza del destino (Preziosilla, 1954) conducted by Tullio Serafin, Columbia/EMI

== Films ==
- Il Boom, directed by Vittorio De Sica (1963)
- My Wife (episode "I miei cari," directed by Mauro Bolognini) (1964)
- Sedotti e bidonati, directed by Giorgio Bianchi (1964)
- Latin Lovers (episode "L'irreparabile," directed by Mario Costa) (1965)
- Our Husbands (episode "Il marito di Roberta," directed by Luigi Filippo D'Amico) (1966)
- Quando dico che ti amo, directed by Giorgio Bianchi (1967)
- Be Sick... It's Free, directed by Luigi Zampa (1968)

== Honours ==
Nicolai Peak in Antarctica is named after Elena Nicolai.

== Bibliography ==
- Nicolai, Elena (1993). La mia vita fra i grandi del melodramma. Parma: Azzali. p. 200.
