= Janet Coster =

English opera singer

Janet Coster is an English operatic mezzo-soprano.

Born in London, the daughter of a London Transport employee, Coster studied at the Guildhall School of Music and privately with Eva Turner. In the 1960s she undertook a number of roles at Covent Garden including the boy in the 1966 production of Modest Mussorgsky's Boris Godunov with Boris Christoff in the title role.

In 1969 Coster joined the roster of principal artists at the Cologne Opera, making her debut there as Vitellia in a new production of Mozart’s La clemenza di Tito. At that time this particular Mozart opera was rarely performed and the production, directed by Jean Pierre Ponnelle, received high acclaim from music critics internationally.

In 1975 she sang a brilliant Eboli in the Cologne Opera's production of Verdi's "Don Carlos".

She also sang with Welsh National Opera to great acclaim in roles such as Azucena in Trovatore.

Over the next decade she sang a wide number of roles at this theatre and other German houses. Returning to Britain she was Amneris in Aida for the English National Opera and undertook a considerable amount of Broadcasting for the BBC.

Her sister Tammy St. John had some success as a popular singer.

== Recordings ==
Coster has participated in a number of important recordings, including Léonard in Les Huguenots by Meyerbeer with a cast including Dame Joan Sutherland, Dame Kiri te Kanawa and Martina Arroyo and Adriana Lecouvreur by Cilea with Montserrat Caballé.
