= Giuseppe Campora =

Italian operatic tenor

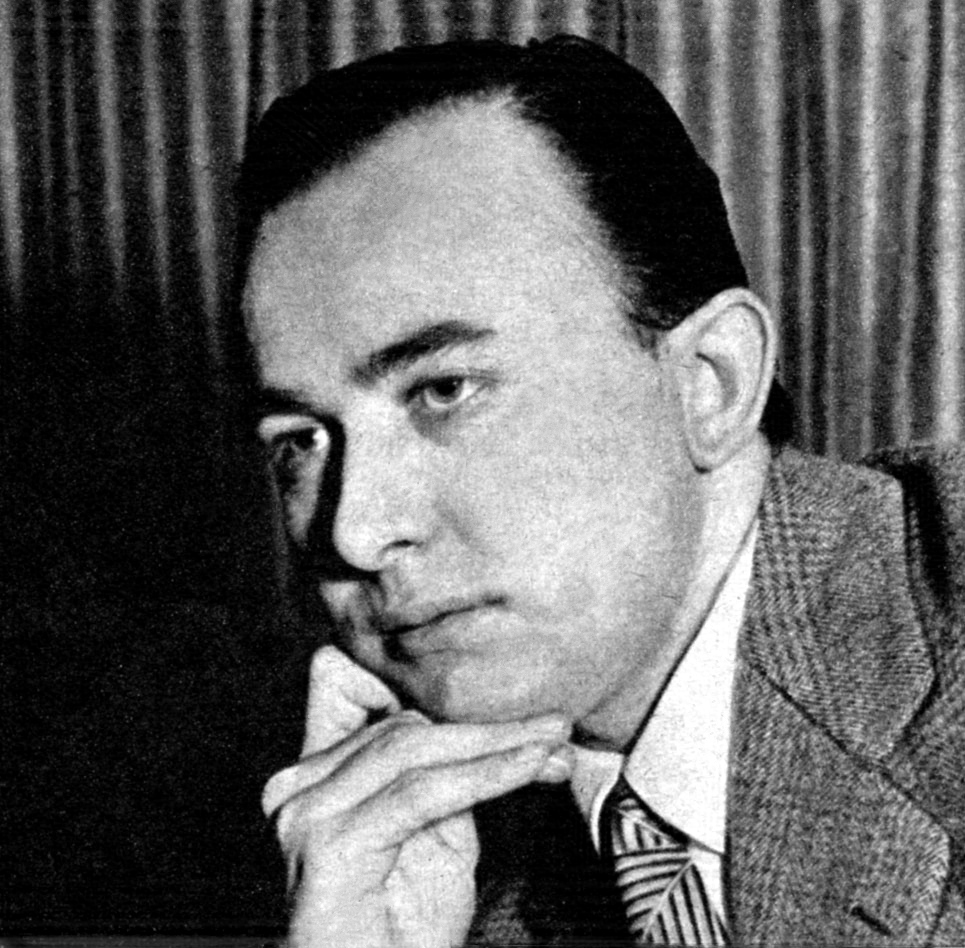
Giuseppe Campora.

Giuseppe Campora (September 30, 1923 – December 4, 2004) was an Italian operatic tenor.

== Early life ==
Giuseppe Campora was born on September 30, 1923, in Tortona, Italy.

== Career ==
Giuseppe Campora in Tosca, teatro comunale di Bologna (photo with dedication)

Campora was a Puccinian tenor. In 1954 he was the dubbed voice for Nicolai Filacuridi as Pinkerton in the Carmine Gallone directed film of Madama Butterfly. Campora enjoyed successes in all the major theatres of Italy (including Maurizio in Adriana Lecouvreur with Magda Olivero at the Teatro alla Scala, 1958), as well as at the Metropolitan Opera in New York City, where his performances of the 1950s and 1960s are still fondly remembered. He was the Edgardo in Lucia di Lammermoor, in Maria Callas's only Met broadcast, in 1956. In 1973, he debuted at the New York City Opera as the Chevalier des Grieux, in Manon. In 1980, he was heard at the San Diego Opera in Die Fledermaus, opposite Dame Joan Sutherland and Beverly Sills, in their only joint appearance. He also frequently sang the music of fellow Tortonese Lorenzo Perosi.

His discography includes recordings of La forza del destino (1952), La Gioconda (1952), Madama Butterfly (with Renata Tebaldi, 1952), Simon Boccanegra (with Victoria de los Ángeles, Tito Gobbi and Boris Christoff, 1957), Tosca (with Tebaldi and Enzo Mascherini, 1952) and La traviata (1952), Beatrice de Tenda (with Sutherland, Kabaivanska, Dondi, Votto & La Scala, 1961). Disc of arias for Decca, (1954).

== Death ==
Campora died on December 4, 2004, in Tortona, Piedmont, Italy.
