= Nicola Filacuridi =

Italian opera singer

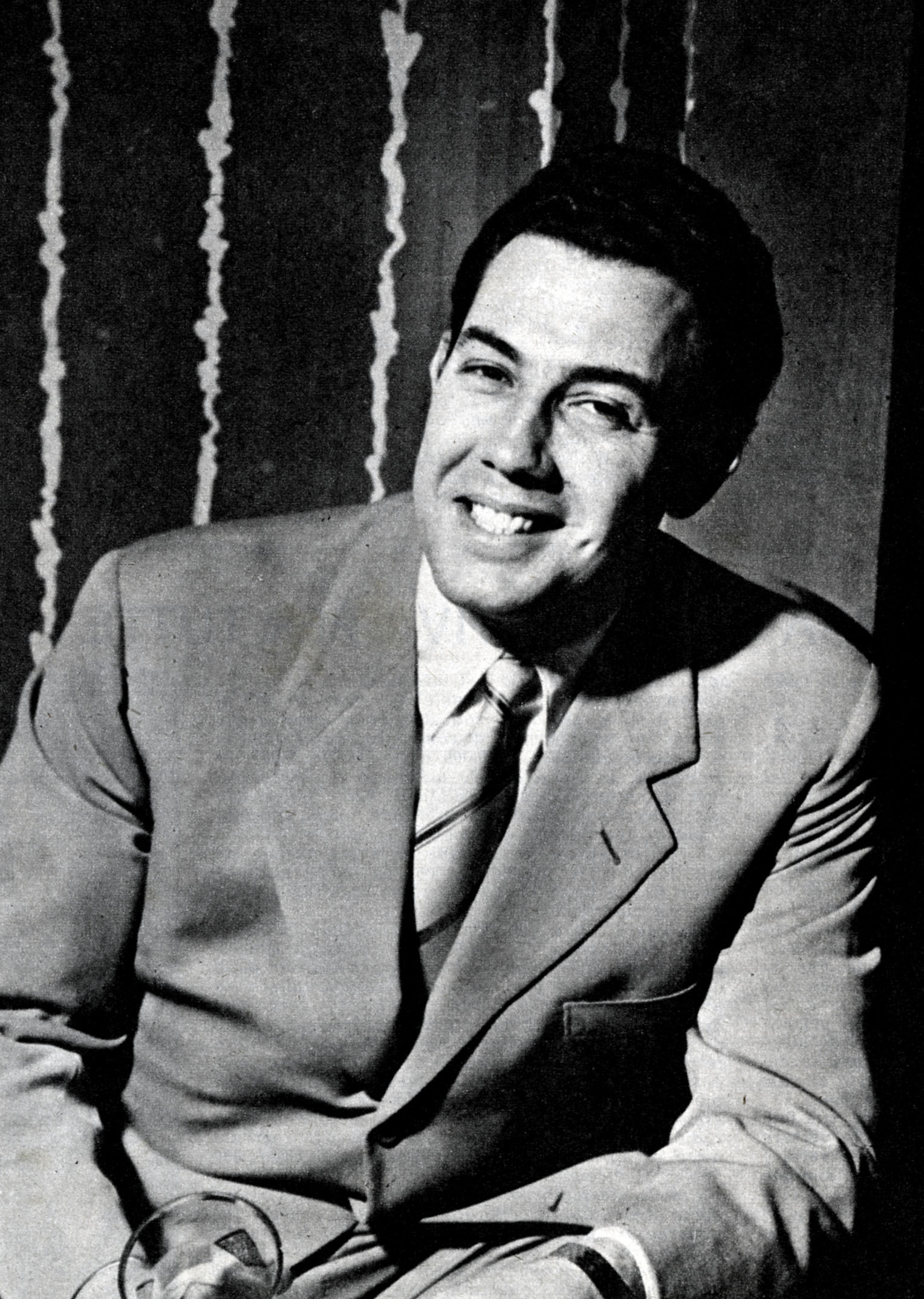
Nicola Filacuridi

Nicola Filacuridi (Greek: Νικόλαος Φυλακουρίδης, Nikólaos Phylakourídēs) (Alexandria 1 June 1920 – Sydney 12 February 2009) was an Egyptian-born operatic tenor of Greek origin, who had an illustrious career in Italy in the 1950s.

Filacuridi was born in Alexandria, Egypt into a family of Greek origin. He first studied in his native city with Ettore Cordone and made his debut at the Cairo Opera in 1945, as Turiddu in Cavalleria rusticana. Shortly after this, he left for Italy to continue his studies with Federico Del Cupolo.

He made his Italian stage debut in Savona, as Alfredo, in 1949. The following year, he appeared at the Rome Opera as Maurizio in Adriana Lecouvreur. He then sang at all the major opera houses of Italy, Trieste, Venice, Parma, Turin, Florence, Naples, etc. He made his La Scala debut in 1953, in a contemporary work Leonore 40/45 by Rolf Liebermann, and took part in the premiere of the Dialogues of the Carmelites in 1957. He also sang in Paul Hindemith's Mathis der Maler in 1958. Throughout the 1950s he was very active singing on Italian radio and television (RAI) appearing notably in productions of Lucia di Lammermoor, opposite Anna Moffo, La traviata, opposite Rosanna Carteri and Carlo Tagliabue, Adriana Lecouvreur, opposite Marcella Pobbé and Fedora Barbieri, and Un ballo in maschera, again with Pobbé.

In 1954 he starred in the role of Pinkerton in the film adaptation of Madama Butterfly directed by Carmine Gallone and shot on location in Italy. According to the information regarding this film version, although Filacurudi acted the role of Pinkerton, it was actually sung by another Italian tenor, Giuseppe Campora.

He also began making guest appearances outside Italy, notably at the Monte Carlo Opera, at La Monnaie in Brussels, the Vienna State Opera, the Royal Opera House in London, and the festivals of Aix-en-Provence and Glyndebourne. He also appeared in Spain, Portugal, Argentina, Brazil, the Dallas Opera opposite Maria Callas and the Sydney Opera House.

In 1964 Filacuridi decided to retire from the stage and move with his family in Australia. His last appearances on that year were at a production of Carmen of the Elizabethan Theatre Trust Opera Company and later in New Zealand where he interpreted again the character of Pinkerton in Madama Butterfly.

After quitting the stage, Filacuridi embarked in a new career as a real estate agent in Australia.

Filacuridi sang a wide range of roles in operas such as; Rigoletto, Un ballo in maschera, La bohème, Tosca, Les contes d'Hoffmann, Louise, Werther, Idomeneo, and Lohengrin. He also created roles in contemporary works such as Il cappello di paglia di Firenze by Nino Rota and La Guerra by Renzo Rossellini. He sang some 65 roles throughout his career.

== Sources ==
- Operissimo.com directory entry in German
