= Teatro Paganini =

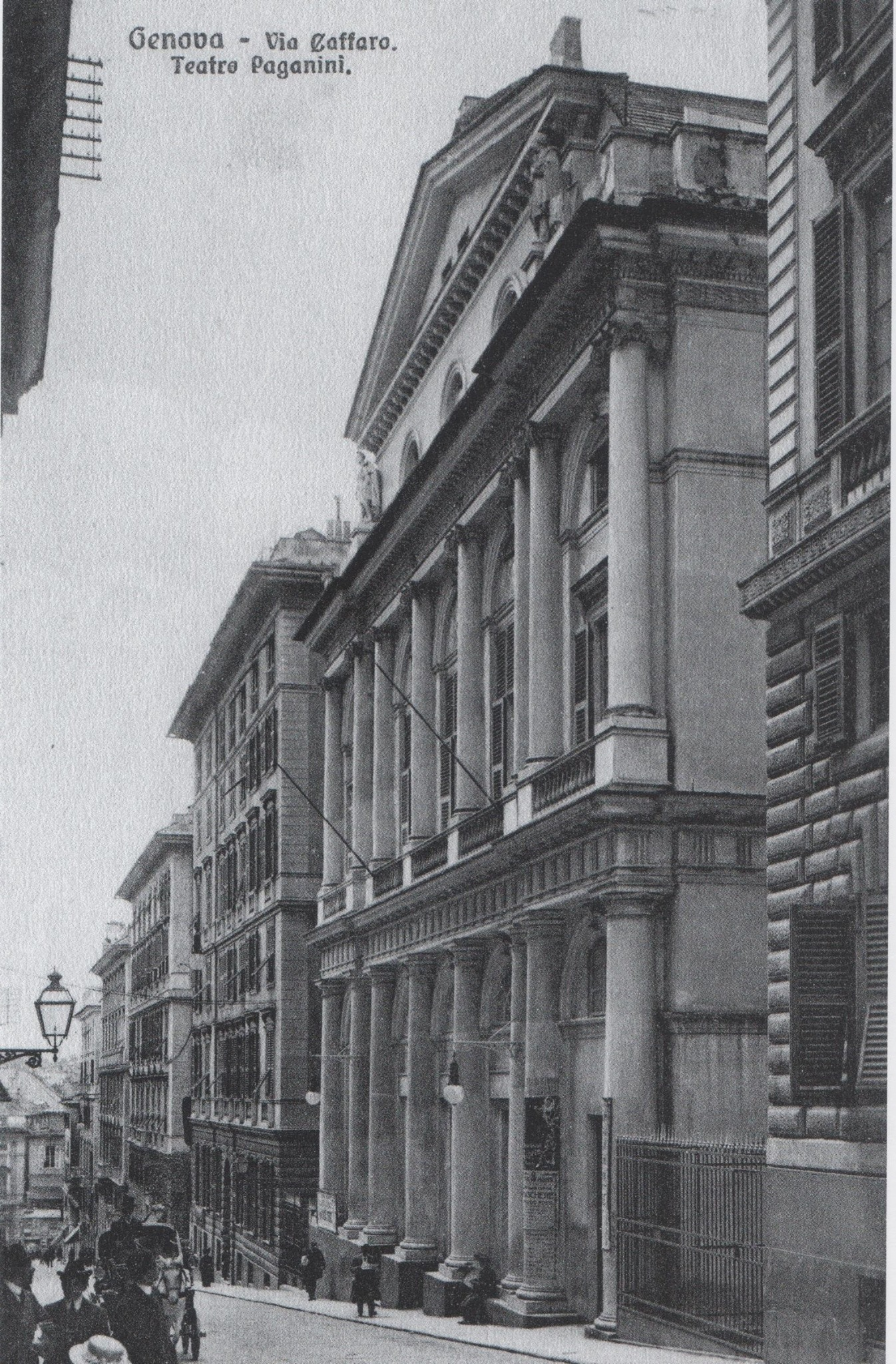
- Interactive map of the Teatro Paganini area

General information
- Location: Via Caffaro 10, Genova, Italy
- Construction started: 28 June 1853
- Completed: 8 April 1855
- Inaugurated: 9 April 1855
- Destroyed: 23-24 October 1942

Design and construction
- Architect: Tommaso Carpineti

Other information
- Seating type: Palchi (boxes), Loggione
- Seating capacity: 2500

The Paganini Theater was an Italian theater, located in Genova. Inaugurated in 1855, it was situated on the central Via Caffaro. After less than a century of activity, on 23-24 October 1942, it was destroyed during the bombardments on Genova in World War II.

== History ==
=== Premises and the cultural context ===
During the golden age of Italian drama, even before the unification of Italy, the growing Genoese upper-middle class demanded the construction of new theaters to serve the city's entertainment needs. Theater managers, sometimes dealing only with entrepreneurial aspects and sometimes also with cultural organization, met this demand.

Although significant national theaters were already present in the capital city (such as the Teatro Carlo Felice, the Teatro Colombo, the Teatro del Falcone, the Teatro di Sant'Agostino, the Teatro Apollo, and others), the demand was particularly intense and was seized upon by Francesco Sanguinetti (or Sanguineti), already the manager of the Teatro Carlo Felice. The construction of the new theater was chosen for the area of Via Caffaro, an important artery that connected the city center uphill with the upscale neighborhood of Castelletto, recently developed through the projects of Carlo Barabino and Giovanni Battista Resasco.

=== Opening of the theater and the start of dramaturgical activities ===
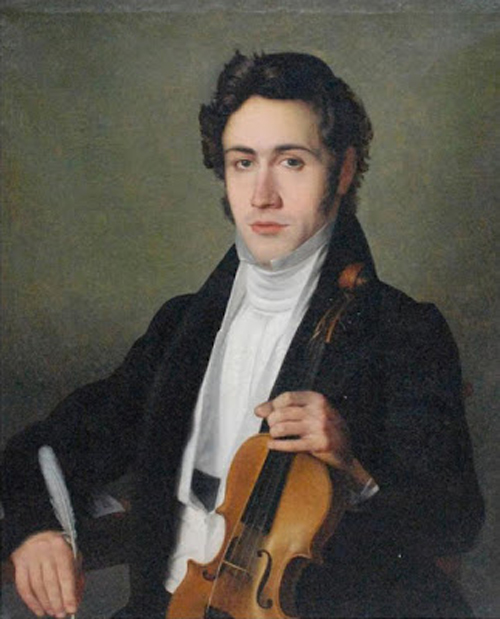
Painting of a young Niccolò Paganini, to whom the theater was dedicated

Inaugurated on 9 April 1855, Paganini Theater was designed by Tommaso Carpineti. Although sometimes attributed to G. B. Carpaneto, the oldest sources agree on Tommaso Carpineti as the architect (despite another G.B. Carpineti being listed in the contemporary registry as well). The theater construction plans are preserved in the State Archive of Genova. Sanguinetti decided to name it after the renowned Genoese violinist Niccolò Paganini.

The building was located in front of the Collegio-Convitto Commerciale d'Ippolito d'Aste, at the intersection with Via Bruzza. The inauguration took place with a performance of Rigoletto. The Annuario dei teatri di Genova from 1845/1855 summarized the steps that led to the birth of the theater:

In the new street between the destroyed gates of Portello and the hill of St. Anna, not far from the famous Contrada Nuova, in 1853, according to a plan devised by Engineer Tommaso Carpineti, the construction of a new theater was approved. On 28 June that year, the foundation stone of the theater was laid, and within a mere twenty months, it was completed. Meanwhile, the Civic Council, in its resolution on 1 February, assigned the name Via Cafaro to the new street. [...] Adorned by its owners with the name of the great Ligurian artist Niccolò Paganini, the theater was inaugurated on the evening of 9 April of the current year, under the management of the astute impresario Francesco Sanguineti. He spared no effort in forming a triple and numerous Company of Singing and Dancing Artists of proven merit, capable of performing grand spectacles, the list of which follows. [...] Rigoletto, Il Trovatore, I due Foscari, Fiorina, Una burla per correzione, I due sergenti

— Yearbook of the Theaters of Genoa from 1845 to 1855

The building was of great elegance and sumptuousness: externally adorned with columns, and internally rich in stuccos, gildings, friezes, and draperies. During its construction, it received praise from the specialized press, which in December 1854 wrote, "the new theater, if not for its vastness, at least for its elegance, surpasses that of Carlo Felice". In 1873, it was described as "an extremely elegant theater", and compared in importance with the Teatro Manzoni in Milan and the Carignano in Turin. On several occasions, to generate higher profits from more popular works, performances or concerts of greater importance than those of Carlo Felice were staged due to the organization of the ownership of the boxes.

=== Theatrical season lineup ===
The performances at the Paganini covered the entire year and varied according to the seasons:

- Carnival: Italian comedy.
- Quaresima: comedy with a primary company.
- Spring: French comedy.
- Autumn: opera, with or without ballet.

During the carnival balls, with a particular mechanism of gears, the stalls could be raised, forming a single hall with the stage.

=== Giuseppe Garibaldi at the Teatro Colombo ===
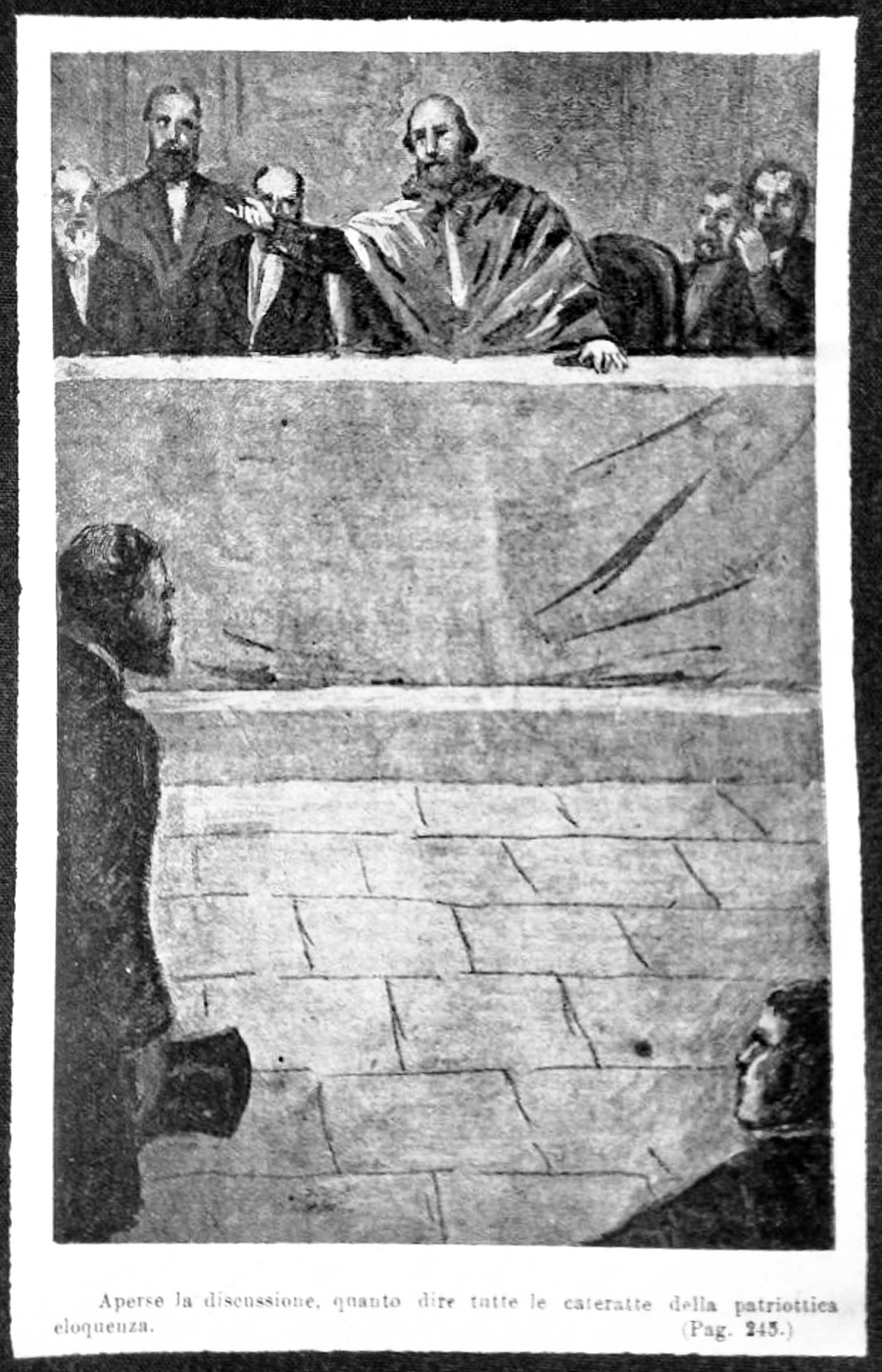
Giuseppe Garibaldi at Paganini Theater during the first assembly of the Association of Provisional Committees, on 9 March 1862

The theater also had significance in the fate of Italy as a nation, since the first assembly of the Association of Provisional Committees, chaired by Giuseppe Garibaldi, took place here on 9 March 1862, with about 400 attendees present.

At that time, Italy had become a unified state less than a year prior, with Victor Emmanuel II as its King. However, the new Kingdom still did not include Venice or Rome, a situation that was a source of tension in internal politics. The assembly took place shortly after the resignation of Camillo Benso, Count of Cavour's successor, Ricasoli. During the meeting at the Paganini Theater, Garibaldi pointed again to Venice and Rome, and the assembly ended with the establishment of the Emancipatory Society of which Garibaldi was appointed president.

=== The successes of the late nineteenth century ===
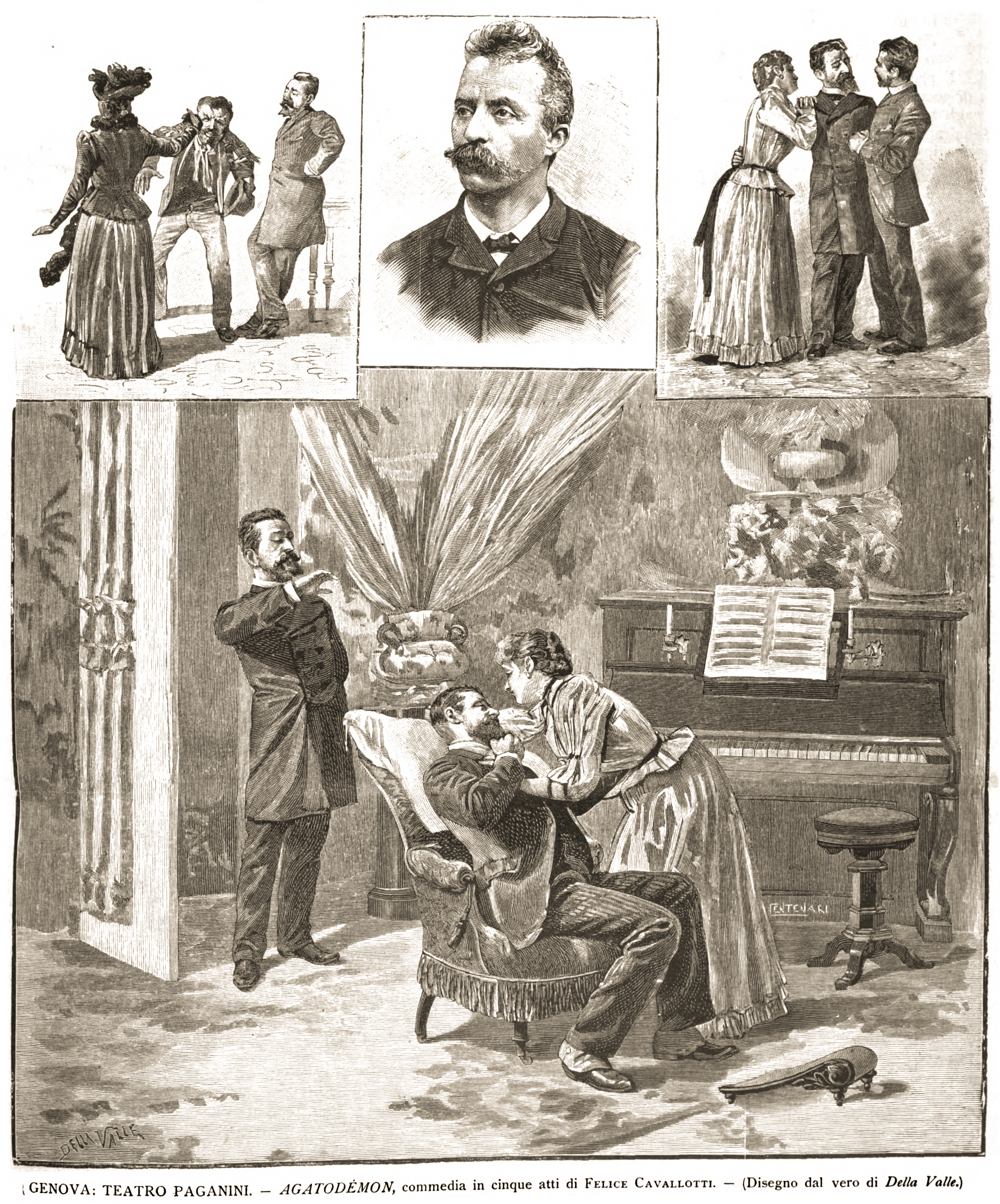
A drawing by Alberto Della Valle during the performance of Agatodémon by Felice Cavallotti at Paganini Theater, in February 1890

In 1874, the theater hosted the first staging of the opera Non c'è rosa senza spine by Ippolito Tito D'Aste, by the Sadowksy company directed by Knight Luigi Monti, on 18 April 1874.

In December 1877, the violinist Camillo Sivori, a student and friend of Paganini, staged a highly successful concert accompanied by pianist Rafael Joseffy. The following evening, the renowned soprano Adelina Patti, along with Ernesto Nicolini, performed La Traviata. The success was remarkable, so much so that the correspondent of the Gazzetta musicale di Milano enthusiastically reviewed the city's response to the event:

It was enthusiasm, fanaticism, delirium, which no one would have expected, and which not only remained within the narrow circle of the theater but spread outside; so that when Patti left the theater, an enthusiastic crowd greeted her appearance and followed the carriage to the Isotta hotel. Not ceasing to applaud and acclaim the eminent artist, she had to appear on the balcony to thank the numerous crowd that thronged in Via Roma.

— Gazzetta Musicale di Milano, 1877

On 26 November 1881 the first Genoese performance of Carmen by Georges Bizet took place at the Paganini, starring Célestine Galli-Marié and directed by Emilio Usiglio, with philosopher Friedrich Nietzsche present in the audience to witness it for the first time.

=== A brief decline, the arrival of cinema, and the revival ===
After some financial problems, common to most theaters between the 19th and 20th centuries, which did not stop its activity, the theater regained its momentum at the beginning of the new century.

In the 1920 season, performances included Il Barbiere di Siviglia with Ena Surinach, Romano Ciaroff, and Carlo Cavallini; Mignon by Ambroise Thomas; Cavalleria rusticana with Tina Poli-Randaccio and Socrate Caceffo; and Pagliacci with Nedda Gina Viganò and Aureliano Pertile conducted by Federico Del Cupolo. In 1926, Ermete Zacconi held three consecutive performances there.

=== The Allied bombing and complete destruction ===
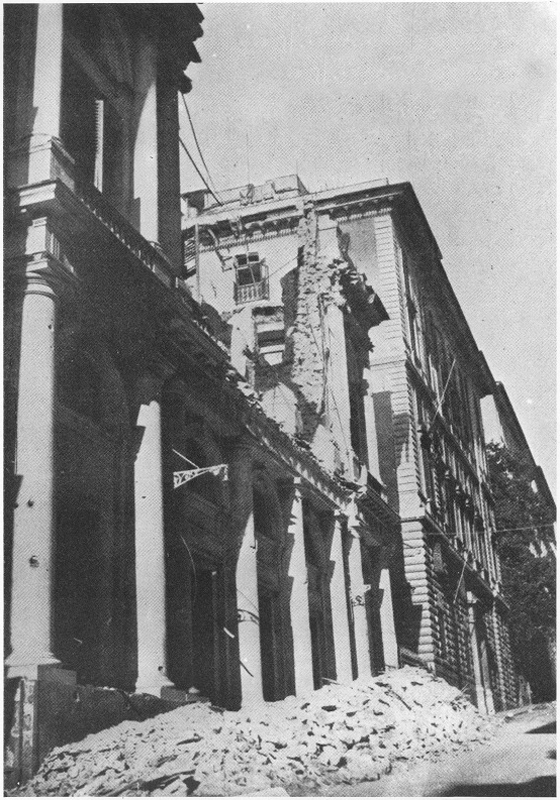
The remains of the theater after the 1942 Allied bombings that destroyed the building and the historical archives

During one of the dozen Allied bombings on Genoa on 23-24 October 1942, the building was almost completely destroyed, along with the historical archive kept in the premises, as reported by the superintendent on 25 October 1942.

After the war, it was not rebuilt, and in the same space, with civic number 12, a modern-rationalist style building was later constructed for residential use.

== Description ==
The hall was horseshoe-shaped, finely furnished, and had 5 orders of boxes and the gods; each order had 29 boxes. The stage curtain was the work of painter Giuseppe Isola and depicted Il trionfo del Petrarca in Campidoglio (The Triumph of Petrarch on the Capitol). The auditorium measured 17x18 meters with a height of 16 meters. The stage, 30x22 meters, had a height of 24 meters.

The lighting, innovative for the period, was gas-powered, with a sumptuous chandelier with 76 flames illuminating the auditorium.

Two marble staircases led to the boxes. On the second-order floor, there were three "gracefully painted" rooms for coffee and billiards. Another coffee room was located on the right corner of the theater, accessible both from the street in front and internally from the lobby for the public. On the fourth-order floor, there were additional three rooms where the first rehearsals of the works took place and were converted into a foyer for dance parties or as an outlet in case of excess spectators.

Above, there was an apartment intended as a residence for the manager, as well as other rooms for the caretaker's accommodation and offices. Going up more stairs, there was the dressing room for artists, the choir, the band, the choristers, and the extras. Finally, it was abundantly supplied with running water for cleaning, an uncommon feature at that time and therefore mentioned in the period descriptions.
