= Federico Del Cupolo =

Federico Del Cupolo (Naples, 1884-Milan, 1974) was an Italian orchestra conductor whose activity mainly focussed on Italian opera. His career developed in Italy and abroad spanning 60 years and including some recordings from the early 1950s which have been recently resumed for their historical and artistic significance.

== Discography ==
In 1929 in Philadelphia he recorded the ouverture of La gazza ladra by Rossini; in 1951 he recorded with the Orchestra of La Scala the operas L'arlesiana and Adriana Lecouvreur (according to the Italian Wikipedia article) by Francesco Cilea, the latter interpreted by Mafalda Favero, Elena Nicolai and Nicola Filacuridi.

In 1953, he recorded two operas by Puccini: La rondine with the Antonio Guarnieri Orchestra and Chorus of Milan, and Manon Lescaut, with the Turin RAI Orchestra.
