= Damery, Marne =

Damery
- Commune
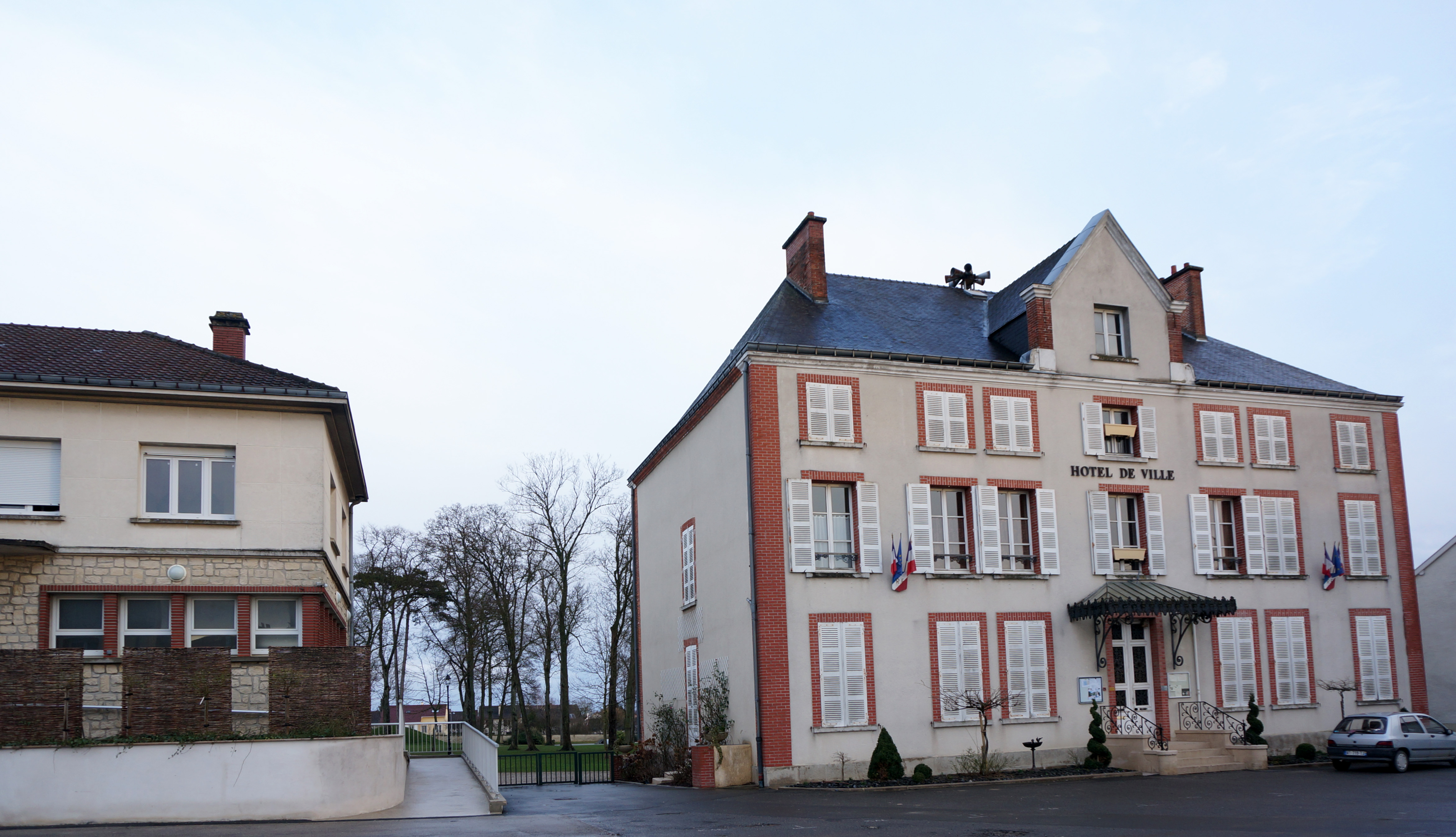
- The town hall in Damery

- Coat of arms
- Location of Damery
- Location within France Location within Grand Est
- Coordinates: 49°04′19″N 3°52′42″E
- Country: France
- Region: Grand Est
- Department: Marne
- Arrondissement: Épernay
- Canton: Dormans-Paysages de Champagne
- Intercommunality: Paysages de la Champagne

Government
  - Mayor (2020–2026): Sandrine Mignon
- Area^{1}: 15.44 km^{2} (5.96 sq mi)
- Elevation: 80 m (260 ft)
- Population (2023): 1,322
  - Density: 85.62/km^{2} (221.8/sq mi)
- Time zone: UTC+01:00 (CET)
  - Summer (DST): UTC+02:00 (CEST)
- INSEE/Postal code: 51204 /51480
- Website: www.damery51.fr
- ^{1} French Land Register data, which excludes lakes, ponds, glaciers > 1 km^{2} (0.386 sq mi or 247 acres) and river estuaries.

Damery is a commune in the Marne department in north-eastern France.

== See also ==
- Communes of the Marne department
- Montagne de Reims Regional Natural Park
