= Elferrat =

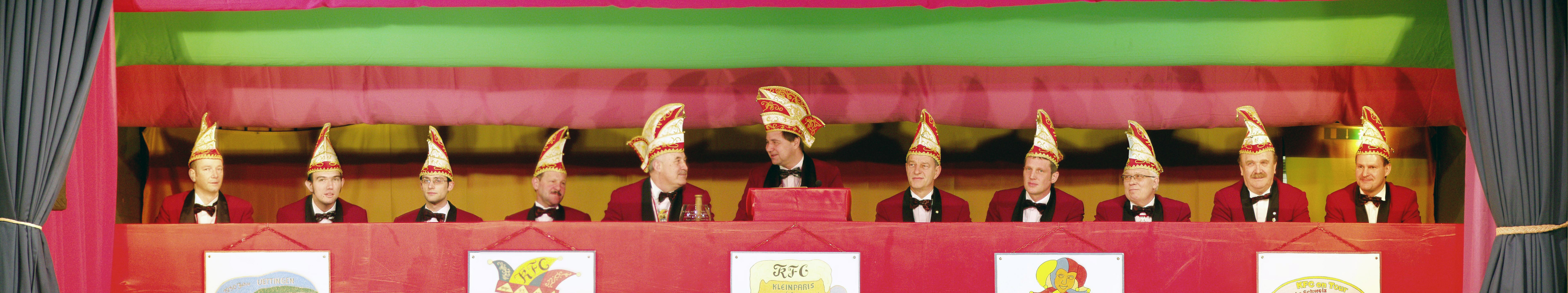
Although eleven Elferrat members appear on stage, the council is sometimes composed of more people.

The Elferrat (German for "council of eleven") is the council of a kingdom of fools in a carnival.

== Development ==
The Elferrat was originally introduced in the Rhine carnival reform in 1823 and has its roots in the region in Germany west of the Rhine, from France after the French Revolution. French became the language of trade, and French laws were in use. In connection with the revolution, this helped develop civil and political rights, with a level of freedom of speech and equality of citizens in front of the law. With Napoleon's defeat, this came to an end, and Absolutism was restored. In Mainz, the Austrians and the Prussians formed the military authority in conjunction. Cologne, the first free imperial city, came to be ruled by the Prussians.

== The eleven in the Elferrat ==
The citizens robbed of their rights came to view the number eleven as a symbol of the French Revolution, because it symbolised equality among the people, that is to say one beside one.

The German word elf (eleven) can be seen as an abbreviation "ELF" for the motto of the French Revolution: Egalité, Liberté, Fraternité - "equality, liberty, fraternity".

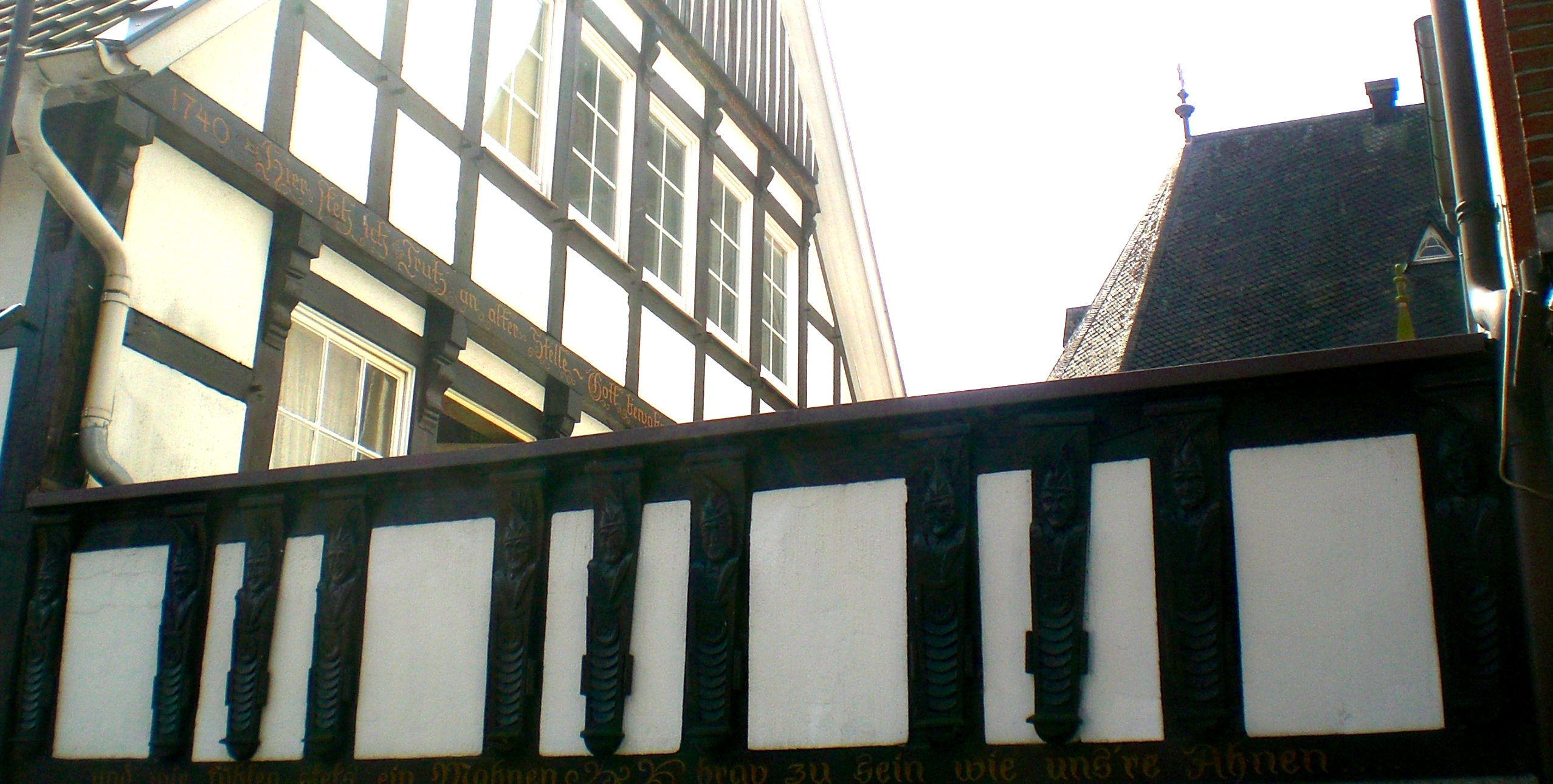
The Elferrat of a small carnival metropol in northern Germany, shown on the facade of a building.

This abbreviation was subsequently frequently used in the French Revolution and by Napoleon as a logo. It first became a motto in the start of the French Third Republic in 1871, and later explained as the main motto of the revolution in retrospect. During the revolution, it was only one three-word motto among many, such as "health, might, unity" and "might, equality, justice", which are nowadays found in historical documents much more seldom than the famous motto "equality, liberty, fraternity".

The Elferrat thus thought of themselves as a council of citizen peers, hidden under fool's hats.

== The Elferrat in modern carnivals ==
Although eleven male (in some places, also female) members of the Elferrat can be seen on stage in the official meeting in a carnival, it is mostly composed of a greater number of men. In some cities, there are special female councils, such as the Achterrat in Freiburg, because the traditionally male-dominated associations usually leave women only in the role of majorettes, not in these representative positions. In many associations, so-called honorary Elferrats are nominated, mostly consisting of distinguished association members or supporters such as politicians, businessmen and so on.

=== Duties ===
The Elferrat plans and organises various details of the carnival in its sessions, such as dances, carnival meetings and the move routes of the carnival. The Elferrat and their wives also participate in various festivities outside these sessions.
