= Ihre Hoheit, die Tänzerin (operetta) =

Ihre Hoheit, die Tänzerin (Her Highness, the Dancer) is an operetta in three acts by Walter Goetze to a libretto by Richard Bars and Oskar Felix. It premiered on 9 May 1919 at the Bellevue Theatre in Stettin.

== Roles ==
- Duchess of Tyllberg (soprano)
- Baroness Helma, her friend (soubrette)
- Baron von Stein, Majordomo to the Duchess
- Bolko von Wellhofen, his nephew (buffo)
- Hans von Mayburg, Esquire (tenor)
- Cimboletto, director of a ballet company
- Anita, maid to the Duchess
- Baumann, valet to Baron von Stein
- Franz, servant to Mayburg
- Court society, officers, huntsmen, dancers

== Synopsis ==
Setting: Late Rococo or timeless

=== Act 1 ===
The park of the hunting palace of the Duchess

Hans, a romantic lad, suffers from the refusal by the Spanish dancer Marietta to marry him. He is introduced to the Duchess who is taken by his charm, but she soon learns that Hans' affection is based on her resemblance to Marietta. When Cimboletto suggests a performance of his troupe, she plans to appear in that performance disguised as Marietta to discover what Hans' real feelings are.

The adventurous Bolko meets Helma who pretends to be the Duchess' maid.

=== Act 2 ===
A large tent near the palace

The Duchess' performance as Marietta is a great success; the whole court and the officers gush about her. Hans' feelings are confused, but intoxicated by the last embrace and parting kiss of who he believes to be Marietta, he confesses to her that his true feelings are for the Duchess.

Much to Helma's dismay, Bolko spends much of the evening with the pretty girls from the ballet.

=== Act 3 ===
The boudoir of the Duchess

Helma still pretends to the Duchess' maid, and Bolko fears that the Duchess might disapprove of his marriage to a commoner. To his great delight, Helma's true identity is finally revealed, and the Duchess gifts him a country estate and von Stein as its steward.

The Duchess makes Hans a Lieutenant of her guard and reveals the secret of her disguise during the previous evening.

==== Notable arias ====
- Das Lied vom schwachen Stündchen/Im Rausch des Glücks
- Dich hat Frau Venus geboren (duet)
