= Edoardo Vera =

Italian opera composer

Edoardo Vera (1821–1889) was an Italian opera composer.

== Works ==
=== Operas ===
- Anelda da Messina
- Valeria: lyric tragedy in four acts to a libretto by Antonio Ghislanzoni – 1869
- Adriana Lecouvreur e la duchessa di Bouillon: (on the same subject as Adriana Lecouvreur) lyric drama in 4 acts to a libretto by Achille de Lauzières – 1856

=== Songs ===
- "L'ombre"
- "La tradita"
- "Mescetimi il vin"
