= Walter Goetze =

German composer (1883–1961)

Walter Wilhelm Goetze [sometimes Götze] (17 April 1883 in Berlin – 24 March 1961 in Berlin) was a German composer of operettas and revues.

Goetze began as composer of songs; the first of his many works for the stage was the revue Nur nicht drängeln (Don't Rush) in 1912, followed by his first operetta Der liebe Pepi (The Charming Pepi) in 1913. His most successful works in this form were Ihre Hoheit, die Tänzerin (1919) which achieved almost 700 performances in Berlin alone, Adrienne (1926) and Der goldene Pierrot (1934).

Other successful numbers from his other works include "Was wär' mein Lied, könnt' ich's dir nicht singen" ("What would my song be if I couldn't sing it to you") from Der Page des Königs (The King's Page) (1933) and "Das Branntweinlied" ("The Brandy Song") from Adrienne (1926).

== Works ==
- 1911: Parkettsitz Nr. 10, Posse mit Musik, prologue and three acts (libretto: Herman Haller and Willi Wolff)
- 1912: Nur nicht drängeln, Posse mit Musik, three acts (libretto: Richard Nessler and Willy Prager)
- 1914: Der liebe Pepi, operetta, three acts (libretto: Bruno Decker and Otto Sprinzel)
- 1918: Am Brunnen vor dem Tore, Singspiel, three acts (libretto: Oskar Felix)
- 1919: Ihre Hoheit, die Tänzerin, operetta, three acts (libretto: Richard Bars and Oskar Felix)
- 1920: Die Spitzenkönigin, operetta, three acts (libretto: Richard Bars and Oskar Felix)
- 1926: Adrienne, operetta, three acts (libretto: originally by Günther Bibo and Alexander Pordes-Milo; 1936 reworked by Oskar Felix.)
- 1934: Der goldene Pierrot, operetta, eight scenes (libretto: Oskar Felix and Otto Kleinert)
- 1935: Schach dem König, operetta
- 1950: Liebe im Dreiklang , operetta (libretto: Emil F. Malkowsky and Walter W. Goetze)
