= Ernest Legouvé =

French dramatist

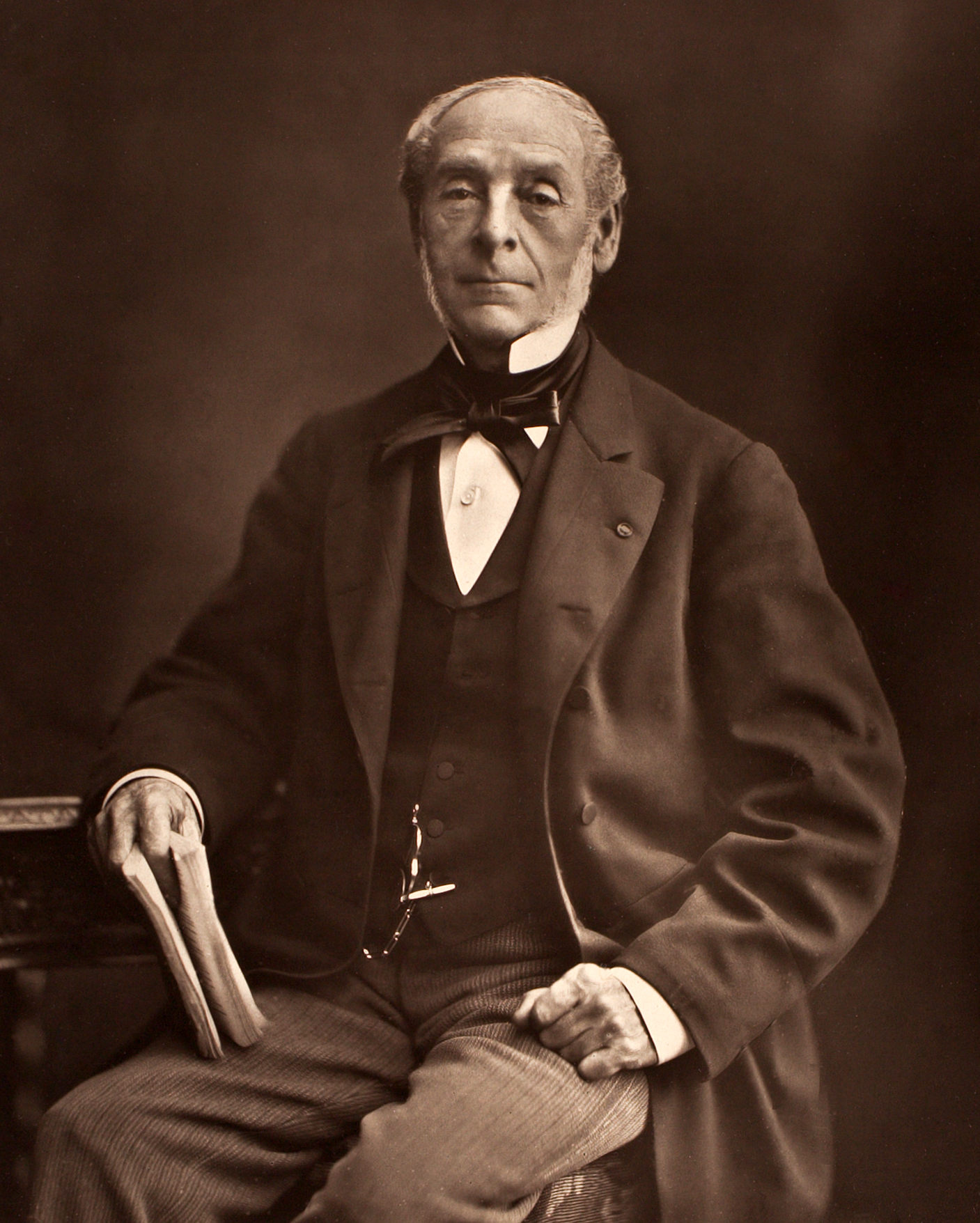
Ernest Legouvé circa 1875.

Gabriel Jean Baptiste Ernest Wilfrid Legouvé (pronounced [ɡabʁijɛl ʒɑ̃ batist ɛʁnɛst wilfʁid ləɡuve]; 14 February 1807 – 14 March 1903) was a French dramatist.

== Biography ==
Son of the poet Gabriel-Marie Legouvé (1764–1812), he was born in Paris. His mother died in 1810, and almost immediately afterwards his father was removed to a lunatic asylum. The child, however, inherited a considerable fortune, and was carefully educated. Jean Nicolas Bouilly (1763–1842) was his tutor, and instilled in the young Legouvé a passion for literature, to which the example of his father and of his grandfather, Jean-Baptiste Legouvé (1729–1783), predisposed him.

As early as 1829 he carried away a prize of the Académie française for a poem on the discovery of printing; and in 1832 he published a curious little volume of verses, entitled Les Morts Bizarres. In those early days Legouvé brought out a succession of novels, of which Édith de Falsen enjoyed a considerable success. In 1847 he began the work by which he is best remembered, his contributions to the development and education of the female mind, by lecturing at the College of France on the moral history of women; these discourses were collected into a volume in 1848, and enjoyed a great success.

Legouvé wrote considerably for the stage, and in 1849 he collaborated with A. E. Scribe in Adrienne Lecouvreur. In 1855 he brought out his tragedy of Médée, the success of which had much to do with his election to the Académie française. He succeeded to the fauteuil of J. A. Ancelot, and was received by Flourens, who dwelt on the plays of Legouvé as his principal claim to consideration.

As time passed on, however, he became less prominent as a playwright, and more so as a lecturer and propagandist on women's rights and the advanced education of children, in both of which directions he was a pioneer in French society. His La Femme en France au XIX^{e} siècle (1864), reissued, much enlarged, in 1878; his Messieurs les enfants (1868), his Conférences Parisiennes (1872), his Nos filles et nos fils (1877), and his Une Éducation de jeune fille (1884) were works of wide-reaching influence in the moral order.

In 1886–1887 he published, in two volumes, his Soixante ans de souvenirs, an excellent specimen of autobiography. He was raised in 1887 to the highest grade of the Legion of Honor, and held for many years the post of inspector-general of female education in the national schools. Legouvé was always an advocate of physical training. He was long accounted one of the best shots in France, and although, from a conscientious objection, he never fought a duel, he made the art of fencing his lifelong hobby. After the death of Désiré Nisard in 1888, Legouvé became the "father" of the Académie française. He died in Paris in 1903.

== Works ==
- Adrienne Lecouvreur (1849)
- Soixante ans de souvenirs (1886–1887), translated as Sixty Years of Recollections (1893) by Albert D. Vandam
