= Francesco Repetto =

Italian priest and librarian

- Father Francesco Repetto, 1943
- Born: 1914; Genoa, Italy
- Died: 1984 (aged 69–70); Genoa, Italy
- Occupation: Catholic Priest

Monsignor Francesco Repetto (Genoa, 1914–1984) was an Italian priest and librarian. He is honoured by Jews as a Righteous Among the Nations for his leading role in the clandestine DELASEM organization, which contributed to the saving of thousands of Jews during the Holocaust in Italy during the German occupation.

== Biography ==
As a young man, he studied at Gregorian University. While in Rome he met and became friends with Monsignor Giovanni Battista Montini (the future Pope Paul VI). He was ordained into the priesthood in 1938 and two years later, was appointed secretary to the Archbishop of Genoa Pietro Boetto. Genoa in the meantime was chosen as the headquarters of DELASEM, a legal Jewish organization chaired by the lawyer Avvocato Lelio Vittorio Valobra, dedicated to providing assistance to the growing number of Jewish refugees in Italy.

From 8 September 1943 onwards, after the German occupation of Italy, Jews and foreigners in the territories of the Italian Social Republic were systematically deported. Before Valobra was expelled to Switzerland, he turned to Cardinal Boetto with the request to merge the activities of DELASEM, which had been forced to go underground, with those of the Genoa Curia, Repetto was directed to distribute the financial aid Massimo Teglio, known as The Scarlet Pimpernel (primula rossa) to the Jews of Genoa. Teglio re-organized DELASEM as a clandestine organization and produced false identity cards in private homes and hideouts in religious houses, while Father Repetto served as treasurer for the collection and distribution of the money that came from Switzerland through the American Jewish Joint Distribution Committee.

In 1944, Archbishop Filippo Bernardini, Apostolic Nuncio in Bern, was instrumental in maintaining the lines of communication between Valobra (settled in Zurich) and Father Repetto, who was still in Genoa. At the Genoa Curia, many letters arrived from Jews in the Vatican seeking news of their relatives and acquaintances in northern Italy.

Father Repetto found support in the Jewish and Catholic religious authorities, in particular the rabbis Riccardo Reuven Pacifici in Genoa and Nathan Cassuto in Florence (until their deportation with a big part of their families: Rav Riccardo Pacifici was deported with his wife Wanda Abenaim, his uncle Rav Samuele Avraham Pacifici, vice-rabbi, and his wife, Emma Polacco and daughter, Elena. The buried remains of Elena Pacifici have been recently discovered in the little Catholic cemetery of Swierklany Dolne, not far from Auschwitz, thanks to the investigations of an Israeli-Polish Shoah- researcher, Yaki Gantz. Rav Nathan Cassuto was deported with his wife Anna Di Gioacchino, who managed to save herself from deportation, only to die tragically at war's end in Palestine after making aliyah. So too were the bishops Pietro Boetto in Genoa, Elia Dalla Costa of Florence, Giuseppe Placido Nicolini of Assisi, Maurilio Fossati of Turin, Alfredo Ildefonso Schuster of Milan, and Antonio Torrini of Lucca.

To manage the difficult task of distributing funds, Father Repetto benefitted from the cooperation of some willing "money couriers", such as Jewish couriers Raffaele Cantoni, Giorgio Nissim or Salvatore Jona. A large group of priests also acted in this capacity, among them Father Giovanni De Micheli; Father Alessandro Piazza (who at the time was Bishop of Albenga); Father Gian Maria Rotondi; Father Carlo Salvi; Father Natale Traverso; Father Raffaele Storace, and Father Giuseppe Viola. These priests were sent on missions to various episcopal curiae, in Tuscany, Umbria, Marche, Piedmont, Valle d'Aosta, Lombardy and Veneto, in visits carefully planned by Father Repetto.

The links of solidarity that radiated out from Genoa to various localities allowed for an almost regular arrival of funds essential to the survival of thousands of Jews in central and northern Italy during the German occupation. Father Repetto developed many contacts with Father Giuseppe Bicchierai in Milan who was also secretary to the Cardinal. Schuster was a valuable contact as he was chaplain at Milan's prison of San Vittore. In Turin, contacts were with Monsignor Vincenzo Barale, secretary of the Cardinal. In Florence, Cardinal Dalla Costa delegated his secretary, Monsignor Giacomo Meneghello and the Rector of the Seminary, Monsignor Enrico Bartoletti, along with Father Leto Casini, Father Cipriano Ricotti, Father Giulio Facibeni, Giorgio La Pira and Adone Zoli as contacts.

The list of local contacts is extensive, including Father Raimondo Viale in Borgo San Dalmazzo, Father Bruno Beccari and Giuseppe Moreali in Nonantola, Giorgio Nissim and Father Arturo Paoli in Lucca, Mario Finzi in Bologna, fathers Aldo Brunacci and Rufino Nicacci in Assisi, Father Maria Benedetto, Angelo De Fiore, Settimo Sorani, and Sorani's assistant Giuseppe Levi in Rome. Among the best-known couriers in the project was cyclist and eventual Tour de France champion Gino Bartali. Repetto—who has long been the Prefect of the Biblioteca Franzoniana—decided to take refuge in the mountains to avoid being captured and tried for his actions, finding safe haven in Val Bisogno in Molassana in July 1944.

== Acknowledgements ==
In 1955, he was awarded a gold medal by the Union of Italian Jewish Communities; the justification states:

Father Francesco Repetto, secretary of the Archbishop of Genoa, after 8 September 1943, assumed the arduous and difficult task of continuing the underground work to assist Jews through DELASEM during the Nazi occupation. In this his most noble work, defied their (the Nazis) numerous complaints, threats and arrest orders which he fortunately evaded successfully, and created a real organization for the distribution of food supplies, shelters for emigration, hospitalization, and succeeded to help persecuted hundreds.

On 29 April 1976, Father Repetto then received the honour of Righteous Among the Nations from the Institute Yad Vashem in Jerusalem.
