= Matilde Cassin Vardi =

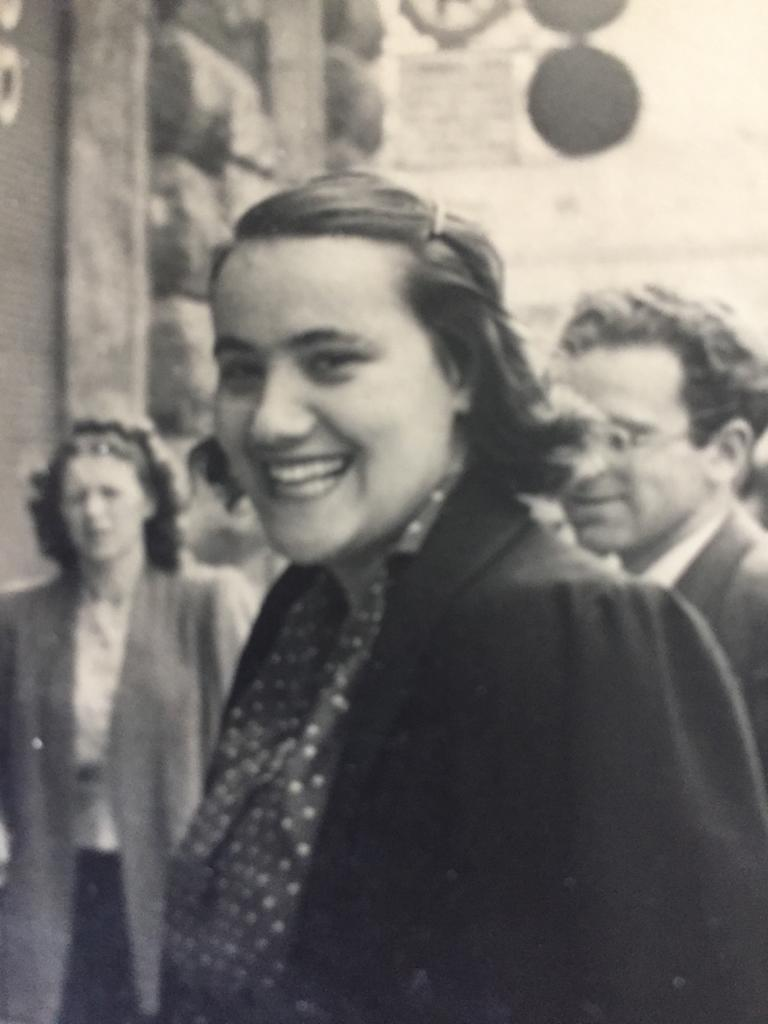
Matilde Cassin

Matilde (Rachel) Cassin Vardi (August 8, 1921 – May 24, 2006) worked extensively to save Jewish refugees who fled the horrors of World War II and sought refuge in Florence. When the Germans entered Florence on August 8, 1943, she operated within a Jewish-Christian underground that helped hide Jews in monasteries and religious institutions in the area. Many hiding places were discovered by the SS and their fascist collaborators, and their inhabitants were sent to extermination camps in Germany, but many were also saved. An unofficial estimate suggests that about 200-300 people were saved thanks to this activity. On November 26, 2019, Matilde received the "Jewish Rescuer Award" from the B'nai B'rith World Organization at a ceremony held in Jerusalem.

== Childhood in Florence ==
Matilde was born in Florence to a bourgeois Jewish family. Her father was a clerk at a well-known insurance company, and her mother was a housewife. In her youth, she participated in Campeggi, summer camps organized by Zionist activists to prepare young jews for immigration to the Land of Israel. There, she was first exposed to the Zionism, the Hebrew language, and Jewish culture. Matilde attended the prestigious Galileo High School.

== The Beginning of the racial laws in Italy ==
On November 17, 1938, Italy enacted the Racial Laws. As a result, Jewish students and teachers were expelled from educational institutions. To address this issue, the Jewish community established a private school within the synagogue complex. Matilde organized a group of children and conducted social activities with them in the afternoons. They learned Hebrew songs, Zionism, and Judaism and held social gatherings. When World War II broke out in Europe on September 1, 1939, Jewish refugees fleeing the horrors of war began arriving in Italy in search of asylum. To assist this wave of refugees, DELASEM (Delegazione per l'Assistenza degli Emigranti Ebrei) was founded. Its goal was to ensure the refugees' well-being. Matilde joined the organization as soon as it began operating in Florence.

She would go to the central train station to locate the newly arrived refugees—exhausted and frightened—and guide them to the offices of the Jewish community. Under the leadership of Rabbi Nathan Cassuto, the community arranged for refugees to be housed in abandoned public buildings and provided them with food, clothing, and medical care. At that time, the Fascist authorities largely turned a blind eye to these activities.

Matilde quickly recognized the unique distress of children, who often arrived alone, without their parents. Along with the Laskar sisters (who were later murdered) and others, she founded "DELASEM dei piccoli" (DELASEM for the Children) They kept records of all refugee children and their hiding places, sent them packages with books and sweets, and maintained regular contact with them.

During this period, Matilde also remained in touch with the children of Villa Emma, a group of Yugoslavian children led by Josko Indig (later known as Yosef Itai). DELASEM had settled them in a villa near the town of Nonantola in northern Italy. (Later, in a remarkable rescue operation, the townspeople helped smuggle all the children to Switzerland).

== The Jewish Underground in Florence ==
This activity continued until September 8, 1943, when the Germans entered the city. From that moment, everything changed. There was an urgent need to transition to clandestine operations and find hiding places for refugees whose lives were in immediate danger.

The idea was to seek help from Church authorities. A meeting was arranged between Matilde, Rabbi Nathan Cassuto and the head of the Catholic Church in Florence, Cardinal Elia Dalla Costa. Following this meeting, a joint Jewish-Christian underground was established, involving two priests—*Father Cipriano Ricotti and Don Leto Casini. Their mission was to locate monasteries in the Florence area willing to shelter Jewish refugees.

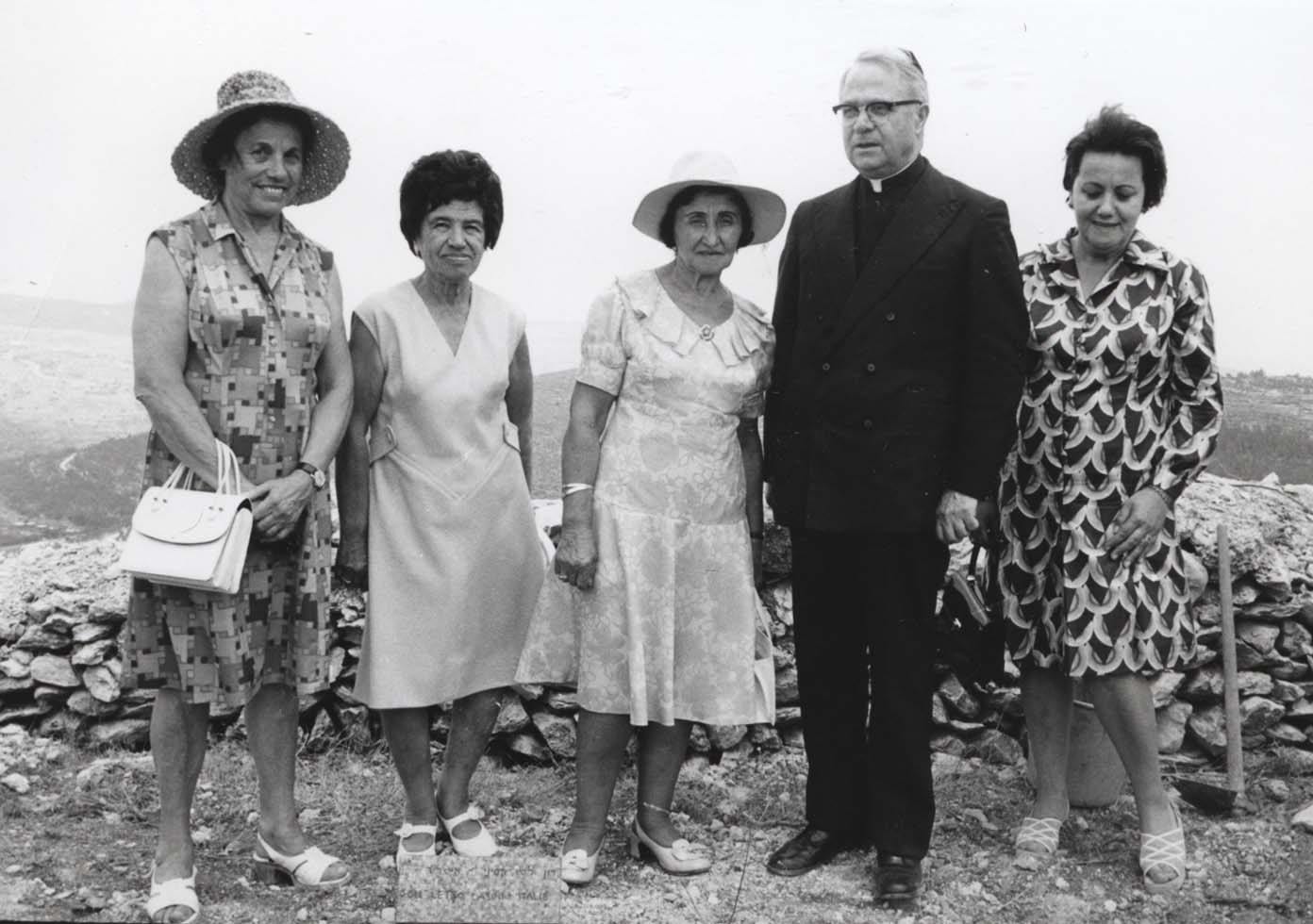
Matilde with Don Leto Casini at the tree-planting ceremony in the Garden of the Righteous Among the Nations in 1962

Matilde's role was to visit these monasteries alongside Father Cipriano and persuade the nuns to agree to hide the refugees. This was not an easy task, many of the nuns feared for their own safety, some monasteries were strictly cloistered women's institutions unwilling to admit men, and, ultimately, these were Jewish refugees, burdened with all the prejudices of the time.

Despite these challenges, many hiding places were found. Some were discovered by SS soldiers and their Fascist collaborators, leading to the deportation of the Jewish inhabitants to concentration camps. However, many managed to survive the war. Unofficial estimates suggest that 300–400 people were saved thanks to this underground network.

== The Capture of Underground Members ==
On November 26, 1943, the underground held a meeting in a church building in the city center. Following a betrayal from within the group, SS soldiers raided the building and arrested those present, including Rabbi Nathan Cassuto (who was eventually deported to Auschwitz, where he perished). A few days later, additional members were arrested in the city center, including Anna, Rabbi Cassuto’s wife, and Raffaele Cantoni.

Matilde was late to the meeting on November 26 and escaped arrest, but she was now almost alone in the struggle. After another betrayal, the Fascist militia began searching for her and arrested her mother and brother, who were hiding in a pension in the city center.

In an attempt to secure their release, Matilde turned herself in to the police, but to no avail. However, with the help of an informant inside the police force, a man named Vincenzo Attanasio, they managed to escape custody before being handed over to the German authorities.

== Escape to Switzerland ==
Matilde realized that the noose was tightening around her. She continued working with the priests for a few more weeks, but in July 1944, she decided to flee to Switzerland with her brother.

Even in Switzerland, Matilde continued her work with children. Together with Cantoni and Astorre Mayer, she established a school in the town of Weggis, where about 100–150 Italian Jewish children studied.

== Return to Italy ==
After the war, Matilde returned to Italy but did not go back to Florence. Instead, she, along with Raffaele Cantoni, Umberto Nahon, and the scientist couple Luigi and Anna-Maria Gorini, established an orphanage for child survivors of the Holocaust in Casa di Sciesopoli, in the town of Selvino in northern Italy.

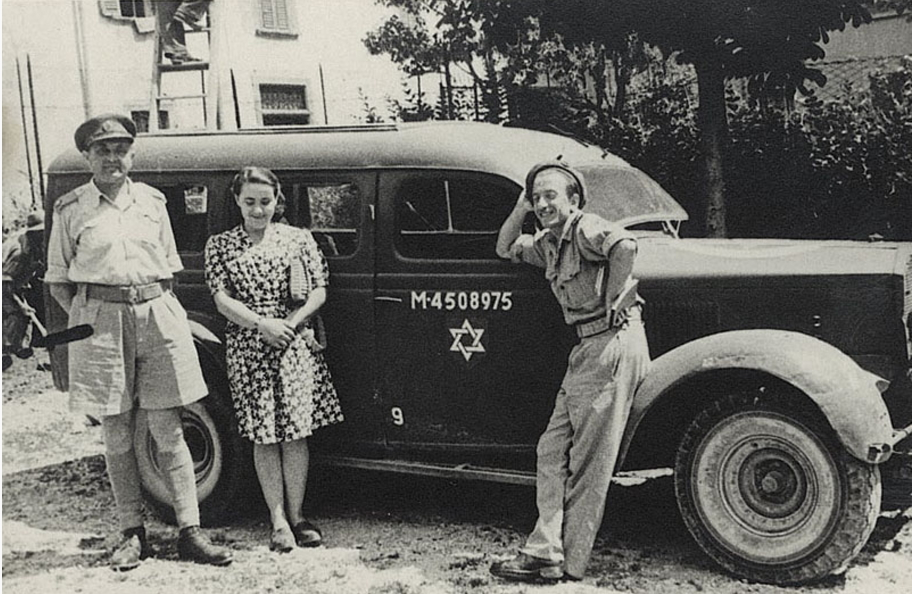
Matilde with soldiers of the Jewish Brigade

The institution was managed by Moshe Zeiri, a soldier from the Jewish Brigade, from Kibbutz Givat Shiller.

Matilde stayed in Selvino until November 1945, when she left to marry her fiancé, Max (Meir) Vardi, who had returned from the Land of Israel after they had been separated throughout the war.

== Immigration to Israel ==
After their marriage and the birth of Yoram their first child, Matilde and Max Vardi immigrated to Israel in March 1948.

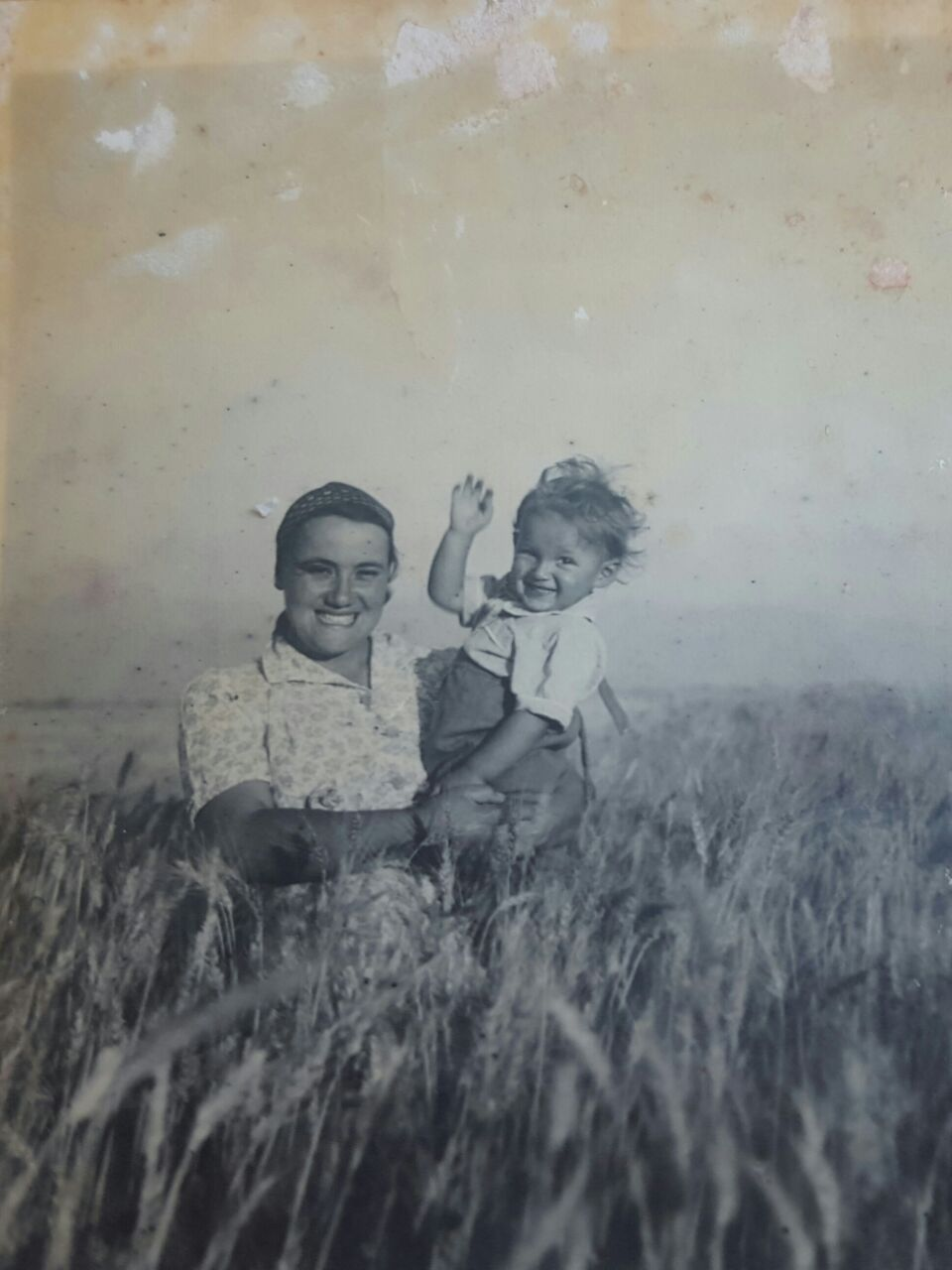
Matilde with Yoram at Kibbutz Sde Eliyahu, 1948

They spent a short period in Kibbutz Sde Eliyahu in the Beit She’an Valley, and later served in various official positions. Between 1949 and 1951, they were stationed in Tripoli, Libya, where Max helped organize the immigration of Libyan Jews to Israel.

Afterward, they held diplomatic roles in Europe, including in Brussels, Marseille, and Paris.

They had five children. Both Max and Matilde are buried in the cemetery of the village of Nataf in the Judean Hills.
