= DELASEM =

Italian and Jewish resistance organization

Delegation for the Assistance of Jewish Emigrants (Delegazione per l'Assistenza degli Emigranti Ebrei) or DELASEM, was an Italian and Jewish resistance organization that worked in Italy between 1939 and 1947. It is estimated that during World War II, DELASEM was able to distribute more than $1,200,000 in aid, of which nearly $900,000 came from outside Italy.

== Organization ==
DELASEM was organized on December 1, 1939, as an association authorized by the Fascist government, at the initiative of Dante Almansi and by the Jewish Genoese lawyer Lelio Vittorio Valobra, respectively Association Chairman and Vice-Chairman of the Union of Jewish Communities in Italy. Its official purpose was to help fellow refugees and foreigners that were interned in Italy and to facilitate emigration for them.

The foreign Jewish refugees in Italy were deprived of the most basic means of subsistence. They were deprived of their right of residence on Italian soil from the racial laws of 1938 and from June 15, 1940, on were detained in concentration camps, principally Ferramonti of Tarsia (Cosenza).

The headquarters of DELASEM was established in Genoa under the direction of Lelio Vittorio Valobra. Funds came mainly through Paris from international Jewish institutions such as the American Jewish Joint Distribution Committee and the Hebrew Immigrant Aid Society, but also from the collection of funds in Italy.

The organization was legal until September 8, 1943. Before and after being declared illegal, DELASEM received support from members of the Catholic Church, including the Pope: Jewish DELASEM member Giorgio Nissim of Pisa left writings stating that the priests he had worked with "had received the order to maintain relations [with DELASEM] by Pius XII, the Pope at the time." After the occupation of Paris, the Swiss acted as liaison between the DELASEM and international charitable organizations.

To implement its objectives, the DELASEM used a network of correspondents from among the fellow internees, displaced in camps and in places of internment. By a government circular dated May 18, 1942, the fascist Ministry of Interior recalled that the activities of these correspondents were limited exclusively "for charitable purposes and formalities of emigration." Despite limitations between 1939 and 1943, DELASEM succeeded to assist more than 9,000 Jewish refugees and to help 5,000 of them to leave Italy and reach neutral countries, primarily Spain.

Special attention was paid to children. In 1942, the "DELASEM dei Piccoli" was founded in Florence, with the specific purpose of giving assistance to children internees, offering them books, medical care, toys and clothes. In the camp Ferramonti di Tarsia, they established a "children’s canteen," which helped significantly to improve the lives of infants and children interned there. At Villa Emma Nonantola, the delegate DELASEM Mario Finzi, in collaboration with Father Arrigo Beccari and the Dr. Giuseppe Moreale organized an orphanage model that, for about a year, welcomed a group of a hundred children from Germany and the Balkans.

== The Underground during the Italian Social Republic (1943-45) ==
With the Armistice of Cassibile on September 8, 1943 and the beginning of the German occupation, DELASEM went underground. Defined by the Italian Social Republic as "foreign enemies" in November of that year by the Manifesto of Verona, over 6,000 Jews (men, women and children) would be deported from Italy and murdered in the extermination camp at Auschwitz.

Lelio Vittorio Valobra, helped by Raffaele Cantoni and Massimo Teglio, made contact with Cardinal Pietro Boetto, who headed the diocese of Genoa, and he instructed his secretary Father Francesco Repetto that the work could continue and DELASEM be provided with material assistance and shelter Jews, both Italians and foreigners. The arrests and the forced flight of Valobra and Cantoni to Switzerland led DELASEM to split in half between Rome and Genoa.

=== The Rome DELASEM ===
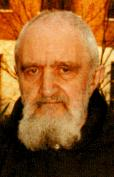
Father Maria Benedetto

Regular contacts with Rome, Genoa (and central funding in Switzerland) were interrupted abruptly with the arrest and flight to Switzerland of Raffaele Cantoni. The office Lungo Tevere Sanzio had to be closed but DELASEM continued to operate in Rome until the liberation under the leadership of the Jewish delegates Septimius Sorani, Giuseppe Levi, and the Capuchin Father Maria Benedetto. The Convento dei Cappuccini (Capuchin Convent) became the headquarters of the committee and the flow of funding was restored by using the mediation of the ambassadors of Great Britain and the United States of America at the Vatican, in addition to Father Maria Benedetto going twice to Genoa, returning to Rome with large sums of money. In the nine months of Nazi occupation, aid worth was "approximately 25,000,000 lira", was distributed and "assisted more than 4,000, including 1,500 foreigners and 2,500 Italians." The Rome DELASEM was also a place to find asylum and distribute false documents.

=== The DELASEM of Genoa ===
The flow of money between Switzerland (where Valobra and Cantoni operated) and the headquarters in Genoa always remained active due in part to the assistance of the Apostolic Nuncio in Bern, Msgr. Filippo Bernardini.

The collaboration between Massimo Teglio (a Jewish leader) and Cardinal Pietro Boetto of the Genoa Curia functioned as the central deployment of international aid to the Jews in north-central Italy during the entire period German occupation. To maintain the entire organization with Massimo Teglio, was Father Francesco Repetto, secretary of Cardinal Boetto. Wanted by the Gestapo in July 1944, Father Repetto, was forced to hide in the mountains, and Father Carlo Salvi will continued to work with Massimo Teglio until the Liberation.

==== Links between Genoa and central and northern Italy ====
To act as couriers between Genoa and the Jews in central and northern Italy were Raffaele Cantoni (until his expatriation), Mario Finzi (until his arrest and deportation) and Giorgio Nissim (that continued to operate in Tuscany throughout the war period) and a group of priests for which Father Repetto dispose a precise program of travel to deploy funds received from Switzerland.

Archbishop Giovanni Cicali reached several locations, including Florence and Arezzo. Father Giovanni De Micheli went to Penne, Teramo, Chieti, Ascoli Piceno, Macerata and San Severino Marche. Father Alessandro Piazza (which was then Bishop of Albenga) reached Brescia and then Como. Father Gian Maria Rotondi went to Siena, Grosseto, Lucca and Pescia. Father Carlo Salvi went to Verona, Rovigo, Belluno, Treviso and Vittorio Veneto. Father Traverso Natale went to Turin and Assisi. Father Raffaele Storace reached first Asti and then Aosta, Susa, Casale, Ivrea, Alba and Pinerolo. Father Giuseppe Viola visited the community of Mondovì, Cuneo and Fossano.

All these journeys and the delivery of funds had precise documentation with receipts of Cardinals, bishops and pastors, and the amounts delivered on behalf of Cardinal Boetto.

=== The DELASEM of Florence ===
In Florence, under the leadership of Rabbi Nathan Cassuto, the local Jewish community collaborated with DELASEM to support refugees. They provided shelter in abandoned public buildings and ensured access to food, clothing, and medical care. During this period, the Fascist authorities largely overlooked these humanitarian efforts. Recognizing the unique needs of refugee children, Matilde Cassin, along with the Laskar sisters and others, founded "DELASEM dei Piccoli" (DELASEM for the Children). This initiative maintained records of refugee children and their hiding places, sent them packages with books and sweets, and maintained regular contact with them. After the German occupation of Italy in September 1943, DELASEM's activities in Florence became clandestine. Despite the increased risks, members continued their efforts to assist and hide Jewish refugees. The organization relied on a broad network that included Jewish community members, clergy, and ordinary citizens. Notably, Archbishop Elia Dalla Costa of Florence instructed his clergy to aid DELASEM, and priests such as Father Leto Casini, Father Cipriano Ricotti, and Father Giulio Facibeni played significant roles in sheltering and assisting Jews. The clandestine DELASEM group in Florence was betrayed by an informant named Marco Ischia, who was working for a wealthy Polish-Jewish refugee and had infiltrated the organization. On November 26, 1943, acting on Ischia's information, Nazi forces raided a meeting of the group held at a church building in the city center, arresting several key members, including Rabbi Nathan Cassuto. This betrayal led to further arrests, including that of Rabbi Cassuto's wife, Anna, who was deceived into a trap by Ischia under the pretense of providing information about her husband's whereabouts. Through these collective efforts, DELASEM in Florence and the broader Tuscany region significantly contributed to the rescue and survival of hundreds of Jews during the Holocaust.

== The organization at the local level ==
At a local level DELASEM, due to its contacts already established in previous years, could count on a broad and inclusive network of complicity between Jews, member of the Italian resistance, priests, citizens, simple police, officials, and even some members of the German army.

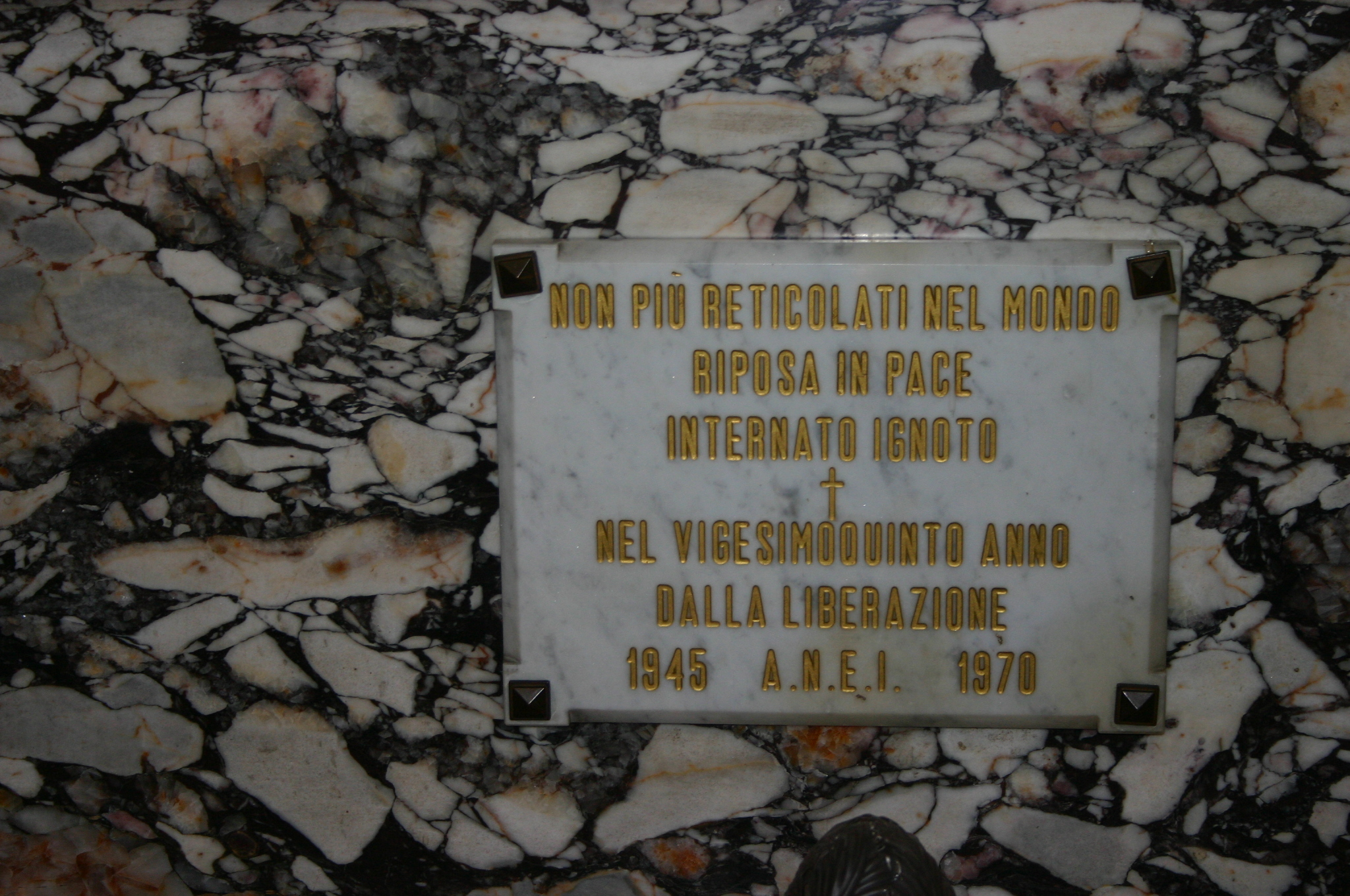
Plaque dated 1970 inside the San Sebastiano "civic temple" in Milan Italy, “in memory of the Unknown Deportee.

Even amid many difficulties, DELASEM showed great effectiveness in providing assistance for the maintenance, housing, and in many cases the illegal emigration to Switzerland of some 35,000 Italian and foreign Jews who survived persecution in Italy. Genoa, Rome, Turin, Milan, Assisi, Florence, Lucca, Borgo San Dalmazzo were some of the centers in which DELASEM succeeded to operate more effectively.

To manage DELASEM during the period of the underground were mainly Jews:

- Raffaele Cantoni and Lelio Vittorio Valobra exiled in Switzerland;
- Massimo Teglio and Rabbi Riccardo Pacifici at Genoa;
- Rabbi Nathan Cassuto and Matilde Cassin in Florence;
- Raffaele Jona in Piedmont;
- Mario Finzi in Bologna;
- Septimius Sorani and Joseph Levi in Rome;
- The arrests and deportations (of which, among others, were Richard Pacifici, Nathan Cassuto and Mario Finzi) increased the responsibility of non-Jewish members, who contributed significantly in keeping alive the flow of aid.

Among non-Jews who came into contact with the DELASEM or worked for it are:

- Bishops Pietro Boetto of Genova, Elia Dalla Costa of Florence, Giuseppe Placido Nicolini of Assisi, Maurilio Fossati of Torino, Alfredo Ildefonso Schuster of Milan, and Antonio Torrini at Lucca;
- Father Francesco Repetto, Father Carlo Salvi in Genoa, Msgr. Vincenzo Barale in Turin, Father Leto Casini, Father Cipriano Ricotti, Father Giulio Facibeni, Msgr. James Meneghello and Father Enrico Bartoletti in Florence, Father Arturo Paoli in Lucca, Father Giuseppe Bicchierai in Milan, Fathers Raimondo Viale and Francesco Brondello at Borgo San Dalmazzo, Fathers Arrigo Beccari Nonantola, Aldo Brunacci and Rufino Nicacci at Assisi, Father Federico Vincenti in Perugia, Fathers Maria Benedetto, Armando Alessandrini, Francesco Antonioli in Rome;
- Laity such as Claudio Lastrina, Angelo De Fiore, Odoardo Focherini, Louis and Trento Brizi, Giuseppe Moreali, and Giorgio La Pira.

The memories of many of them are honored at Yad Vashem as that of the "Righteous among the Nations".

=== The Rescue of the Children of Villa Emma ===
A spectacular example of the organizational capacity of the DELASEM relates to the saving of the children of Villa Emma at Nonantola. Due to the efforts of Father Arrigo Beccari and Giueseppi Moreali, in less than 36 hours upon arrival of the Germans in September 1943, more than a hundred residents of the DELASEM orphanage were hidden among the families of the area and subsequently transferred illegally to Switzerland. Only one of them, who was sick and had been entrusted to a sanatorium, was captured and was murdered at Auschwitz. The book Fields of the Duce: the civilian internment in Fascist Italy (1930–1943), by Charles Spartacus Capogreco, details this escape, and 2004 television movie The Flight of the Innocents was made by European station RAI.

== The Post-war period (1945-47) ==
The nuclei of DELASEM regrouped quickly after the Liberation. The priority task of DELASEM became to bring together scattered families, especially children hidden in convents or in private, and the other to organize the emigration (yet illegal) to Palestine, territories then under the British mandate.

Emblematic in this respect, was the case of the ship Faith, was blocked at the port of La Spezia in April 1946 with over one thousand Jews from Eastern Europe bound for Palestine. It took a hunger strike, allegations from Communist newspaper L’Unità and the personal interest of Christian Democracy Prime Minister Alcide De Gasperi to unblock this situation.

== Bibliography ==
- Laura Bava: ’Aiding gli Ebrei’ - Delasem under fascism, 1939 to 1945. 2016, (Master of Arts (Thesis)). University of Notre Dame Australia.
- Renzo De Felice: The Jews in Fascist Italy. Enigma 2001, ISBN 1-929631-01-4.
- Silvano Longhi: Die Juden und der Widerstand gegen den Faschismus in Italien (1943-1945). LIT Verlag 2010, ISBN 978-3-643-10887-6.
- Rosa Paini, I sentieri della speranza. Profughi ebrei, Italia fascista e la “Delasem”, Xenia 1988.
- Klaus Voigt: Zuflucht auf Widerruf – Exil in Italien 1933-1945. Klett-Cotta 1993, Band 2, ISBN 3-608-91160-X.
- Susan Zuccotti: The Italians and the Holocaust: persecution, rescue and survival. Basic Books 1987, ISBN 1-870015-03-7.
