= Arrigo Beccari =

Italian Roman Catholic priest and educator (1909–2005)

Don Arrigo Beccari
- Born: Ario Beccari; 24 August 1909; Castelnuovo Rangone, Italy
- Died: 27 December 2005 (Age 96); Nonantola, Italy
- Occupations: priest, teacher
- Known for: Holocaust rescue

Don Arrigo Beccari (24 August 1909 – 27 December 2005), was an Italian priest and teacher. He was recognized as a Righteous Among the Nations for his rescue operation. During WWII he rescued about 120 Jews, most of them children from Villa Emma along with the town’s doctor Giuseppe Moreali.

== Early life ==
Don Arrigo Beccari was born in 1909 in Castelnuovo Rangone, Italy. He died in 2005 in Nonantola, Italy. In 1933 he was authorized as a priest and became a teacher in Nonantola’s Catholic seminary, which was located close to the town, in Modena. Beccari held an anti-fascist, Christian perspective, which also motivated him. Between the years 1939 and 1980 he served as a community priest at St Peter’s church in Rubbiara, near Nonantola, and then in Nonantola itself.

== Activity during WWII ==
Beccari’s activity during WWII took place mostly in Nonantola which is a northern Italian town in which “Villa Emma” was located. The Villa Emma used to be a home for Jewish orphan children. Since they arrived at the town, Beccari developed a strong relationship with them.

The village’s occupation by the Nazis in September 1943 caused Beccari and Joseph Ithai (a children’s guide) to be aware of the danger of keeping the Jewish children in Villa Emma. Arrigo Beccari persuaded the farmers to host the older children. The youngsters he hid in his seminary. During this period he protected and supplied their essential needs in addition to keeping the children in high spirits.

Once the Nazis conducted a search and enquiry about the missing children Beccari decided to keep his silence, consequently they beat him. Due to this incident and increased searches after the hiding of Jews, Don Arrigo Beccari and Giuseppe Moreali decided to smuggle the Jews outside of the German occupation.

Beccari and Moreali started to design a fleeing plan. The idea was to transfer the children to the Swiss border and then northward. Moreali issued 120 Jews fake identity cards and Beccari found people who would help the group on their way to the border. The children and the guides made their voyage by trains and on the evening of Yom Kippur 1943 they crossed the border.

After the success of the smuggling Beccari continued helping people. There was a stock that contained medicine and clothes, which was used by Beccari for Jewish refugees, for escaped prisoners (British soldiers) and for Italian partisans.

In 1944, Don Arrigo Beccari’s underground activity was exposed. He was arrested by Italian fascists, and they were delivered to the Nazis. In the Bologna jail Beccari underwent severe torture by the S.S for many months until his release. His name appeared on the execution list 3 times, but he kept quiet and didn't say a thing.

== Honors ==
- Knight of the Order of Merit of the Italian Republic (1961).
- Righteous Among the Nations (1964).
- In 1964 a tree was planted by Don Arrigo Beccari in his honor boulevard at Yad Vashem.
- Prelate of honor of His Holiness (1989).
- In 2016 Beccari was perpetuated with the rest of the Righteous Among the Nations of Nonantola, in a garden at Calvisano.
- A playground called “Nonantola” was established in Haifa, Israel to the memory of Beccari and Moreali.

== See also ==
- Villa Emma (Nonantola)
- Joseph Ithai
- Giuseppe Moreali
- The Holocaust in Italy
- DELASEM
- Knight of the Order of Merit of the Italian Republic
- Prelate of honor of His Holiness
