= Lelio Vittorio Valobra =

Italian resistance member

Lelio Valobra

Lelio Vittorio Valobra (1900 – 1976 in Genoa) was a Jewish Italian lawyer and the chairman of DELASEM, an exponent of the Jewish resistance. In 1935, Valobra was a leading member of the Jewish community of Genoa, and was the keynote speaker at the new synagogue in the city, stating: "The pride of being able to raise a temple ... is nourished in us by the political climate in which we live, ... and exaltation of sacrifice, that returned pride unto Italians themselves and the internal order which is essential to becoming a nation." In October 1938, after the passage of racial laws in Italy and the flight of Jews fleeing after the "annexation" of Austria by the Third Reich, Valobra, on recommendation of the Union of Italian Jewish Communities, of which he was vice-president, was commissioned to organize the relief activities and coordinate the stay of Jewish refugees in Italy.

== DELASEM ==
On December 1, 1939, an organization called DELASEM (Delegation for the Assistance of Emigrants), was founded by the Union of Italian Jewish Communities, and Valobra was called to its leadership. The purpose of the association was to help expatriation and survival for Jewish refugees both interned or confined and to those who had avoided internment.

Valobra was the protagonist of memorable actions for saving Jewish children: in the spring of 1942 he went to Ljubljana, Yugoslavia, where he knew there was a group of Eastern European Jewish children who had survived their parents' murder by the Nazis. Valobra picked up 42 children and managed to transport them during March–April 1943 to "Villa Emma" in Nonantola near Modena. At Nonantola they were hidden and protected by local people during the Nazi roundups until Valobra was able to provide for their expatriation to Switzerland.

== Relations with the Catholic Church ==
By September 8, 1943, the German occupation had set up the puppet state Italian Social Republic and ordered the specific roundup of Jews. Valobra, helped by Raffaele Cantoni and Massimo Teglio, made contact with Cardinal Pietro Boetto of the Catholic Church, who headed the diocese of Genoa, and who instructed his secretary Father Francesco Repetto that the work of DELASEM would continue and would provide material assistance and shelter to persecuted Jews, both Italians and foreigners. In November 1943, after the news about the deportation of Jews from Genoa and the community of Montecatini, Valobra was hidden by the Bishop of Chiavari, and had to flee to Switzerland, where he continued to manage DELASEM until the end of the war.

== Acknowledgements ==
The Valobra name is enshrined in the "Book of the Righteous" (or Golden book) in Jerusalem.
