= Filippo Bernardini =

Italian prelate

- Secretary of the Congregation for Propagation of the Faith
- Church: Catholic Church
- In office: 15 January 1953 – 26 August 1954
- Predecessor: Celso Benigno Luigi Costantini
- Successor: Pietro Sigismondi
- Other post: Titular Archbishop of Antiochia in Pisidia (1933-1954)
- Previous posts: Apostolic Nuncio to Switzerland (1935-1953); Apostolic Delegate to Australia (1933-1935)

Orders
- Ordination: 12 March 1910
- Consecration: 21 May 1933 by Pietro Fumasoni Biondi

Personal details
- Born: 11 November 1884 Pieve di Ussita, Province of Macerata, Kingdom of Italy
- Died: 26 August 1954 (aged 69) Pieve di Ussita, Marche, Italy

Filippo Bernardini (11 November 1884 – 26 August 1954) was an Italian prelate of the Catholic Church. He spent almost his entire career in the diplomatic service of the Holy See and was given the rank of archbishop in 1933. He was Apostolic Delegate to Australia for two years before taking up the position of Apostolic Nuncio to Switzerland, where he served from 1935 to 1953. During World War II, he was active in the Catholic resistance to Nazism and provided assistance to Jews during the Nazi Holocaust. He served briefly as Secretary of the Congregation for Propagation of the Faith just before his death. Before entering the diplomatic service, he spent 19 years as a teacher and administrator at the Catholic University of America.

He was the nephew of Cardinal Secretary of State Pietro Gasparri (1852-1934), one of the leading Church figures of his era.

== Biography ==
Bernardini was born in Pieve di Ussita, in the province of Macerata, Italy, on 11 November 1884. He was ordained as a Catholic priest on 12 March 1910. He taught in Rome at the Pontifical Athenaeum of Sant'Apollinare before becoming Professor of Canon Law at the Catholic University of America in 1914 and left 19 years later as Dean of the Faculty of Canon Law there. He spent the last two of his years associated with Catholic University on sabbatical in Rome helping to edit his uncle's two-volume treatise on marriage and other writings. While teaching, he had also served as secretary of the pontifical commission that produced the 1917 Code of Canon Law.

Pope Pius XI appointed him Apostolic Delegate to Australia and Titular Archbishop of Antiochia in Pisidia on 20 March 1933 and consecrated on 21 May. In 1935, he was posted to Switzerland as Apostolic Nuncio. In this capacity, he served as a Vatican diplomat in a neutral country during the Second World War and the Nazi Holocaust. He was among the many Vatican diplomats who acted honourably to assist Jews during the Holocaust. He sent intelligence to the Vatican about the Nazi plans against the Jews. In 1944, he was instrumental in maintaining the lines of communication between Lelio Vittorio Valobra, head of the clandestine DELASEM Jewish rescue organisation (settled in Zurich) and the organisation's Fr. Francesco Repetto, who was still in Genoa. At the Genoa Curia, many letters arrived from Jews in the Vatican seeking news of their relatives and acquaintances in northern Italy. The flow of money between Switzerland (where Valobra and Raffaele Cantoni operated) and the DELASEM headquarters in Genoa always remained active due in part to the assistance of Bernardini.

He was mentioned as a possible choice for appointment as Vatican Secretary of State in 1945.

Bernardini was appointed Secretary of the Congregation for Propagation of the Faith on 15 January 1953. He died of a heart attack on 26 August 1954 while visiting the village where he was born.
