= Massimo Teglio =

Italian aviator (1900–1990)

Massimo Teglio (Genoa, 2 August 1900 – Genoa, 31 January 1990) was an Italian aviator responsible for DELASEM for Northern Italy from 1943 to 1945.

== Biography ==
His father Roberto co-owned with his brothers in Genoa the firm "Fratelli Teglio", now known as Icat Food, a fish canning business founded in 1850 by their grandfather Laudadio Teglio, a native of Modena. Laudadio, who had thirteen children, set up a trade in fish with sardine packing factories he established in England at Polperro, Looe and Plymouth that are still standing, and which were managed by his son, Guglielmo (1861–1926), who settled in Plymouth.

The Teglio family was of Sephardi Jewish origin and was present in Modena from the beginning of the eighteenth century, with the surname Telio, which is probably a variant of the surname Telo, used by Spanish Jews before the expulsion.

In 1917 he volunteered for the newly-formed military air force and attended a pilot training course but he did not qualify as a pilot before the end of World War I.

He initially worked in the family firm but he left this because he preferred piloting planes and hydroplanes. He founded the Genoa aeronautical club.

He was a friend of leading Fascist Italo Balbo, having flown with him, and took part on three occasions in the air shows organised by him as governor of Libya. He was warmly greeted publicly by Balbo during his last visit to Genoa in 1939 after the promulgation of the Italian racial laws.

When the Nazis arrived in Genoa in September 1943 he engaged in helping persecuted Jews, with the support of the church. Despite the million-lira bounty placed on his head by the Fascists with the help of forged papers and his many friends he was able to evade capture and was nicknamed the Jewish Scarlet Pimpernel. After Lelio Vittorio Valobra fled to Switzerland he became the leader for northern Italy of DELASEM, the Organisation for Assisting Jewish Emigration, with its headquarters in Genoa, thanks to the support of the archbishop of Genoa, Cardinal Pietro Boetto, and his secretary, Fr Francesco Repetto.

He improved the system used by Delasem for fabricating false ID cards using headed official notepaper from various local authorities in southern Italy that had been liberated by the Allies, and found an engraver who could manufacture rubber stamps for authorising documents. He found a safe way to lead fleeing Jews as far as Switzerland, coordinating their departures with Leo Biaggi de Blasys, the Italian representative of the International Red Cross, so that they weren't sent back by the Swiss authorities, and he fixed a safe point for crossing the border on an estate that overlapped the frontier in the area of Lieto Colle. With Fr Francesco Repetto's help he succeeded in bringing to Genoa and thence to Switzerland many Jews who had fled from France in the area of Borgo San Dalmazzo following the withdrawal of Italian troops after 8 September 1943.

Once he had gone underground he moved home frequently in Genoa and avoided a regular timetable. He trimmed his eyebrows and started wearing glasses

He risked death during American bombings on 19 May 1944, after a bomb fell on the archbishop's palace where he was waiting for Fr Repetto. Teglio also had false papers made for the Genoese priest Giacomo Lercaro, the future archbishop of Bologna, to help him escape when he was sought by the Germans

From 1944 he was assisted in rebuilding the Delasem network by Achille Malcovati, an important Milanese businessman who was a director of the Genoa central dairy and linked to the Catholic church in Genoa. In 1944 Teglio moved to Milan, staying in his house under false papers and working as his chauffeur, as Malcovati had many cars and lorries with German permits. In this way he could distribute Delasem funds to people hiding Jews whilst delivering cheese and butter

Thanks to Fr Repetto he was able to hide his daughter Nicoletta in the Sacred Heart convent at Sturla; he protected his parents, and his sisters Laura and Emma with her husband Bruno Debenedetti and their sons Franco and Sergio, keeping them hidden at Morbello in Piedmont in a country property that belonged to a retired policeman, whilst his sister Margherita, together with her husband Achille Vitale and their young children Claudio and Lia Vitale were arrested on 5 November 1943 at Montecatini, deported, and killed at Auschwitz

He saved the family business from compulsory aryanisation, changing its name to Copeco, and transferring ownership to his Catholic daughter, and naming as business manager Giorgio Parodi, an important Genoese businessman and his friend at the Aeroclub

Massimo Teglio's actions were recorded in the book Benevolence and Betrayal: Five Italian Jewish Families Under Fascism by Alexander Stille; the chapter "The Rabbi, the Priest and the Aviator: A Story of Rescue in Genoa", was made the subject of the Canale 5 film Fuga per la Libertà – l’aviatore, where he was played by Sergio Castellitto, which was broadcast on 25 January 2008. It was filmed with the cooperation of his nephew Franco Debenedetti Teglio, who had known him well.

== Bibliography ==
- Audio interview by Michele Sarfatti with Massimo Teglio, CDEC, 1985
- Alexander Stille, Uno su mille. Cinque famiglie ebraiche durante il fascismo in the chapter Il Rabbino, il prete e l’aviatore: una storia di salvataggio a Genova, Garzanti Libri, Milano, 2011; first English edition Benevolence and Betrayal, 1991, ISBN 88-04-34012-6
- Fuga per la libertà – l’aviatore dramatised on Canale 5 where Teglio was played by Sergio Castellitto, broadcast 25 January 2008.
- Teglio l‘aviatore che ingannò le SS per salvare ebrei, Il Giornale, Alberto Rosselli, 2008
- Lo Schindler di Genova diventa film, Quotidiano.net, 2008
- Quell’uomo era mio padre, Intervista a Nicoletta Teglio, Nuova Sardegna, 2008
- I bambini e le persecuzioni razziali di Franco Debenedetti Teglio, Tododante, 2008
- Giornata della Cultura 2018, UCEI
