= Giuseppe Siri =

Italian cardinal (1906–1989)

His Eminence Giuseppe Siri
- Cardinal, Archbishop of Genoa
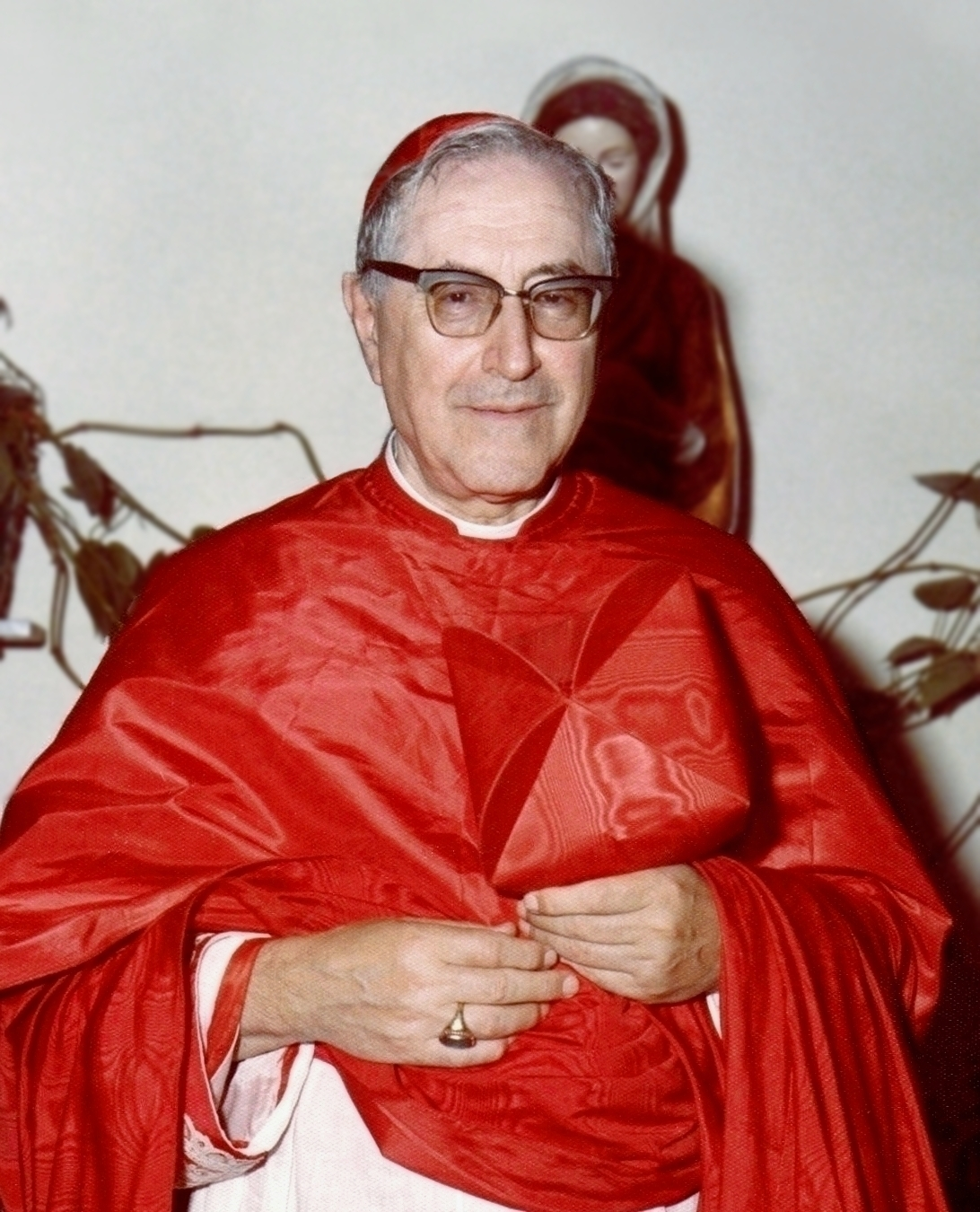
- Cardinal Siri in the 1970s
- Archdiocese: Genoa
- See: Genoa
- Appointed: 14 May 1946
- Installed: 29 May 1946
- Term ended: 6 July 1987
- Predecessor: Pietro Boetto
- Successor: Giovanni Canestri
- Other post: Cardinal-Priest of Santa Maria della Vittoria (1953–89)
- Previous posts: Auxiliary Bishop of Genoa (1944–46); Titular Bishop of Livias (1944–46)

Orders
- Ordination: 22 September 1928 by Carlo Dalmazio Minoretti
- Consecration: 7 May 1944 by Pietro Boetto
- Created cardinal: 12 January 1953 by Pope Pius XII
- Rank: Cardinal-priest

Personal details
- Born: Giuseppe Siri; 20 May 1906 Genoa, Kingdom of Italy
- Died: 2 May 1989 (aged 82) Genoa, Italy
- Denomination: Roman Catholic
- Education: Pontifical Gregorian University
- Motto: Non Nobis Domine (Not to Us, Lord) — Psalm 115:1
- Coat of arms

Giuseppe Siri (20 May 1906 – 2 May 1989) was an Italian cardinal of the Catholic Church who served as Archbishop of Genoa from 1946 to 1987, and was elevated to the rank of cardinal in 1953. A protégé of Pope Pius XII, he took part in the Second Vatican Council and was considered a papabile for 20 years, during the conclaves of 1958, 1963, August 1978 and October 1978.

== Early life and ministry ==
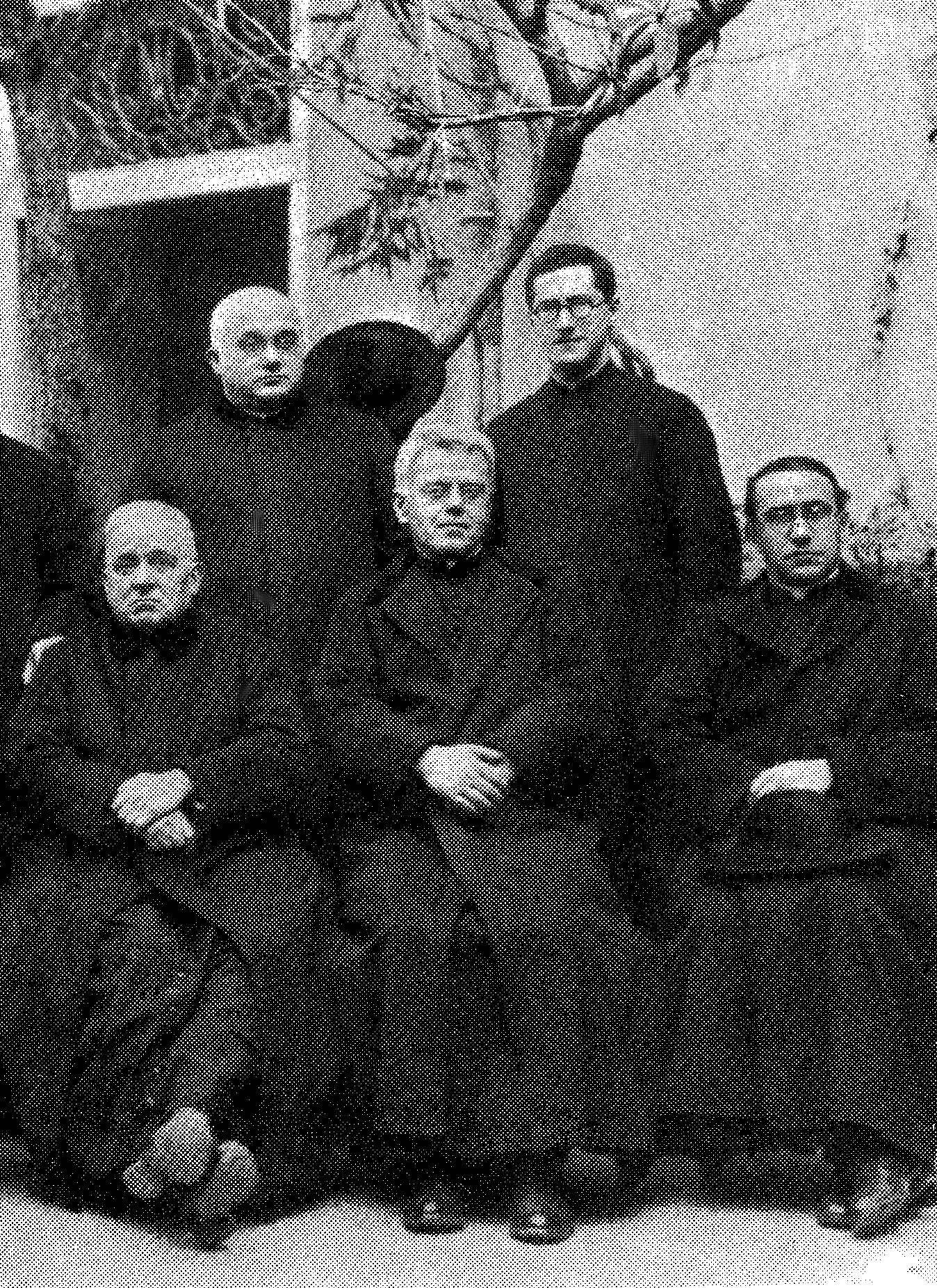
Siri (first on the right, back row) in 1930

Siri was born in Genoa to Nicolò and Giulia (née Bellavista) Siri. He entered the minor seminary of Genoa on 16 October 1916, and attended the major seminary from 1917 to 1926. Siri then studied at the Pontifical Gregorian University in Rome, and was ordained to the priesthood by Archbishop Carlo Minoretti on 22 September 1928. Finishing his studies at the Gregorian, he earned his doctorate in theology summa cum laude and also did pastoral work in Rome until autumn 1929.

Upon returning to Genoa, Siri served as a chaplain until he became a professor of dogmatic theology at the major seminary in 1930, also teaching fundamental theology for a year. In addition to his academic duties, Siri was a preacher, public speaker, and professor of religion at the classical lyceums named to Andrea Doria and Giuseppe Mazzini from 1931 to 1936. He was named prosynodal examiner in the archdiocesan curia in 1936 and rector of Collegio Teologico S. Tommaso d'Aquino in 1937.

== Episcopal career ==
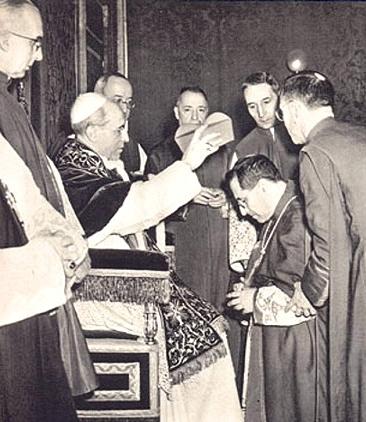
Pope Pius XII bestows the red biretta upon Siri in 1953.

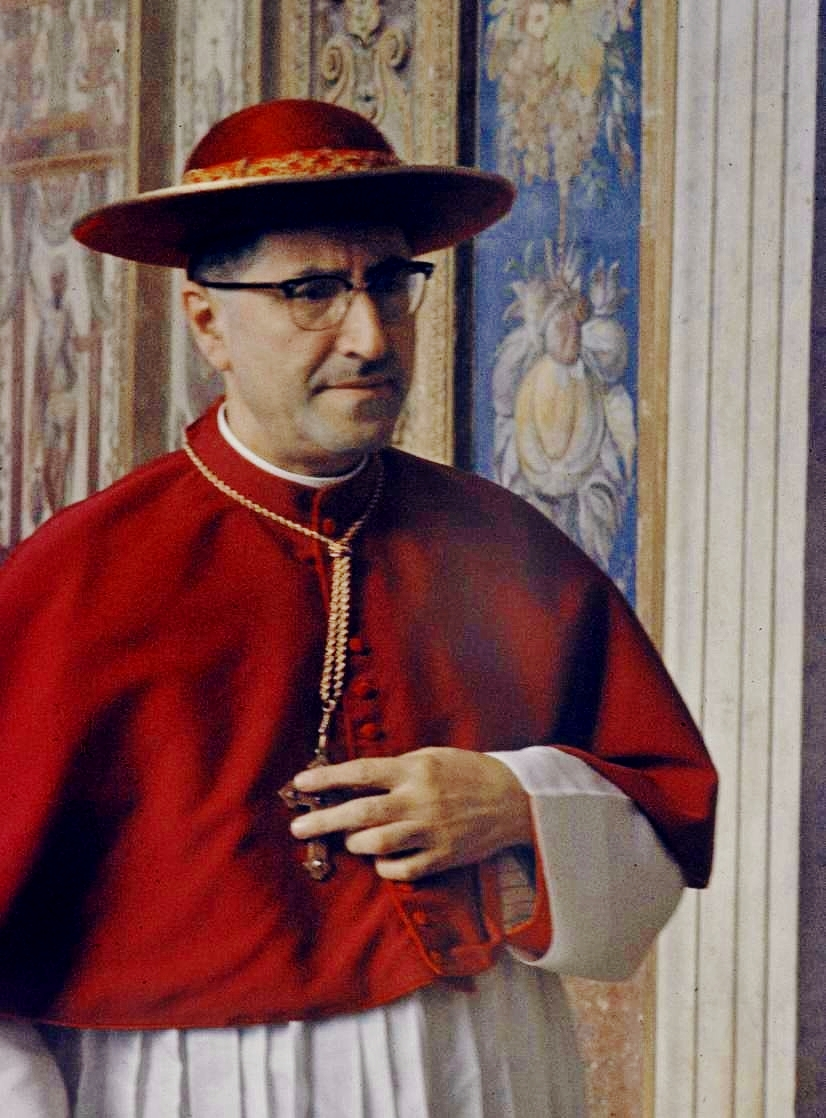
Siri in 1958

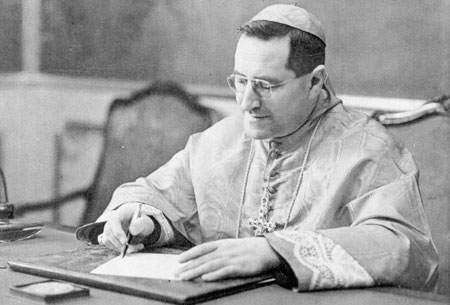
Siri in 1960

On 14 March 1944, Siri was appointed Auxiliary Bishop of Genoa and Titular Bishop of Livias by Pope Pius XII. He received his episcopal consecration on the following 7 May from Cardinal Pietro Boetto at the St. Lawrence Cathedral. He became vicar general for the archdiocese on 8 September 1944. During his tenure as an auxiliary, he was a member of the Italian resistance movement in World War II. He negotiated with the Nazi forces surrounding Genoa and met secretly with partisan leaders, eventually arranging a Nazi surrender that avoided further bombardment of the city.

Following the death of Cardinal Boetto, Siri was named Archbishop of Genoa on 14 May 1946, and installed on 29 May of that year. Pius XII made him Cardinal-Priest of Santa Maria della Vittoria, Rome, in the consistory of 12 January 1953. At the time of his elevation, he was the youngest member of the College of Cardinals. He became known as the "minestrone cardinal" for his relief work in soup kitchens.

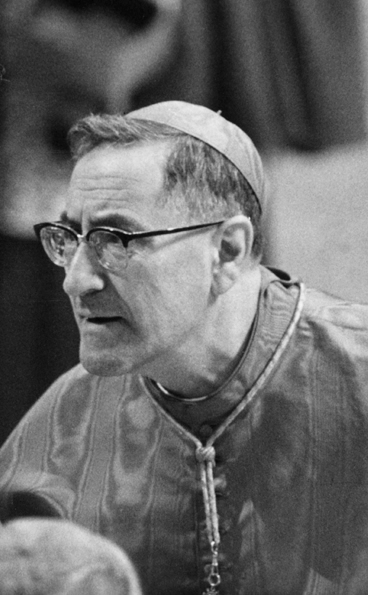
Siri during the Second Vatican Council

Pope John XXIII named Siri the first president of the Italian Episcopal Conference on 12 October 1959. He remained in that post until 1965. He was noted for his staunchly conservative views. At the Second Vatican Council (1962–1965), he sat on its Board of Presidency but was anxious that the council's progress in renewing the Catholic Church could be happening too quickly. Alongside Archbishop Marcel Lefebvre and Cardinals Alfredo Ottaviani and Thomas Cooray, he was part of the association of traditionalist Council fathers named Coetus Internationalis Patrum but Siri commented, "I would describe myself as an independent, a man who walks alone and is not a member of any group." He was opposed to collegiality, as well as innovation.

Siri, who had voted in the papal conclaves of 1958 and 1963, was also one of the cardinal electors in the August and October 1978 conclaves. He was a strong candidate for the papacy, or papabile, in all four conclaves, in which his support lay mostly with curialists and other conservative cardinals. Media reports suggested that Siri in fact topped the first count of votes in the August 1978 conclave before losing to Albino Luciani, who became Pope John Paul I. Following John Paul I's death, Siri was the leading conservative candidate in opposition to Cardinal Giovanni Benelli, the Archbishop of Florence and leading liberal candidate. Vaticanologists suggested that the eventual winner, Cardinal Wojtyła, who became Pope John Paul II, was chosen as a compromise candidate between the two. Shortly afterwards, Time magazine implied that Siri disapproved of Wojtyła's election.

In a biography of Siri, Nicla Buonasorte reports that Siri was a friend of Archbishop Marcel Lefebvre but disapproved of his reported schismatic activities. Even until the last minute, Siri begged him ("on his knees") not to break with the Holy See. In the end, Siri resigned himself to the inevitability of his friend's excommunication. Buonasorte commented: "In all probability, it is due to Siri that Lefebvre had no significant following in Italy."

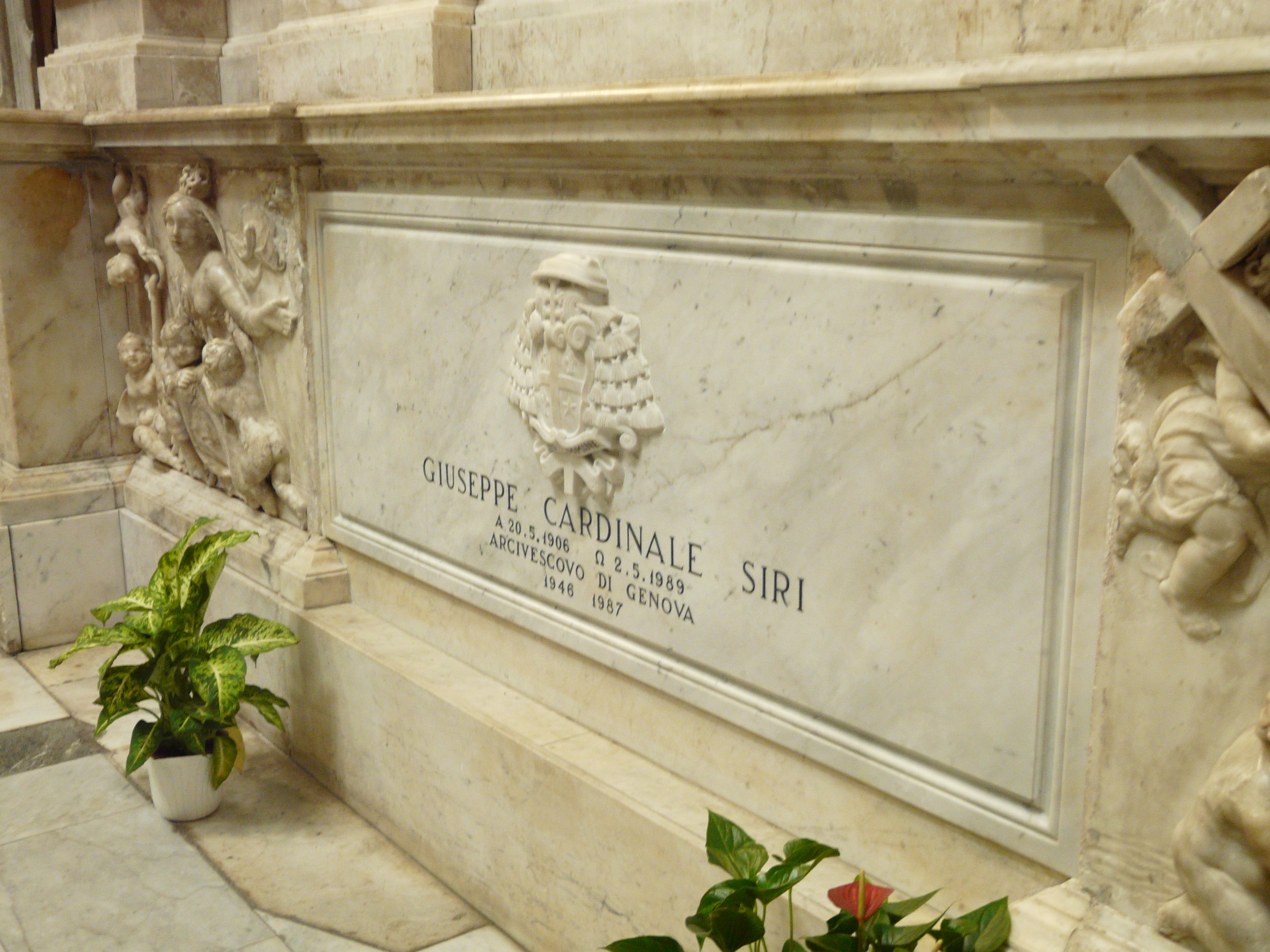
Siri's tomb in the Genoa Cathedral

Siri reached age 80 in 1986 and thus lost the right to participate in future conclaves; he was the last remaining cardinal elector who had been elevated by Pope Pius XII. Siri resigned from his post in Genoa on 6 July 1987, after 41 years of service. He died in Villa Campostano, Genoa, at age 82, and was buried at San Lorenzo Metropolitan Cathedral in Genoa.

== Conspiracy theory ==
Amongst some sedevacantists, there is a conspiracy theory that Siri was elected pope at either the 1958, 1963, August 1978, or the October 1978 papal conclave (different accounts vary). Siri himself never made these claims and accepted the authority of all popes in his lifetime.

== Bibliography ==
- Spiazzi, Raimondo, ed. (1990). Il cardinale Giuseppe Siri, arcivescovo di Genova dal 1946 al 1987: la vita, l'insegnamento, l'eredità spirituale, le memorie (in Italian). Bologna: Studio domenicano. ISBN 88-7094-018-7.
- Buonasorte, Nicla (2006). Siri: tradizione e Novecento (in Italian). Bologna: Il Mulino. ISBN 88-15-11350-9.
- Siri, Giuseppe (1980). Getsemani: Riflessioni sul movimento teologico contemporaneo (in Italian). Rome: Fraternità della SS. Vergine Maria. ICCU IT\ICCU\TO0\0554891.
- Lai, Benny (1993). Il Papa non eletto: Giuseppe Siri, cardinale di Santa Romana Chiesa (in Italian). Rome: Laterza. ISBN 88-420-4267-6.

Catholic Church titles
Preceded by Pietro Boetto	Archbishop of Genoa; 14 May 1946 – 6 July 1987	Succeeded by Giovanni Canestri
Preceded by Maurilio Fossati	President of the Italian Episcopal Conference; 1959–1965	Succeeded by Collective Presidency of Giovanni Colombo, Ermenegildo Florit and Giovanni Urbani
Preceded by Carlos Vasconcellos	Cardinal Protopriest; 18 September 1982 – 2 May 1989	Succeeded by Franz König
