= Enrico Bartoletti =

Italian Roman Chatolic archbishop

Servant of God Enrico Bartoletti
- Archbishop Emeritus of Lucca
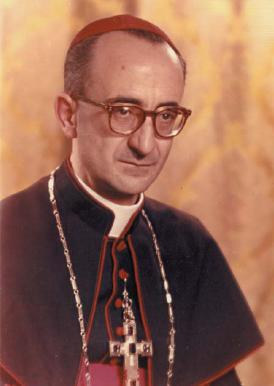
- Church: Roman Catholic Church
- Archdiocese: Lucca
- See: Lucca
- Appointed: 20 January 1973
- Installed: 1973
- Term ended: 31 March 1973
- Other post: Secretary General of the Italian Episcopal Conference (1972–1976)
- Previous posts: Titular Bishop of Myndus (1958–1971); Auxiliary Bishop of Lucca (1958–1971); Titular Archbishop of Myndus (1971–1973); Coadjutor Archbishop of Lucca (1971–1973)

Orders
- Ordination: 27 July 1939 by Elia Dalla Costa
- Consecration: 8 September 1958 by Ermenegildo Florit
- Rank: Archbishop

Personal details
- Born: Enrico Bartoletti; 7 October 1916 Calenzano, Florence, Kingdom of Italy
- Died: 5 March 1976 (aged 59) Gemelli Hospital, Rome, Italy

Styles of Enrico Bartoletti
- Reference style: The Most Reverend
- Spoken style: Your Grace or My Lord Archbishop
- Religious style: Archbishop

Enrico Bartoletti (7 October 1916 – 5 March 1976) was an Italian Roman Catholic archbishop who served on the Italian Episcopal Conference and also as the Archbishop of Lucca. He is known for his personal holiness and for his political tact which he delivered while serving on the Italian Episcopal Conference. He also worked to defend the lives of the Jewish people during World War II and contributed to DELASEM.

Bartoletti was granted the title Servant of God on 4 September 2007 in formal approval to the introduction of the cause. The beatification process commenced on 11 November in the Archdiocese of Lucca.

== Life ==
Enrico Bartoletti was born on 7 October 1916 in Florence. He commenced his studies for the priesthood in Florence in 1937 and was later sent to Rome for his theological studies at the Almo Collegio Capranica there in 1934. It was there that he met Giulio Belvederi and the rector - and future cardinal - Augustin Bea. He also attended the Gregorian University for additional studies. Upon his return to Florence he received his ordination to the priesthood from Elia Dalla Costa in 1939; his return was short lived for he returned to Rome for further studies at the Pontifical Biblical Institute in sacred scripture.

Bartoletti was made the rector of the Minor Seminary in 1943 and served as a teacher of the Greek and Hebrew languages in addition to serving as a teacher of sacred scripture. During World War II he made his support of the Jewish people known and was quite vocal of the injustices against them during the Holocaust that Nazi Germany was perpetrating; due to this he collaborated with DELASEM and was even arrested on 8 December 1943 though released with strong threats and warnings. In 1955 he was made the rector of the Major Seminary.

Upon his return home he was made the director of the Minor Seminary. Pope Pius XII appointed him as the Auxiliary Bishop of Lucca which meant that Bartoletti would need to be made a bishop; he received his episcopal consecration on 8 September 1958 from Ermenegildo Florit. In Lucca he was seen as a strong leader of moral principle with the knack for being a careful mediator. With Pope John XXIII introducing the Second Vatican Council, Bartoletti was known for his remarkable contribution to catechetical and liturgical reform.

In 1966 he was appointed as the see's Apostolic Administrator until the elevation of a new archbishop and then - in 1971 - was appointed as the Coajutor Archbishop of Lucca with the "right of succession" upon the death or resignation of the current head. Bartoletti became the Archbishop of Lucca in 1973 and was installed not long after. Pope Paul VI appointed him as the Secretary General of the Italian Bishop's Conference in 1972; he possessed great political tact in realizing and addressing the potential consequences of a referendum on divorce. He resigned as Archbishop of Lucca on 31 March 1973 and lived a quiet life after submitting his resignation.

Bartoletti died in the morning of 5 March 1976 of a heart attack in the Gemelli Hospital in Rome; he was buried 6 March 1976 in the Cathedral of San Martino.

== Beatification process ==
The official announcement that Lucca would petition for Bartoletti's cause of sanctification came on 8 December 1998 following a diocesan event.

The transfer of the competent forum for the process was transferred from Rome to Lucca on 28 June 2007. The title Servant of God was bestowed upon Bartoletti on 4 September 2007 after the Congregation for the Causes of Saints - under Pope Benedict XVI - granted their approval to the beginning of the process. The diocesan process opened on 11 November 2007. The process concluded at a closing Mass held on 9 October 2016.

The first postulator from the beginning of the cause was the Capuchin Carlo Calloni while the current postulator is the Capuchin friar Florio Tessari. The vice-postulator is Emilio Citti.
