= Mario Finzi =

- Born: 15 July 1913; Bologna, Italy
- Died: 22 February 1945 (aged 31); Auschwitz-Birkenau, German-occupied Poland
- Occupations: Pianist, musician, magistrate, teacher Jewish activist and resistance partisan, member of DELASEM

Mario Finzi (15 July 1913 – 22 February 1945) was a Jewish Italian lawyer who died in the Holocaust during World War II.

== Early life and career ==
Finzi was born in Bologna, Italy, from an Italian Jewish family: both his father Amerigo Finzi, and his mother, Ebe Castelfranchi, were teachers.

A musician of great talent, he graduated when he was only 15, winning a State prize from the Ministry of Education, thereafter beginning a musical career of successful concerts. At the same time, he studied Law, and was awarded his degree summa cum laude at 20, also winning the King's Prize.

Only 24, Finzi was already a magistrate and a judge. In 1938 he began his legal career in Milan, but he was soon hampered by the Fascist racist laws promulgated in Italy that very year. Moving to Paris, he dedicated himself totally to music as a pianist, under contract with the French Radio.

When war exploded in Europe, Finzi was in Italy to renew his French visa, and thus could not return to Paris. He died in the Holocaust.

== Assisting the Jews ==
Finzi began to teach at the Bologna Jewish School and between 1940 and 1943 was active as the local delegate of DELASEM ^{(see note 1)}, a Jewish organisation for the assistance of Jewish refugees in Italy. He was directly involved in the Villa Emma experience at Nonantola, where hundreds of Jewish orphans from Germany and the Balkans were finding shelter. Finzi was the one to welcome them at the Venice station, the first train of young refugees coming from Croatia, then preparing their billeting at Nonantola. Several times he cycled all the way from Bologna, in order to visit the children, play with them and play some piano music for them.

After 8 September 1943 and the German occupation of Italy, Finzi continued underground his assistance of persecuted Jews. He procured false identity cards for the boys of Nonantola so they could emigrate to Switzerland and offered similar help to many others, including the priest Don Leto Casini and the entire clandestine DELASEM Committee of Florence.

Wrote Don Casini:

"A clandestine typography in Bologna was providing the false I.D. cards which transformed into Italians so many Poles, Russians, Germans, Hungarians etc. I obtained the I.D. format photos and gave them to a young Bologna Jew, who was constantly rushing between myself and the typography. He was a truly exceptionl [sic] messenger... his name was Mario Finzi. After his death, one can say of him what is written on Machiavelli's tomb: Tanto nomini nullum par elogium. There is no adjective which might qualify the nobility, the levature both intellectual and spiritual of his soul. I deem myself truly fortunate in having known him and to have collaborated with him in such a humane endeavour..."

== Arrest and Internment ==
Finzi was arrested on 31 March 1944, whilst going to the local hospital to pay for the stay of a sick Jewish boy. Incarcerated in the Bologna jail of San Giovanni al Monte and subsequently in the Fossoli concentration camp, he was then transported in a sealed railway-car to Auschwitz-Birkenau in May 1944. According to the testimony of a Jew from Rhodes, Eliakim Cordoval, who assisted him, Finzi died because of a grave intestinal infection on 22 February 1945, almost a month after the camp's liberation – another version argues that Finzi threw himself on the high-tension wire that surrounded the camp. He allegedly left behind a message for his parents, asking their forgiveness.

== Recognitions ==
- In 1953 The Municipal Council of Bologna officially named to him the street leading to the Bologna Synagogue.
- In 1960 his contribution the Italian Resistance was recognised and in 1965 the Regional Committee "Prize to the Good" assigned the Golden Star to his memory. Every year, during Remembrance Day (Yom HaShoah), the Jewish Museum of Bologna organises a historico-documentary exhibition to remember him.

== Quote ==
... After his death, one can say of him what is written on Machiavelli's tomb: Tanto nomini nullum par elogium. There is no adjective which might qualify the nobility, the levature both intellectual and spiritual of his soul. I deem myself truly fortunate in having known him and to have collaborated with him in such a humane endeavour...

— Leto Casini

== Bibliography ==
- Fabio Fano (a cura di), Mario Finzi: lettere a un amico, brani musicali, ricordi e testimonianze (Letters to a friend, musical pieces, memories and testimonials) (Alfa: Bologna 1967)
- Renato Peri, Mario Finzi; o, Del buon impiego della propria vita (Barghigiani: Bologna 1995)
