= Raimondo Viale =

- Born: 1907; Limone Piemonte, Cuneo, Italy
- Died: 25 September 1984
- Occupation: Catholic priest

Don Raimondo Viale (1907 – 25 September 1984) was an Italian Catholic priest, whose name is entered among the Righteous Among the Nations at Yad Vashem for his work on behalf of the Jews during the Holocaust.

== Biography ==
Raimondo Viale was born in 1907 in Limone Piemonte, Province of Cuneo. After being ordained a priest, he was assigned to curate in the parish of Borgo San Dalmazzo. In the 1930s, his cultural and social commitments lead him into conflict with the fascist authorities.

Already a victim of intimidation and beatings, in 1940 Viale was arrested and convicted for having delivered a sermon against the entrance into the war against France. He spent 15 months in confinement at Agnone in Molise before he returned to Borgo San Dalmazzo.

On 18 September 1943, he witnessed the arrival of a thousand Jewish refugees from neighbouring France through the Alps. Of the refugees, 349 of them were captured by the German military authorities at Valdieri and confined in a former barracks in Borgo San Dalmazzo, the Borgo San Dalmazzo concentration camp. On the morning of 21 November, the 349 prisoners began their journey to Auschwitz (only nine of them survived). In close touch with Don Francesco Repetto and DELASEM (Delegazione Assistenza Emigranti Ebrei - "Delegation for the Assistance of Jewish Emigrants") of Genoa, Don Viale then dedicated his life to the hundreds of Jews scattered, hiding in the valleys of Cuneo in mountain huts, materially and emotionally assisting them. Don Viale helped Jews reach Genoa where Don Repetto was able to help them escape to Switzerland.

== Honours ==
On 7 August 2000, he received the honour Righteous Among the Nations from the Yad Vashem Institute in Jerusalem.

A square is named after him in Borgo San Dalmazzo.

He was featured as the protagonist in Nuto Revelli’s book The Just Priest.
