= Nathan Cassuto =

Rabbi and Holocaust victim (1909–1945)

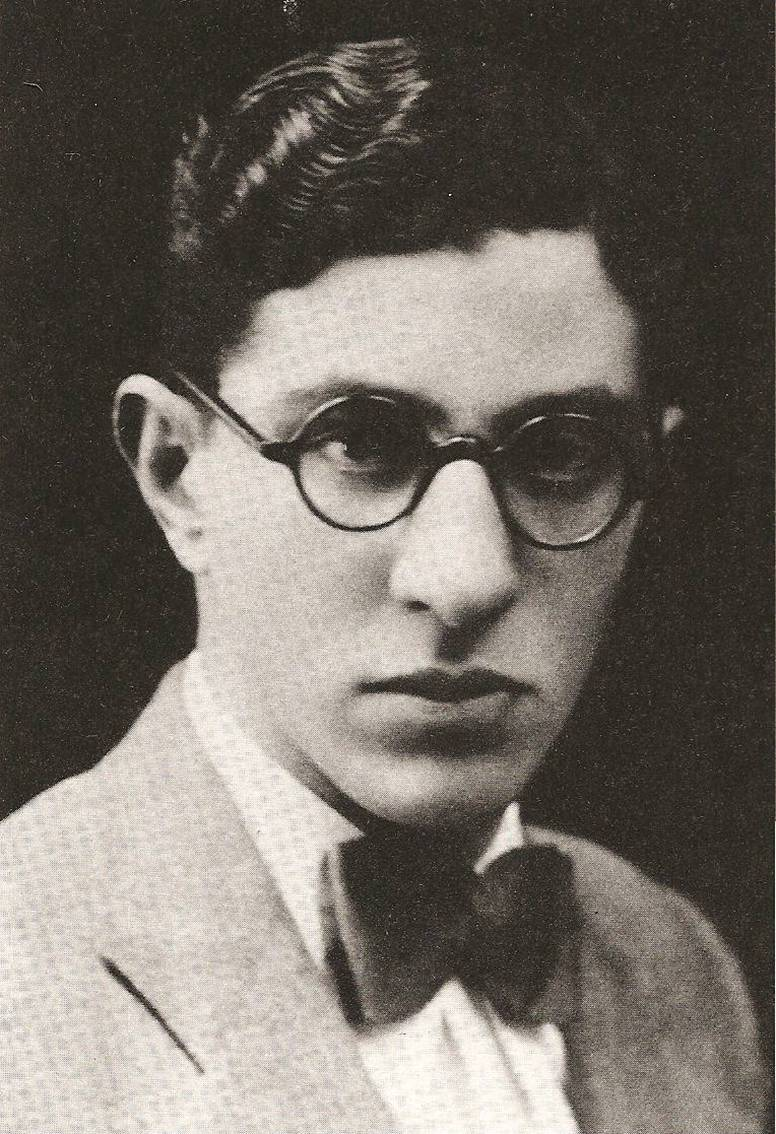
- Born: 11 October 1909; Florence, Italy
- Died: February 1945 (aged 35); Gross-Rosen concentration camp, Nazi Germany
- Spouse: Anna Cassuto
- Children: 3
- Father: Umberto Cassuto

Nathan Cassuto (11 October 1909 – February 1945) was an Italian Jewish ophthalmologist who served in the rabbinate of Milan and was appointed Chief Rabbi of the Jewish community of Florence at the end of 1942.

He was active in the underground resistance and in rescuing members of his community. He was arrested by the Germans, and from January 1945, there are no further records of him. It is believed that he perished during the Death March from the camps to Germany as the Red Army approached. When the Germans invaded northern Italy, Cassuto went from house to house to persuade the Jews to move to hiding places. Afterwards, he, together with others, established a Jewish-Christian underground with the aim of finding shelter for Jewish refugees in church institutions. His efforts saved hundreds of lives before the Nazis began their operations against the Jews of Florence.

== Early life and education ==
Nathan Cassuto was born on 11 October 1909, in Florence, Italy, to Simcha (Bice), née Corcos, and Moshe David Cassuto. His father was a renowned Bible scholar, commentator, and historian. Cassuto studied at the Michelangelo High School in Florence while also attending preparatory courses at the local Rabbinical Seminary. Excelling in his studies, he was awarded honors for being the top student in Florence and the Tuscany region. In 1927, he received the title of Maskil from the Rabbinical Seminary and later completed his studies to earn the title of Hacham Shalem, equivalent to rabbinic ordination in Ashkenazi Jewish tradition. In 1933, he graduated from the University of Florence with a medical degree and, by 1937, had specialized in ophthalmology.

== Medical and academic career ==
Cassuto served as a military physician after completing his studies. His career included medical research, teaching, and clinical practice. He published several medical papers, and in 1938, he was awarded a scholarship to study at the Rockefeller Institute in New York. However, due to the racial laws enacted in Italy that year, the fascist regime denied him a passport, preventing him from traveling to the United States.

During his academic years he dedicated time to contribute to a Jewish-Italian youth magazine called Israel for Youth, writing a column titled "Tell Me, Mother", where he answered children's questions about Judaism under the pseudonym "Rabbi Nathan".

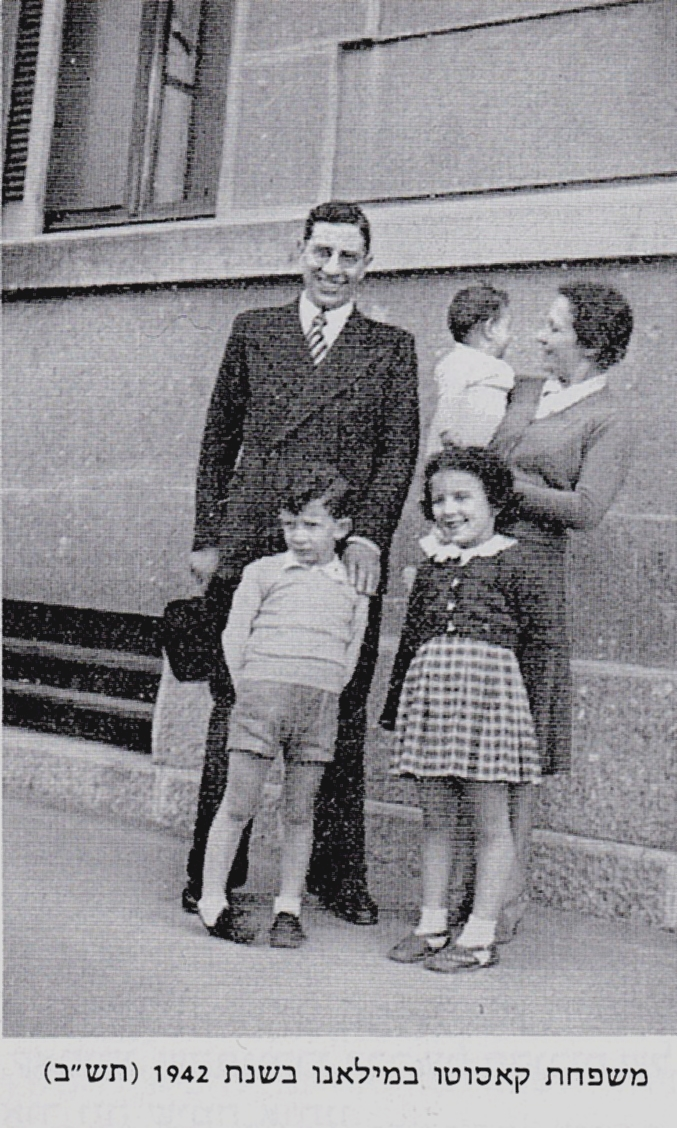
The Cassuto family in Milan, 1942

When Italy's racial laws were enacted, Cassuto was barred from working in public medical institutions. However, he was allowed to observe surgeries as a spectator to maintain his skills. His director at the clinic, Professor Bardelli, once defied the racial laws by calling Cassuto to assist in a critical operation, saying, "To hell with the racial laws—Cassuto, come help me!" Cassuto was also a highly sought-after mohel, a ritual circumciser, as he was both a rabbi and a physician.

== World War II and the Jewish underground in Florence ==
Cassuto played a crucial role in Jewish education in Milan, teaching Hebrew, Jewish history, and biblical studies at the Jewish high school on Via Eupili. He also provided free medical services to the Jewish community and worked to instill Zionist values in the youth, preparing them for pioneering settlement in Palestine.

On 14 February 1943, Cassuto delivered his inaugural sermon at the Great Synagogue of Florence. Aware of the increasing danger, he urged the congregation to dedicate themselves to Torah study, uphold Jewish traditions, and remain strong in faith. His lectures covered both general topics like science and faith, and specific Jewish subjects such as dietary laws and biblical archaeology.

When the Germans occupied Florence in September 1943, Cassuto took immediate action to warn and protect the Jewish community. His sister, Hulda Campagnano, later testified at the Adolf Eichmann's trial in Jerusalem.

My brother went from house to house warning Jews and urging them to hide in monasteries and small villages under assumed identities.

— Hulda Campagnano

His warnings saved hundreds of lives before the Nazis began their brutal operations against the Jews of Florence.

== Arrest and deportation to Auschwitz ==
A salvation underground group was created, the idea was to seek help from Church authorities. A meeting was arranged between Matilde Cassin, Rabbi Nathan Cassuto and the head of the Catholic Church in Florence, Cardinal Elia Dalla Costa. Following this meeting, a joint Jewish-Christian underground was established, involving two priests—Father Cipriano Ricotti and Don Leto Casini. Their mission was to locate monasteries in the Florence area willing to shelter Jewish refugees. On 26 November 1943, Nazi forces raided the underground meeting place in Florence. Cassuto was arrested along with all the other attendees (Matilde was saved because she was late to that meeting). Their arrest resulted from a betrayal by Marco Ischia, an Italian working for a wealthy Polish-Jewish refugee that joined the group.

Ischia also deceived Anna Cassuto, who was hiding with their children and her parents in the monastery of "San Giovanni Battista della Calza". He lured her to Piazza della Signoria under the pretext of providing information about her husband's whereabouts. When she arrived, she was ambushed and arrested along with her brother-in-law and Raffaele Cantoni. During two months of Nazi interrogations, she concealed her identity to protect her family. However, on the night before Nathan Cassuto was deported, she revealed her identity, hoping to be sent with him. On 30 January 1944, Nathan and Anna Cassuto were deported from Milan's San Vittore Prison to Auschwitz concentration camp, along with 700 other prisoners, 180 of which were from Tuscany. Of the 700, only 97 men and 31 women survived the initial selection. In the end, only 13 men and 8 women from that transport survived the war. Anna Cassuto was among the eight women who lived.

At Auschwitz, Nathan Cassuto was assigned to the men's barracks and worked as a physician. He managed to receive a brief message from his wife, confirming that she was still alive.

== Death and legacy ==
In January 1945, as the Soviet Red Army approached Auschwitz, the Nazis forced thousands of prisoners on a death march to Gross-Rosen concentration camp (now Rogoźnica, Lower Silesian Voivodeship, Poland). Cassuto was among them. Cassuto is presumed to have died in mid-February 1945. A fellow inmate later recalled:

I had the honor of earning Nathan Cassuto's friendship. Thanks to him, I experienced moments of peace and solace amid the hell.

Cassuto's children were hidden separately with non-Jewish families. His son Daniel stayed with Mario and Lina Santerini, while David was sheltered by Ezio and Anna Calzi.

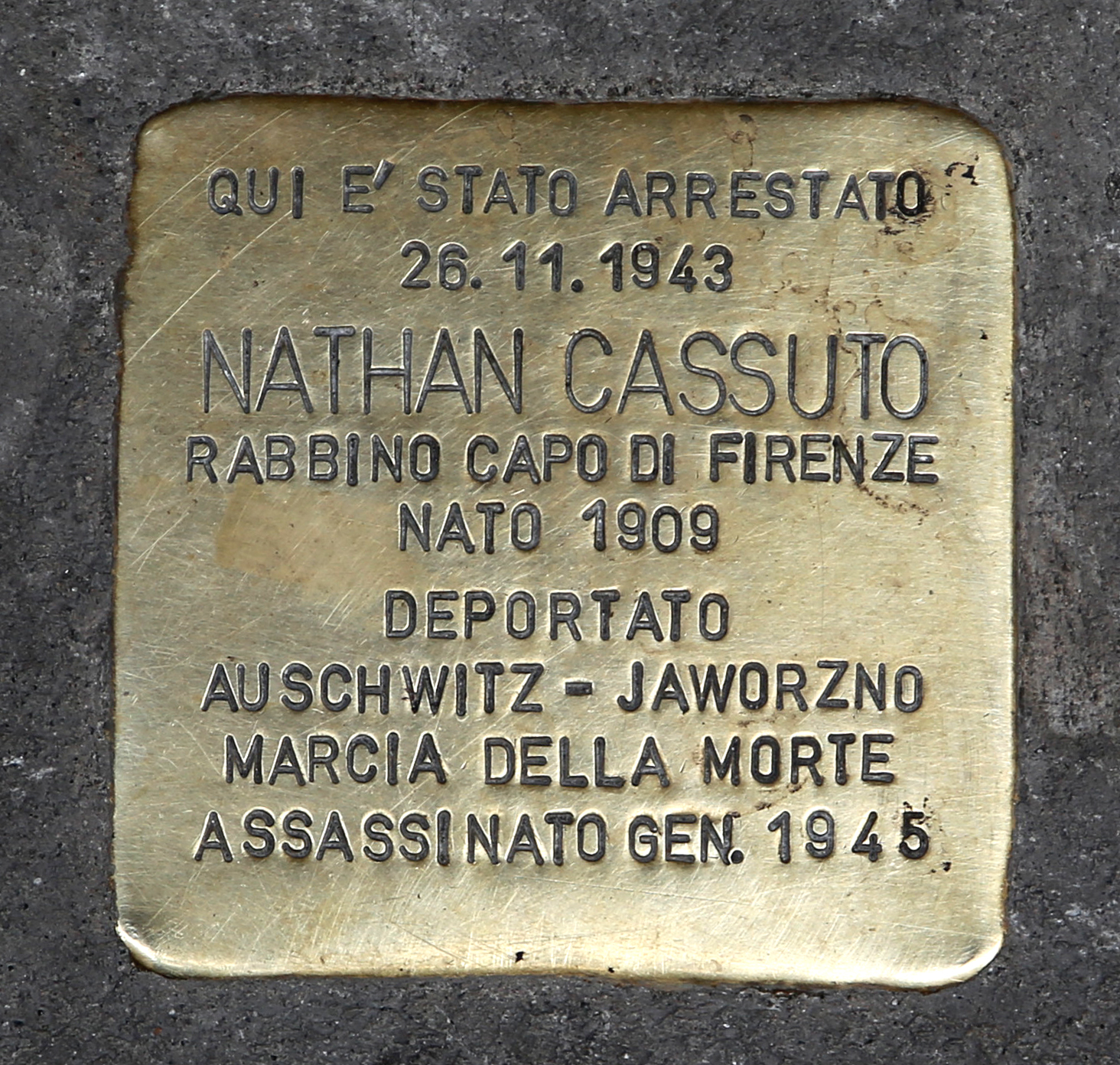
A memorial plaque at the site of Rabbi Cassuto's arrest on Via Pucci

The entire family survived the war.

In March 1945, the surviving members of the Cassuto family immigrated to Palestine aboard the Princess Kathleen. They had no knowledge of Anna's fate at the time, but she too survived and eventually joined them. She later worked in a laboratory at Hadassah Mount Scopus Hospital in Jerusalem. On 13 April 1948, she was killed in the Hadassah Convoy Massacre. Nathan Cassuto's name was later commemorated on a memorial plaque at the Great Synagogue of Florence, alongside two other local Jews who perished in 1948 Arab–Israeli War.
