= Carlo Minoretti =

Italian Cardinal of the Roman Catholic Church

His Eminence Carlo Dalmazio Minoretti
- Archbishop of Genoa
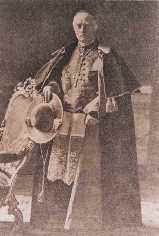
- Church: Roman Catholic Church
- Archdiocese: Genoa
- See: Genoa
- Appointed: 16 January 1925
- Installed: 22 April 1925
- Term ended: 13 March 1938
- Predecessor: Francesco Sidoli
- Successor: Pietro Boetto
- Other post: Cardinal-Priest of Sant'Eusebio (1929-38)
- Previous posts: Bishop of Crema (1915-25); Apostolic Administrator of Crema (1925-26)

Orders
- Ordination: 22 December 1883 by Luigi Nazari di Calabiana
- Consecration: 16 January 1916 by Andrea Carlo Ferrari
- Created cardinal: 16 December 1929 by Pope Pius XI

Personal details
- Born: Carlo Dalmazio Minoretti; 17 September 1861 Cogliate, Kingdom of Italy
- Died: 13 March 1938 (aged 76) Genoa, Kingdom of Italy
- Motto: Per Jesum ad Mariam
- Coat of arms

Carlo Dalmazio Minoretti (17 September 1861 – 13 March 1938) was a Cardinal of the Roman Catholic Church who served as Archbishop of Genoa.

== Early life and education ==
Carlo Minoretti was born in Cogliate, Lombardy. He was educated at the Seminary of Milan. Ordained priest in 1884, he served as a faculty member of Seminary of Monza from 1890 until 1907, when he became a faculty member of the Seminary of Milan until 1909. He did pastoral work in the Archdiocese of Milan until 1915.

== Episcopate ==
Pope Benedict XV appointed him Bishop of Crema on 6 December 1915. He was consecrated on 16 January 1916 by Andrea Ferrari, Cardinal Archbishop of Milan. Pope Pius XI promoted him to the metropolitan see of Genoa on 16 January 1925.

== Cardinalate ==
Pope Pius XI created him Cardinal-Priest of Sant'Eusebio in the consistory of 16 December 1929. He died in 1938 in Genoa in office.

Catholic Church titles
Preceded by Bernardo Pizzorno	Bishop of Crema; 6 December 1915 – 16 January 1925	Succeeded by Giacomo Montanelli
Preceded by Francesco Sidoli	Archbishop of Genoa; 16 January 1925 – 13 March 1938	Succeeded by Pietro Boetto
