= Père Marie-Benoît =

French Righteous Among the Nations (1895–1990)

Marie-Benoît Péteul, O.F.M. Cap.
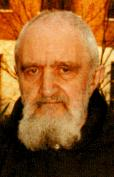
- Born: Pierre Péteul; 3 March 1895; Bourg d'Iré, France
- Died: 5 February 1990 (aged 94)
- Church: Roman Catholic Church; Order of Friars Minor Capuchin

Père Marie-Benoît (Anglicized, Father Mary Benedict; in Italian, known as Padre Maria Benedetto; 3 March 1895 – 5 February 1990) was born Pierre Péteul. As a Capuchin Franciscan friar he helped smuggle approximately 4,000 Jews into safety from Nazi-occupied Southern France. On 1 December 1966, he was honored with the Medal of the Righteous among the Nations for his courage and self-sacrifice. His actions to save Jews during the Holocaust were the reason for his epithet Father of the Jews (French: Père des juifs).

== Life before World War II ==
Born Pierre Péteul, Father Marie-Benoît served in World War I in North Africa, and was wounded at Verdun. He received the distinction of five citations and the Croix de Guerre. After the war he joined the Franciscan Capuchin Order and earned a doctorate in theology at Rome. In 1940 he returned to France and became a priest stationed in Marseille.

== Actions in wartime ==
=== In Marseille ===
In Marseille in 1940, he found thousands of refugees trying to escape the horrors of World War II. He was determined to help them because, in his own words,

We Christians claim to be spiritual children of the patriarch Abraham. This should be enough reason to exclude any kind of anti-Semitism whatsoever, anti-Semitism being an ideology which we Christians cannot in any way share and be part of.

Father Marie-Benoît's operation focused on finding ways to successfully smuggle Jews out of an increasingly hostile France. Marie-Benoît transformed the Capuchin monastery in Marseille, at 51 Rue de la Croix de Régnier, into his first headquarters. There he organized a massive forging operation, installing and improvising printing facilities to create fake passports, baptism certificates, and other documents that aided hundreds of refugees in crossing the border to Spain and Switzerland. This was often done with the collaboration of Jewish organizations and members of the French resistance.

In November 1942, the Nazis had occupied France's Free Zone, which included Marseille. This precluded the option of helping Jews escape to Switzerland and Spain. Accordingly, Father Benoît turned his attention to the Riviera and Haute-Savoie, occupied by the Italians.

=== In Nice ===
Traveling to Nice, he persuaded Italian officials to permit Jews to cross into the Italian zone. Specifically, he met with Guido Lospinoso, the Italian commissioner of Jewish affairs, whom Mussolini had sent at the Germans' insistence. Father Benoît persuaded Lospinoso to refrain from action against the 30,000 Jews who lived in the vicinity of Nice.

Also in Nice, Father Benoît met Angelo Donati, a Jewish banker and director of the French-Italian Bank of Credit. Donati had a plan to transport over the Italien Jews to North Africa by boat. However, in order to approach the Italian authorities, he needed the cooperation of the Holy See.

=== In Rome ===
In July 1943, Father Benoît traveled to Rome to seek the help of Pope Pius XII in transferring Jews to northern Africa. A meeting was arranged between Father Benoît and the pope. When Father Benoit explained that the police in Vichy France were acting against the Jews, Pius XII was surprised, saying, "Who could ever expect this from noble France?" He promised to diligently deal with the situation. However, the North African plan was eventually foiled when the Germans occupied northern Italy and the Italian-occupied zone of France.

Father Marie-Benoît returned briefly to France in order to carry out "the Spanish part of his plan". With authority from the Spanish government of Francisco Franco to decide which French Jews qualified as being of Spanish descent, he managed to save another 2,600 people; there is no record of how many of them actually had any Spanish blood.

Upon the urging of his friends, Father Marie-Benoît disappeared from France and resurfaced in Rome as Padre Benedetti. One of his hiding places was commemorated by the International Raoul Wallenberg Foundation, a non-governmental organization which researches Holocaust rescuers and advocates for their recognition.

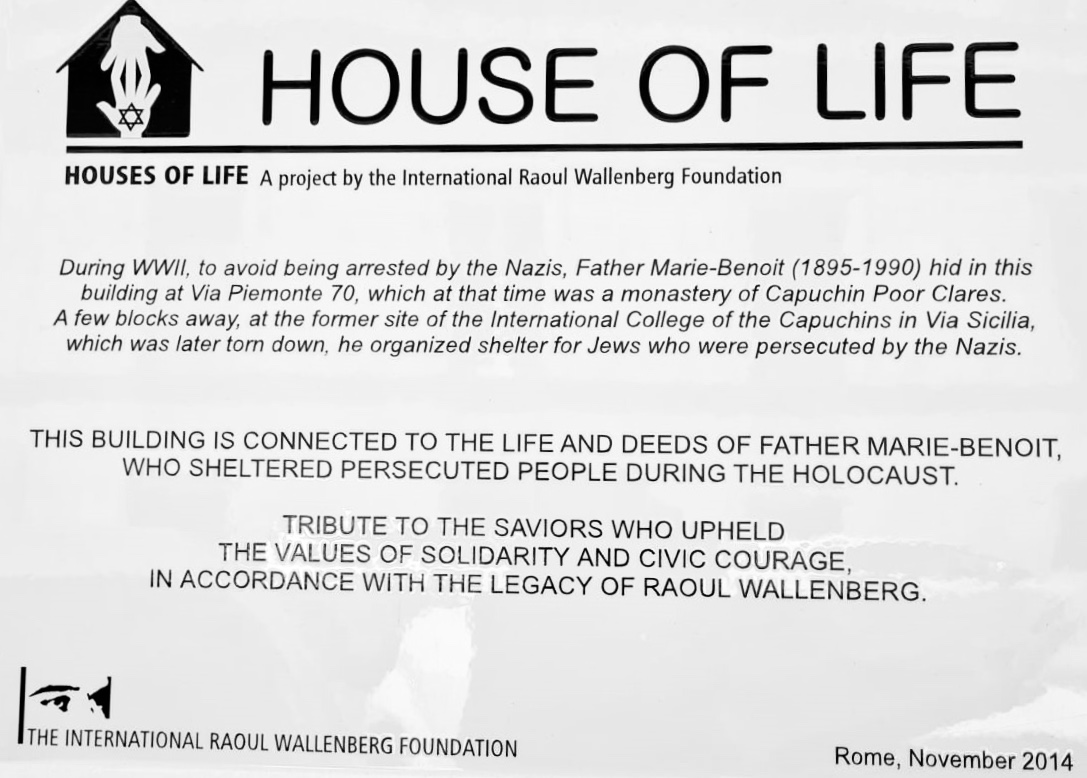

He was elected to the board of DELASEM (Delegazione Assistenza Emigranti Ebrei: "Delegation for the Assistance of Jewish Emigrants"), the central Jewish welfare organization in Italy of which he eventually became president.

Marie-Benoît transferred the DELASEM headquarters to the International College of the Capuchins, and inaugurated an operation to forge documents there. His office was raided several times by the Gestapo, early in 1945, with the arrest, torture, and execution of most of the rest of the DELASEM leadership, Father Benoît was persuaded to go into hiding. Against everyone's expectations, he actually survived the war.

== Recognition ==
When Rome was liberated in June 1944, the Jewish community—led by Rabbi Israel Zoller—held an official synagogue ceremony in honor of Father Benoît, "shower[ing] him with praise." Years later, U.S. President Lyndon Johnson delivered a speech in which he said that Father Benoît's "wonderful actions" should "inspire the American people in the protection and preservation of the rights of citizens, irrespective of race, color or religion."

On 1 December 1966, Yad Vashem officially recognized Father Benoit as a Righteous Among the Nations. Overall, he helped thousands of Jews to reach Switzerland and Spain from the South of France, or escape by other means. Even while pursued by the Gestapo, he escaped to Rome, where he continued his efforts for the Jews.
