= Raffaele Cantoni =

Raffaele Cantoni

Raffaele Cantoni (1896–1971) was an anti-fascist Italian Jew who is best known for his efforts, perhaps daring, in saving Italian Jews from the Holocaust.

He was a DELASEM executive before and during the German occupation of World War II. He was also President of the pro-Zionist UCEI (Unione delle Comunità Ebraiche Italiane) or Union of Italian Jewish Communities. He was a Mason and a socialist.

== Background ==
Cantoni was born in Venice and studied economics, becoming a counselor to the Banca Nazionale del Lavoro and president of the Fiduciaria. He participated heroically in World War I and took part in the conquest of Fiume, led by Gabriele D'Annunzio. "L' impresa di Fiume" was an incident where a 2,600 rebel army - the Grenadiers of Sardinia - from Ronchi Valsugana (then called the Ronchi dei Legionari), at Monfalcone marched to Fiume. Fiume (Rijeka in Croatian) and the city Kvarner (Carnaro) was then annexed to the Kingdom of Italy.

== Activist ==
He took up socialist ideals, and espoused a critical attitude towards the fascist regime, and was referred to the Special Court. For his participation in antifascist actions he was arrested in 1930 with other opponents of the regime like Riccardo Bauer and Ferruccio Parri. In 1933 he became a leader of the Comitato Assistenza Ebrei Italiani (Committee for Assistance of Italian Jews) of DELASEM (Delegation for the Assistance of Emigrants) and other Jewish relief institutions. The racial laws of 1938 caused a riff between the new leadership of the UCEI (Dante Almansi and Lelio Vittorio Valobra) and the Antifascist Jewish components. He was connected with the American Jewish Joint Distribution Committee and the World Jewish Congress; he founded many Italian hakhsharot. A fervent Zionist, in early 1939 Cantoni also tried unsuccessfully to persuade the British ambassador in Rome to accept a plan for the enrollment of Jewish volunteers in their army, that plan would be realized only in the last years of World War II with the creation of the Jewish Brigade.

== Resistance ==
During World War II he strongly and continuously assisted Italian and European Jews; he was arrested by the Fascists in 1940 and interned in Urbisaglia (a town near Macerata) and in the Tremiti Islands, but he continued his activities. He resumed contact with the headquarters of the Genoese DELASEM and was employed as a courier in Tuscany for the distribution of funds in collaboration with Fathers Leto Casini and Giorgio Nissim. In 1943 he was betrayed and captured in Florence by the Nazis and sent to Auschwitz, but during the journey he jumped from the train near Padua and saved himself. He escaped to Switzerland and there began to reorganize the life of Italian Jews, establishing Jewish schools and various activities with the Milanese Astorre Mayer.

After the war he continued his involvement in the Italian Socialist Party and the Jewish organizations in Milan. After the liberation in 1945 he assumed the position of president of the Jewish community of Milan and was an active member of the CLNAI (Committee for National Liberation of North Italy). He was also the Italian leader of the OSE (Oeuvre de Secours aux Enfants). While organizing Jewish life in Milan, he was also a strong supporter the Aliyah Bet (illegal immigration to Israel), raising substantial funds. Recognizing the critical need to care for Jewish orphans, liberated from concentration camps, who were then drifting into northern Italy, he was instrumental in transforming a former fascist boarding school at Selvino, in the Italian Alps near Milan, into a home to rehabilitate around 800 of these children and to prepare them for emigration to Palestine. Cantoni also held posts in the Italian Zionist Federation and in the Keren Hayesod. He was an executive member of the World Jewish Congress.

== Post-War Involvement ==
From 1946 to 1954 Cantoni was president of the Union of Italian Jewish Communities and worked to obtain from the Italian government freedom of Jewish worship equal to that of the Catholics, without complete success. He was also president of the Organizzazione Sanitaria Ebraica (Jewish Health Organization) from the inception of its activities in Italy. Until his death, he spared no effort to maintain relations between the Jews of the Diaspora and Israel and to establish diplomatic relations between Israel and other countries.

A foundation, the Israele la Fondazione per la Gioventù Ebraica Raffaele Cantoni (Raffaele Cantoni Foundation for Jewish youth in Israel), has been set up in his name. The Foundation offers annual scholarships to young Jewish immigrants arriving from Italy and who intend to enroll in universities, yeshivot, or other institutes for advanced learning.
