= Selvino children =

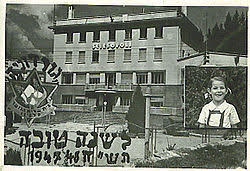
The Sciesopoli building

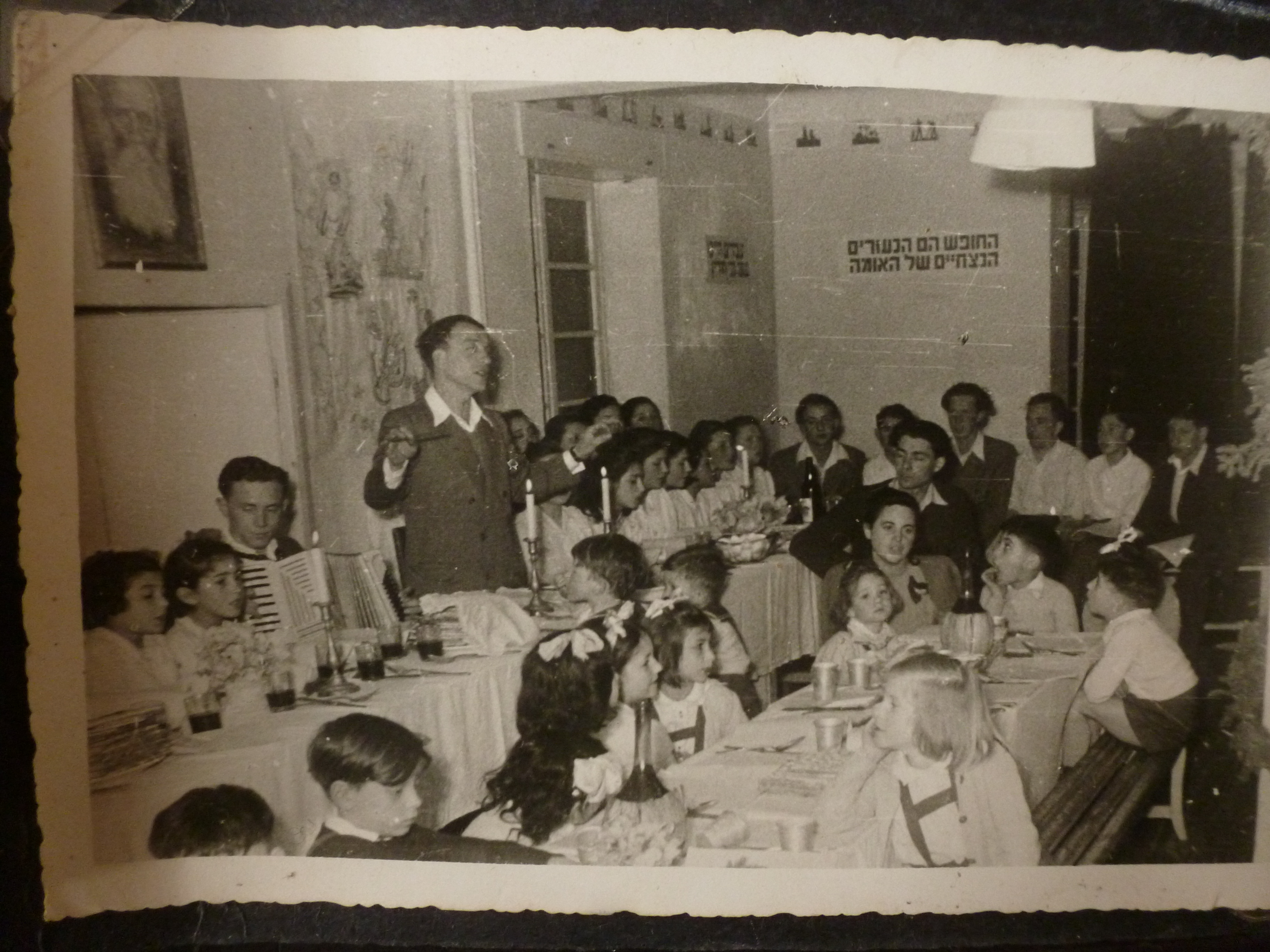
Passover Eve at the Sciesopoli House

The Selvino children were a group of approximately 810 Jewish children orphaned by the Holocaust, rescued after World War II from ghettos and concentration camps and housed in a former Fascist children's home called Sciesopoli in the Alpine town of Selvino, Italy. The facility had been constructed in the 1930s (the colony was inaugurated on June 11, 1933, built by the architect of sports facilities Paolo Vietti Violi) as a "sports palace" or gymnasium and training centre for athletes. There, the children were allowed to recover physically, mentally, and spiritually from their ordeal, while being instructed both in the general education they had missed during their imprisonment, as well as in their heritage of Judaism and Judaic culture, in preparation for their later relocation to the still British-ruled Mandatory Palestine as part of the Bricha immigration programme. The house was run by members of the Jewish Brigade, a Palestinian Jewish unit of the British Army stationed in Northern Italy under Moshe Zeiri, along with the generous help of many Italian citizens. From early 1947 to May 1948, when the State of Israel was declared, Amalia (Mania) Schoeps was director of Sciesopoli.

The house was organized by members of the Gordonia movement, a Zionist pioneering youth movement named for Aaron David Gordon. Its motto was Beit Aliyat HaNo'ar, "house of the youth aliya", where aliya means "ascension" [to the Land of Israel], i.e. moving to the Land of Israel. It was a Hakshara — a kibbutz outside of (then) Palestine for the training of chaluzim or young pioneers to move to the Land of Israel, a Zionist collective which emphasized a preparatory program of studying and working before making aliya.

At that time, many residents of Selvino gave shelter and extended hospitality to Jewish families, which was documented in the City Hall of Selvino. After 1948, Sciesopoli was transformed into a home for needy and sick children, as well as a public school for these children.

In 1983, a group of 66 Jews, once refugee children in Selvino, returned to town. The Mayor, Vinicio Grigis, and town residents received them warmly. The city of Selvino was twinned with Kibbutz Tze'elim in the Negev, where many "Children of Selvino" settled. Since 1983, many survivors and their family members have returned to Selvino, tracing their past of the Bricha (flight) and Aliyah Bet.

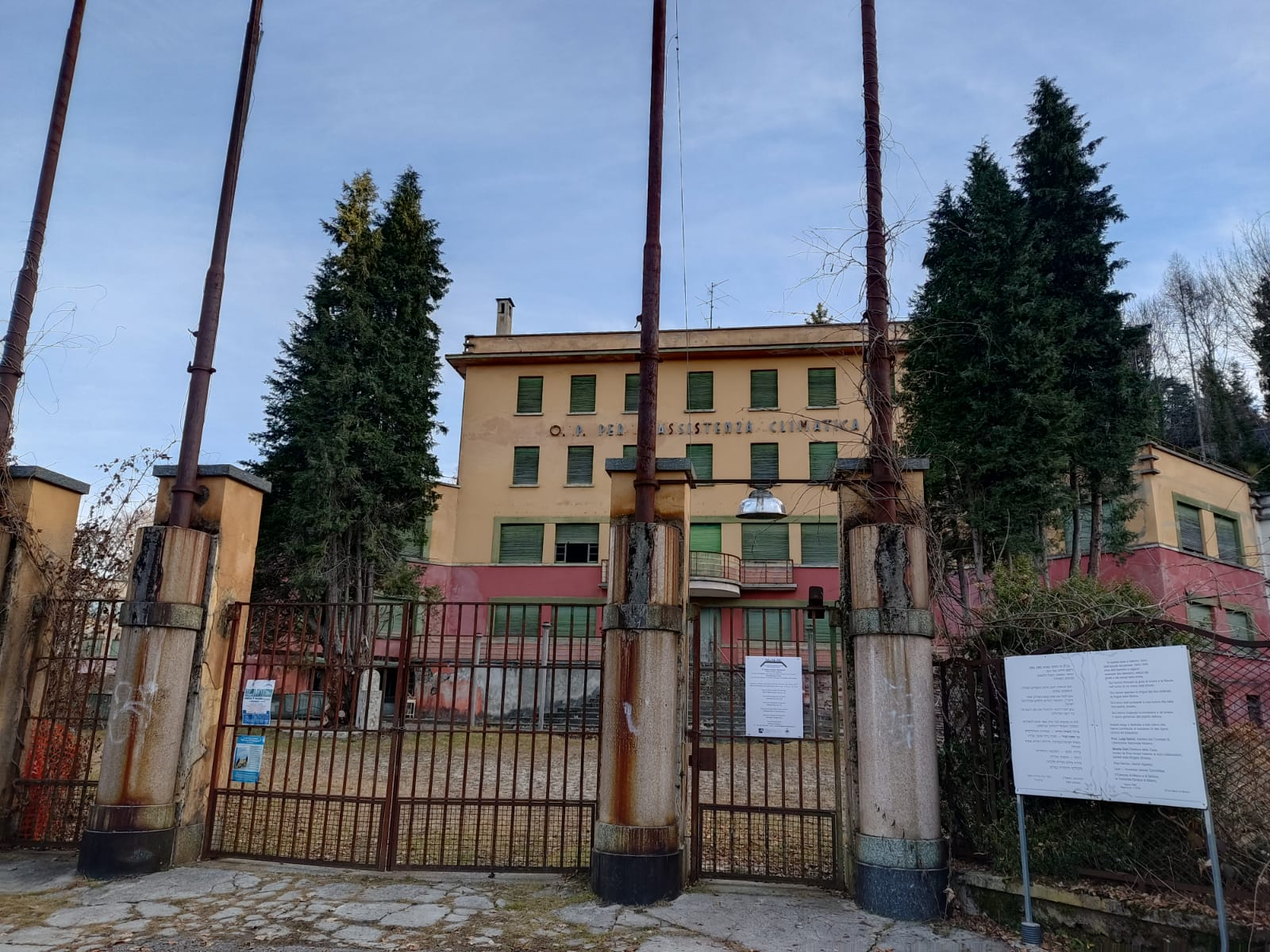
Main building at Sciesopoli in 2022, with plaque in context

A plaque (see images) was installed in 1983, reading:

Between the years 1945–1948, nearly 800 children and youths – Holocaust orphans – were gathered in this house. They were survivors of the ghettos and concentration camps. Here the joys of youth and the belief in mankind, that was snatched from them, were restored to them. They learned their people's ancient tongue – the language of the Bible, and were prepared for life in their homeland – Israel. Here they learned to recognize and cherish the goodness of the Italian people.

The building is now in a state of complete abandonment, despite the efforts of the former mayor to allocate funds to publish in Italian the book written by Aharon Megged, and the twinning of the city with Kibbutz Tze'elim. Plans to demolish the building alarmed a group of activists who fear that a heroic chapter of history following the war will be erased from the memory of future generations. They believe that part of the building should be secured as a memorial/museum to honor the lives of orphan children survivors of the Holocaust, as well as honoring committed, well-wishing Italian citizens of Selvino.

As of 2014–2015 a movement to "restore and save Sciesopoli" has been established. As part of this, Miriam Bisk, Tami Sharon, Nitza Sarner, Marco Cavallarin, Enrico Grisanti, Bernardino Pasinelli and many other members of the organizing committee have collected signatures to lobby the Italian government.

== Images ==

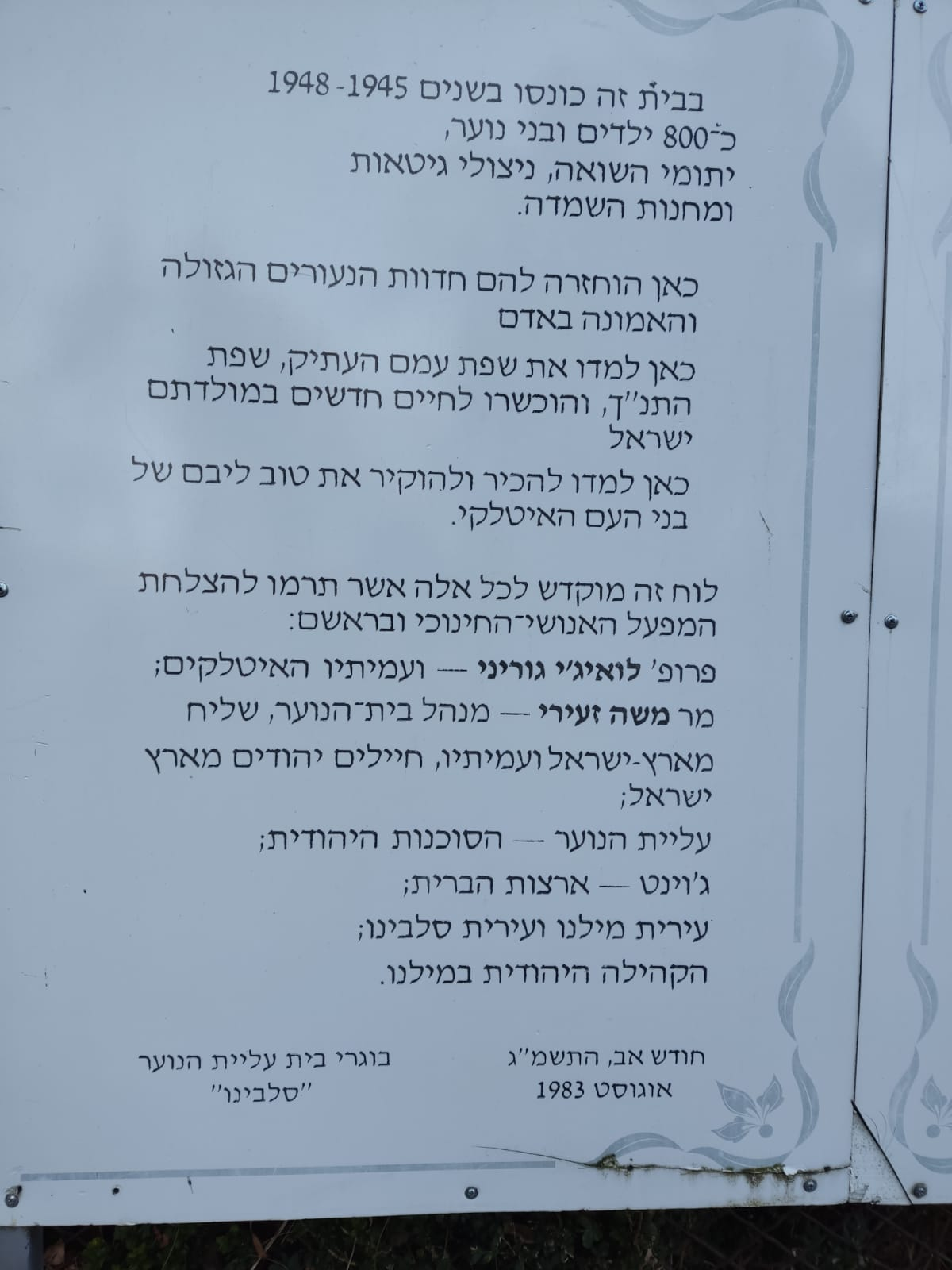

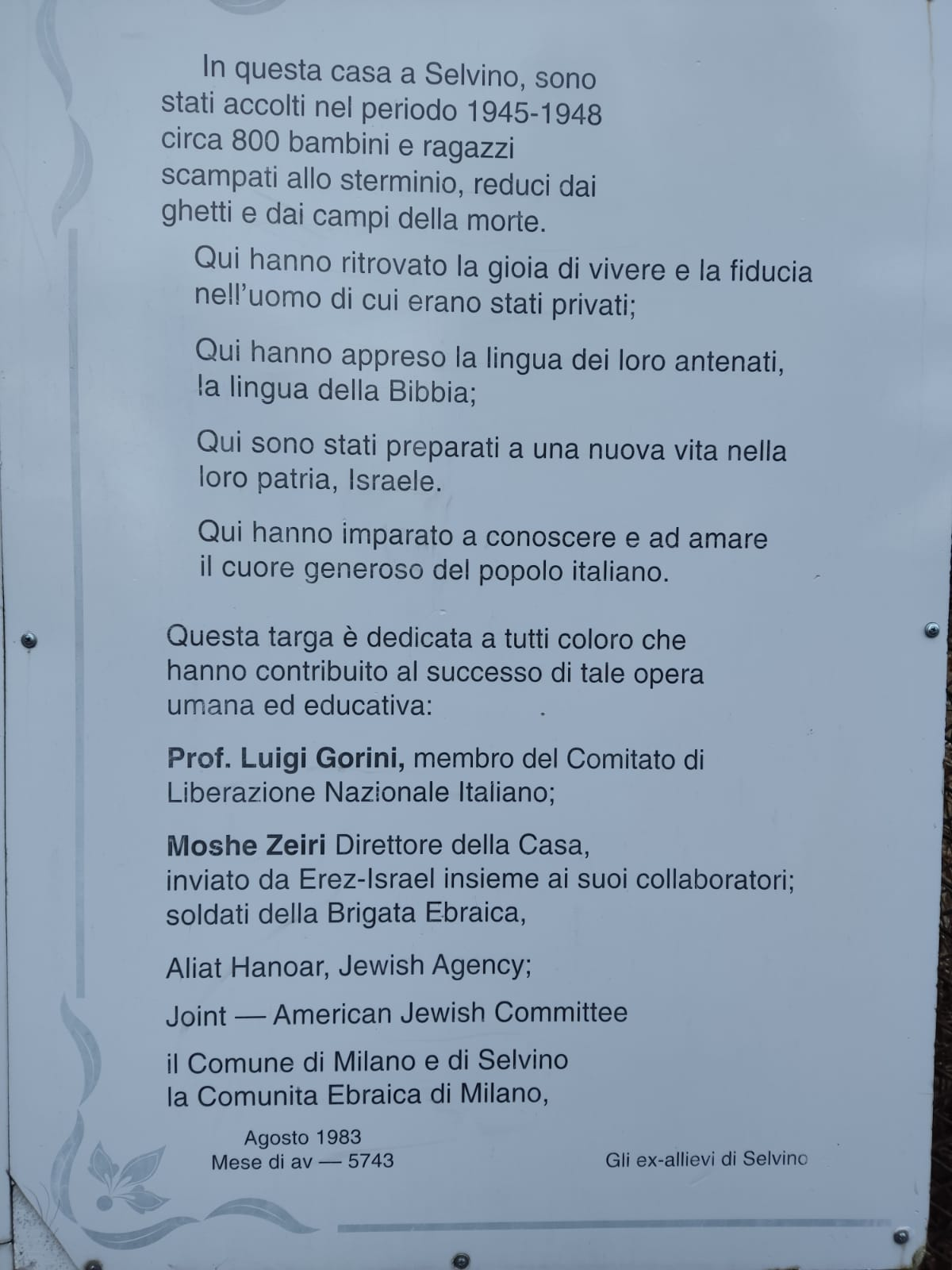
