= Nonantola =

- Comune
- Comune di Nonantola
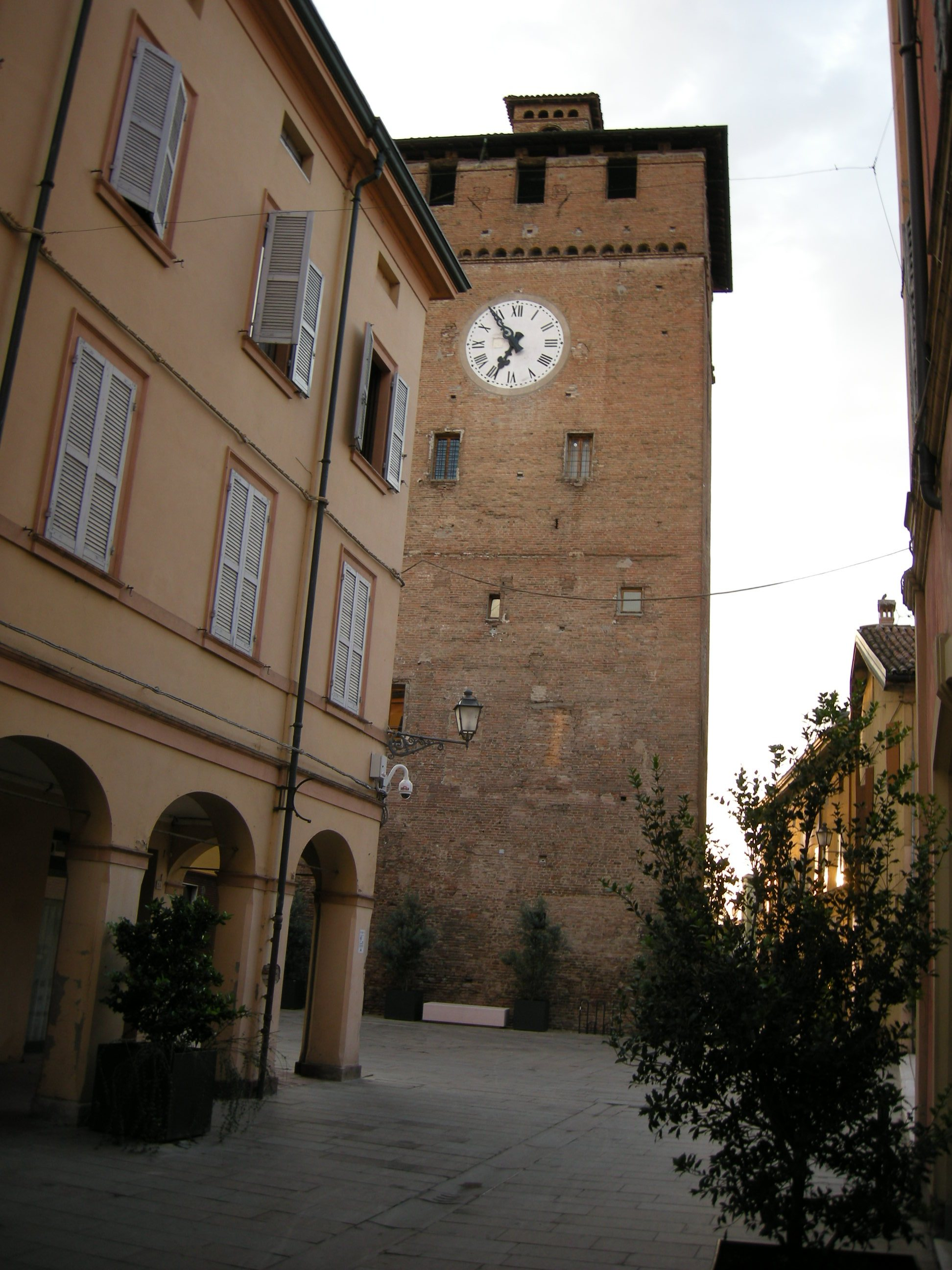
- Modenesi tower in town centre

- Coat of arms

- Location within Italy Location within Emilia-Romagna
- Coordinates: 44°40′41″N 11°02′32″E
- Country: Italy
- Region: Emilia-Romagna
- Province: Modena (MO)
- Frazioni: La Grande, Casette, Campazzo, Bagazzano, Rubbiara, Redù, Via Larga

Government
  - Mayor: Tiziana Baccolini

Area
  - Total: 55.32 km^{2} (21.36 sq mi)
- Elevation: 20 m (66 ft)

Population (30 November 2017)
  - Total: 15,921
  - Density: 287.8/km^{2} (745.4/sq mi)
- Demonym: Nonantolani
- Time zone: UTC+1 (CET)
  - Summer (DST): UTC+2 (CEST)
- Postal code: 41015
- Dialing code: 059
- Patron saint: St. Sylvester
- Saint day: December 31
- Website: Official website

Nonantola (Modenese: Nunântla) is a town and comune in the province of Modena in the Emilia-Romagna region of northern Italy. It is in the Po Valley about 10 kilometres (6 mi) from Modena on the road to Ferrara.

== History ==
In ancient times the territory of Nonantola was inhabited by the Celtic tribes, more specifically by the Boii. After the Roman conquest of Northern Italy (Cisalpine Gaul) the Boii were subjugated, and as a result they started to slowly speak Latin, giving rise to the local Gallo-Romance language, a variety of Gallo-Italic languages. Nonantola's history is strongly connected to the Benedictine monastery founded by the Lombards. Its creation in 752 totally supplanted the old Roman past and was the premise of Nonantola's High Middle Ages importance, as it was chosen for the meeting in 883 between Pope Marinus I and the emperor Charles the Fat. Pope Hadrian III was buried here.

In the year 890 the town and the monastery were devastated by Hungarian marauders.

Nonantola was disputed between Modena and Bologna until it fell under Este's suzerainty (as an autonomous commune) in 1412. A constitution was issued in 1419. Nonantola remained a pacific agricultural centre well into the 17th century, when it had several urbanistic renovations.

In the Napoleonic Wars the abbey lost all its territories, which were acquired by the count Leonardo Salimbeni. In 1898 his palace, which once belonged to the monastery, was sold to the comune of Nonantola, becoming the Town Hall. In this age the agriculture started dying out, as the Modenese nobles used archaic methods of cultivation, and industries, trade and water were lacking.

During the German occupation in World War II the Nonantolani hosted 73 Jewish children, enabling them to flee to Switzerland. The city was awarded a Cross of War Medal for Military Valour for this feat and for its contribution to the Italian resistance movement.

Today Nonantola is an increasingly important cultural and tourist resort.

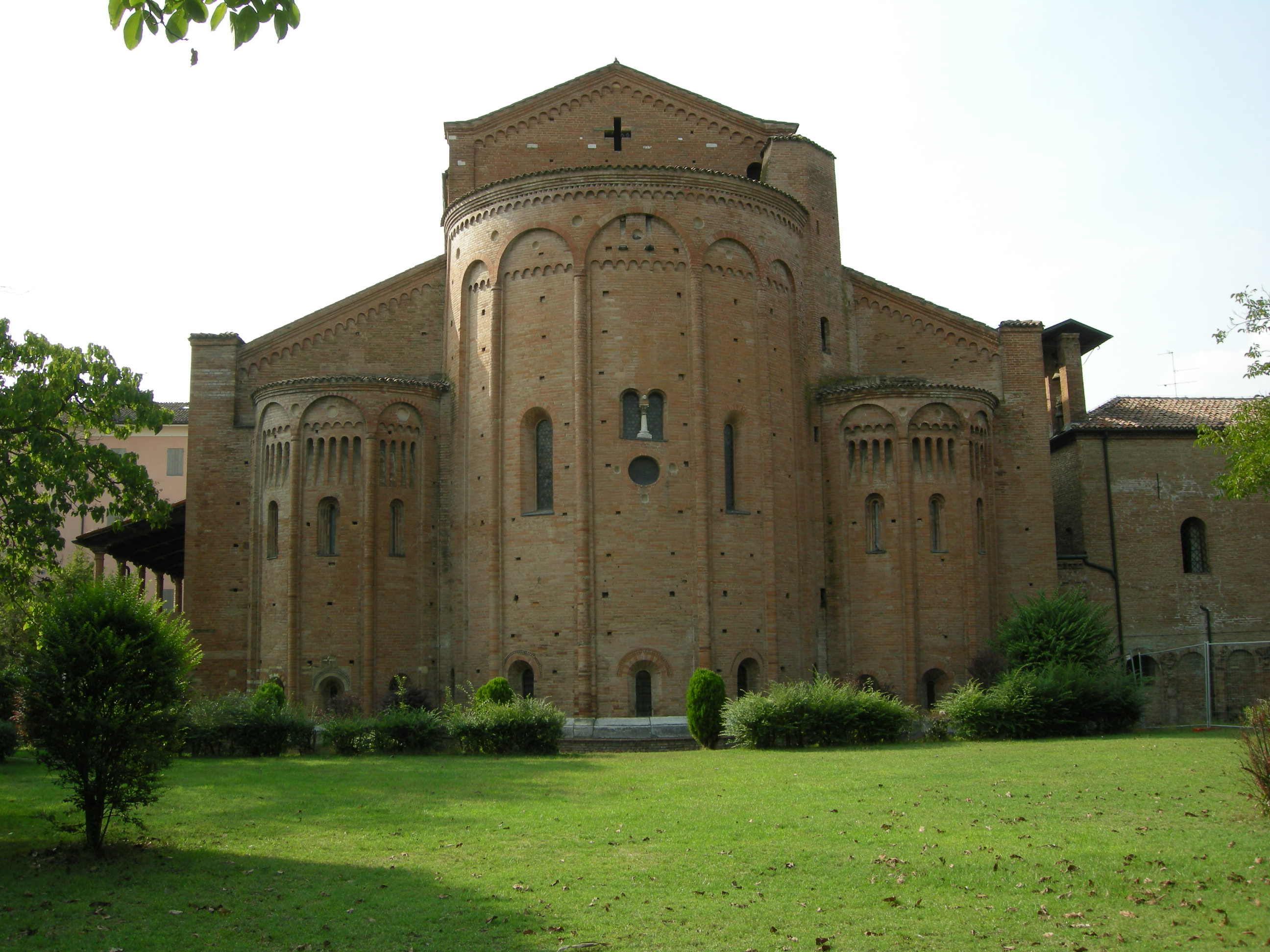
East end of Nonantola abbey

=== Abbey ===
Nonantola Abbey a Benedictine monastery, was founded in 752 by the Lombard duke of Friuli, St. Anselm. It was richly endowed by King Aistulph, but of the older edifices only traces remain. Pope Stephen II appointed Anselm its first abbot, and presented the relics of St. Sylvester to the abbey, named in consequence S. Sylvester de Nonantula. After the death of Aistulph (756), Anselm was banished to Monte Cassino by the new king, Desiderius, but was restored by Charlemagne after seven years.

Up to 1083 it was an imperial monastery, and its discipline often suffered severely on account of imperial interference in the election of abbots. In the beginning of the Conflict of Investitures it sided with the emperor, until forced to submit to the pope by Matilda of Canossa in 1083. It finally declared itself openly for the pope in 1111 when Placidus of Nonantola wrote his De honore Ecclesiæ, a defence of the papal position during the Conflict of Investitures.

From the 13th century onwards the monastery decayed badly; the final decline began in 1419, when it came under the jurisdiction of commendatory abbots. In 1514 the abbey came into the possession of the Cistercians, but continued to decline until it was finally suppressed by Clement XIII in 1768.

On 23 January 1821 Pius VII restored the monastery, with the provision that its prelature nullius should belong to the Archbishopric of Modena.

== Main sights ==
Nonantola contains several remains from the Middle Ages. These include the two towers called dei Modenesi and dei Bolognesi, and the Pieve of S. Michael Archangel (9th century).

The main monument, however, is the renowned abbey of San Sylvester Romanesque basilica, erected from the 8th century onwards. In the years 1913–17 it was restored to its original early 12th-century condition.
