= Pietro Boetto =

Italian Cardinal

His Eminence Pietro Boetto S.J.
- Cardinal; Archbishop of Genoa
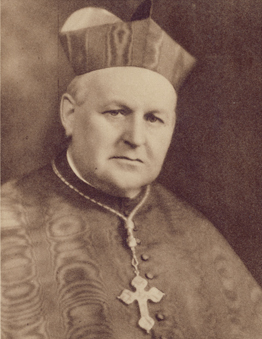
- Church: Roman Catholic Church
- Archdiocese: Genoa
- See: Genoa
- Appointed: 17 March 1938
- Installed: 3 May 1938
- Term ended: 31 January 1946
- Predecessor: Carlo Dalmazio Minoretti
- Successor: Giuseppe Siri
- Other post: Cardinal-Priest pro hac vice of Sant'Angelo in Pescheria (1938-46)
- Previous post: Cardinal-Deacon of Sant'Angelo in Pescheria (1935-38)

Orders
- Ordination: 30 July 1901 by Emiliano Manacorda
- Consecration: 24 April 1938 by Gennaro Granito Pignatelli di Belmonte
- Created cardinal: 16 December 1935 by Pope Pius XI
- Rank: Cardinal-Deacon (1935-38); Cardinal-Priest (1938-46)

Personal details
- Born: Pietro Boetto; 19 May 1871 Vigone, Kingdom of Italy
- Died: 31 January 1946 (aged 74) Genoa, Kingdom of Italy
- Buried: Genoa Cathedral
- Parents: Antonio Boetto; Caterina Anghilano
- Motto: Immoletur coram Domino
- Coat of arms

Pietro Boetto, S.J. (19 May 1871 – 31 January 1946) was an Italian Cardinal of the Roman Catholic Church who served as Archbishop of Genoa from 1938 until his death, and was elevated to the cardinalate in 1935. He also resisted the Italian fascist regime and saved Jews during WW II.

== Life and Church ==
Pietro Boetto was born in Vigone to Antonio and Caterina (née Anghilano) Boetto. One of two brothers and three sisters, he was confirmed by Bishop Filippo Chiesa of Pinerolo in 1883. Boetto attended the diocesan seminary of Giaveno from 1884 to 1888, when he entered the Society of Jesus on 1 February. While studying at the novitiate in Chieri, he took his first vows on 8 September 1890. In 1901 he was ordained to the subdiaconate (28 July), diaconate (29 July) and finally priesthood (by Bishop Emiliano Manacorda on 30 July). After finishing his studies in theology in 1902, Boetto then served as a professor and the rector of the Genoese "Istituto Arecco" until 1904. He took his final vows as a Jesuit on 2 February 1906 whilst serving as rector of St. Thomas College in Cuneo (1905–1907). From 1907 to 1916, he was procurator of the Jesuit residence in Turin. Boetto was provincial of the Jesuit Province of Turin before going to Spain to serve as a visitor to the Jesuit Provinces of Aragón (1919–1920) and later of Castilla (1920–1921). He also served as Procurator General of the Society of Jesus (1921–1928), provincial of the Roman Province (1928–1930), and Assistant to Italy (1930–1935).

Pope Pius XI created Boetto Cardinal Deacon of Sant'Angelo in Pescheria in the consistory of 16 December 1935. On 17 March 1938, he was appointed Archbishop of Genoa. Boetto opted to become a Cardinal Priest (with the same titular church), a day after his appointment to Genoa, on 18 March. He received his episcopal consecration on the following 24 April 1938 from Cardinal Gennaro Pignatelli di Belmonte, with Archbishops Giuseppe Migone and Giovanni Vallega serving as co-consecrators, in the church of Sant'Ignazio.

Boetto was one of the cardinal electors who participated in the 1939 papal conclave, which selected Pope Pius XII. During World War II, he was a staunch defender of Genoa and its citizens. He protested against the shelling of the city by British warships, claiming God would assure the triumph of Italy. On 8 December 1945, Genoa awarded its Cardinal with citizenship after he urged all Axis forces near the city into surrender.

Boetto died from a heart attack at 1:30 a.m. in his archiepiscopal residence, at age 74. His Requiem Mass was celebrated five days later, on 4 February 1946, by Bishop Pasquale Righetti at San Lorenzo Cathedral; Bishop Giuseppe Siri, the auxiliary of Genoa, delivered the funeral oration. Boetto was finally buried in the crypt near the main altar of that same cathedral of Genoa.

In 2016, Yad Vashem awarded him the honour of 'Righteous Among the Nations.

Catholic Church titles
Preceded by Carlo Minoretti	Archbishop of Genoa; 1938–1946	Succeeded by Giuseppe Siri
