= Deaths in March 1985 =

The following is a list of notable deaths in March 1985.

Entries for each day are listed alphabetically by surname. A typical entry lists information in the following sequence:

- Name, age, country of citizenship at birth, subsequent country of citizenship (if applicable), reason for notability, cause of death (if known), and reference.

== March 1985 ==
=== 1 ===
- George Banks, 46, American baseball player, amyotrophic lateral sclerosis.
- Henry Butters, 86, Scottish civil servant.
- Charlotte Delbo, 71, French memoirist (Auschwitz and After), lung cancer.
- Oscar C. Eliason, 83, Swedish-born American evangelist.
- Han Xianglin, 78-79, Chinese humanitarian.
- Abdul Kadir, 67-68, Turkish poet.
- Daniel Richard Lascelles, 76, British barrister.
- Eugene List, 66, American pianist, fall.
- Buck MacDonald, 90, American football player.
- Bob Parsons, 69, American basketball player.
- Alf Pope, 80, English racewalker.
- Marcelle Rumeau, 72, French politician.
- Alfred Martyn Williams, 87, British politician, MP (1924–1929).
- Ralph Williams, 79, Welsh footballer.
- Olgivanna Lloyd Wright, 86, Montenegrin-American dancer.
- Alfred Zeisler, 87, American-born German filmmaker.

=== 2 ===
- Carl Bacchus, 80, American football player.
- Edgar Behr, 74, German Olympic sailor (1932).
- Arthur Champion, Baron Champion, 87, British politician, MP (1945–1959).
- Mercury Ghilarov, 72, Soviet soil scientist.
- Jackson Graham, 69, American general.
- Leslie Green, 71, American baseball player.
- Lauri Hakulinen, 85, Finnish linguist.
- Omer Huyse, 86, Belgian racing cyclist.
- Jack Kelly Jr., 57, American Olympic rower (1956) and politician, heart attack.
- Robert Bruce Lindsay, 85, American physicist.
- Tim Robb, 60, Australian footballer.
- Wilhelm Rothmayer, 74, Austrian Olympic runner (1936).
- Runme Shaw, 84, Singaporean businessman (Shaw Organisation).
- William Stringfellow, 56, American theologian, lawyer, and activist, diabetes.
- Gyula Szepes, 85, Hungarian Olympic skier (1928).
- Julie Vlasto, 81, French tennis player.
- Alexander Watt, 92, Scottish botanist.

=== 3 ===
- Alan Beaney, 80, British politician, MP (1959–1974).
- Sarah Gibson Blanding, 86, American academic administrator.
- Kyril Bonfiglioli, 56, British novelist (Mortdecai) and art dealer, cirrhosis.
- Jack Boyd, 63, Australian politician.
- Krešimir Friedrich, 86, Yugoslav Croatian tennis player.
- Thomas F. Gallagher, 87, American judge.
- Connie Gilchrist, 89, American actress.
- Jean Nickels, 68, Luxembourgish Olympic canoeist (1948).
- F. S. Northedge, 66, British political scientist.
- Howard Okey, 79, Australian footballer.
- Noel Purcell, 84, Irish actor.
- Hermann Roßmann, 83, German writer.
- Sándor Scheiber, 71, Hungarian rabbi, cancer.
- Iosif Shklovsky, 68, Soviet astrophysicist and astronomer.

=== 4 ===
- Pete Karpuk, 58, Canadian football player, heart attack.
- Julia Southard Lee, 87, American textile chemist.
- Odd Rasdal, 73, Norwegian Olympic runner (1936).
- Rod Smylie, 89, Canadian ice hockey player.
- Vera Brown Starr, 60, American politician.
- Lukas Strachan, 77, South African rugby player.
- Sverre Strandli, 59, Norwegian Olympic hammer thrower (1952, 1956, 1960).
- Wolfgang Weber, 82, German photojournalist and film producer.

=== 5 ===
- William Dawnay-Mould, 83, English-born Australian politician.
- John Finlay, 66, English footballer.
- Sven-Olov Lawesson, 58, Swedish chemist.
- Thomas Little, 98, American set decorator.
- Dave McGrath, 85, Australian footballer.
- Oskar Ritter, 83, German footballer.
- Pat Ryan, 34, New Zealand rugby player, cancer.
- Eric Sloane, 80, American artist, heart attack.
- Cyril Stiles, 80, New Zealand Olympic rower (1932).
- Willard Stone, 69, American woodcarver.
- Ruben Tagalog, 62, Filipino actor and musician.
- Alter Tsypkin, 94, Soviet lawyer and legal scholar.
- Brenda Ueland, 93, American journalist and author.

=== 6 ===
- Martin Begley, 81, American actor and talent scout.
- Klemens Biniakowski, 82, Polish Olympic sprinter (1928).
- Hans Brunke, 80, German footballer.
- Russell Cunningham, 79, Canadian politician.
- Martha Dix, 89, German goldsmith and silversmith.
- Elise Harmon, 75, American chemist, biologist and inventor.
- Sebastian Huber, 83, German Olympic bobsledder (1928, 1932).
- Kenneth McFarland, 78, American educator and political commentator.
- Marisa Mori, 84, Italian painter.
- Marion Nicoll, 75, Canadian painter.
- Denzil Peiris, 67, Sri Lankan journalist.
- Anthony Russo, 65, American politician, member of the Ohio House of Representatives (1967–1972).

=== 7 ===
- Danny Blair, 80, Scottish footballer.
- Wilfred Brown, Baron Brown, 76, British businessman and politician.
- Frank Catrone, 78, American horse racing jockey.
- Max Cross, 50, Australian footballer.
- Victorio Edades, 89, Filipino painter.
- Victor Farris, 75, American businessman and inventor.
- Arkady Fiedler, 90, Polish journalist and traveler.
- Raúl Lacabanne, 70, Argentine politician.
- Sir Ralph Morton, 88, Zimbabwean judge.
- Clara Winsome Muirhead, 69, Scottish botanist.
- Alan Muntz, 85, British aeronautical engineer.
- Jessie Oonark, 79, Canadian artist.
- George Schick, 76, Czech-American conductor and music educator.
- Robert W. Woodruff, 95, American businessman (The Coca-Cola Company) and philanthropist.

=== 8 ===
- G. Allana, 78, Pakistani author and poet.
- Edward Andrews, 70, American actor, heart attack.
- Bertram L. Baker, 87, American politician, member of the New York State Assembly (1949–1970).
- Bull Curry, 71, American professional wrestler, liver disease.
- Edgar Dale, 84, American educator.
- George A. Doole Jr., 75, American Air Force pilot.
- Gladys Egan, 84, American actress.
- Lorenzo Elizaga, 81, Mexican Olympic bobsledder (1928).
- Reuben Goodstein, 72, English mathematician.
- Laura Guggenbühl, 83, American mathematician.
- LeRoy R. Hafen, 91, American historian.
- Ralph Ingersoll, 84, American publisher.
- Kim Yong-sik, 74, South Korean footballer.
- Charles Guy Parsloe, 84, British historian and politician.
- Paul Ramdohr, 95, German mineralogist.
- Margaretta Salinger, 77, American art historian.
- Runor Sandström, 75, Swedish Olympic water polo player (1936).
- Lon Stiner, 81, American football player and coach.
- Al Todd, 83, American baseball player, manager and scout.
- Donald M. Weller, 76, American general.
- James Roger Whelan, 70, Canadian RAF pilot.

=== 9 ===
- Robert Blackwell, 66, American record producer and bandleader, pneumonia.
- Harry Catterick, 65, English footballer.
- William Fisher, 94, American painter.
- Chan Gurney, 88, American politician, member of the U.S. Senate (1939–1951).
- Edmund Henry Hambly, 80, British politician, linguist and surgeon.
- Campbell Hoy, 92, British flying ace.
- Percy Hunt, 62, Australian footballer.
- William E. Jenner, 76, American politician, member of the U.S. Senate (1944–1945, 1947–1959), respiratory disease.
- John Tudor Jones, 81, Welsh journalist, poet and translator.
- Richard Oetzel, 83, German politician.
- Isaac Phills, 89, Canadian steelworker.
- K. Rajalingam, 75, Sri Lankan politician.
- Annar Ryen, 75, Norwegian skier.
- Göran Widenfelt, 56, Swedish Olympic athlete (1948, 1952).

=== 10 ===
- Alan Barber, 79, English cricketer.
- Gustavo Capanema, 84, Brazilian politician.
- Konstantin Chernenko, 73, Soviet politician, general secretary (since 1984), emphysema.
- Bill Cooper, 70, American baseball player.
- Salawati Daud, 75, Indonesian politician.
- James Frazier, 44, American conductor.
- Victor Hervey, 6th Marquess of Bristol, 69, British businessman and hereditary peer.
- Wally Hull, 78, English speedway racer.
- Angelo Raffaele Jervolino, 94, Italian politician.
- Eddie Lang, 49, American R&B singer.
- Bob Nieman, 58, American baseball player, heart attack.
- Israel Regardie, 77, English-American magician and occultist, heart attack.
- Leslie Nelson Shaw, 62, American postmaster.
- Joan Shorenstein, 38, American journalist, breast cancer.
- C. B. van Niel, 87, Dutch-American microbiologist.

=== 11 ===
- Tom Adams, 53, Barbadian politician, prime minister (since 1976), heart attack.
- Nazem Akkari, 82-83, Lebanese politician, prime minister (1952).
- William Bailey, 66, British-Portuguese naval commander.
- Ernest W. Barrett, 62, American politician.
- Mitter Bedi, 59, Indian photographer, heart failure.
- Laurent Boillat, 73, Swiss sculptor.
- Constant Bucher, 85, Swiss Olympic athlete (1920, 1924).
- Brigitte Gros, 59, French politician and journalist.
- Lee Shepherd, 40, American racing driver, racing crash.
- Indumati Chimanlal Sheth, 78, Indian politician and independence activist.

=== 12 ===
- Earle Clements, 88, American politician, member of the U.S. House of Representatives (1945–1948) and Senate (1950–1957), governor of Kentucky (1947–1950).
- José de Rivera, 80, American sculptor, complications from a stroke.
- Alfred Eluère, 91, French rugby player.
- Ronald Gibbs, 84, American football player and coach.
- Harry Gideonse, 83, Dutch-born American economist.
- Ragnvald Marensius Gundersen, 77, Norwegian politician.
- Sig Herzig, 87, American screenwriter and playwright.
- Hugh Hibbert, 73, English cricketer.
- Stjepan Horvat, 89, Yugoslav Croatian geodesist and academic administrator.
- Harras Kyttä, 72, Finnish politician, MP (1951–1964).
- George L. Leech, 94, American Roman Catholic prelate.
- Alastair Mars, 70, English submarine commander and author.
- Eugene Ormandy, 85, Hungarian-born American violinist and conductor, pneumonia.
- Juan Sordo Madaleno, 68, Mexican architect.
- Yang Kui, 78, Taiwanese writer and activist.

=== 13 ===
- Mabel Alvarez, 93, American painter.
- Elmer A. Benson, 89, American politician, governor of Minnesota (1937–1939), member of the U.S. Senate (1935–1936).
- Louise Holland Coe, 90, American politician, member of the New Mexico Senate (1925–1941).
- Dinesh Das, 71, Indian poet and political activist.
- Hans Eckstein, 76, German Olympic water polo player (1932).
- Hossein Gol-e-Golab, 89-90, Iranian scholar and lyricist ("Ey Iran").
- Jules Gregory, 64, American architect.
- Annette Hanshaw, 83, American singer, cancer.
- Henry Hunt, 61, Canadian woodcarver.
- Stephen Morin, 34, American convicted serial killer, execution by lethal injection.
- Bernard Nanga, 50, Cameroonian philosopher and sociologist.
- Narla Venkateswara Rao, 76, Indian journalist and politician.
- Janet Auchincloss Rutherfurd, 39, American socialite, lung cancer.
- Evald Segerström, 82, Swedish Olympic racewalker (1936).
- Bob Shad, 65, American record producer, heart attack.
- Jesús Silva Herzog, 92, Mexican economist and historian.
- James D. Williams, 42, American politician, member of the Pennsylvania House of Representatives (since 1981).

=== 14 ===
- Norma Elizabeth Boyd, 96, American educator.
- Joe Brown, 75, American sculptor.
- Hélio Lourenço de Oliveira, 67, Brazilian physician.
- Wilf Humble, 48, English footballer.
- Kathleen Lemass, 86, Irish socialite, spouse of the Taoiseach (1959–1966).
- Sir Arthur Nevill, 85, New Zealand military aviator.
- Jock O'Brien, 76, Australian footballer.
- František Patočka, 80, Czechoslovak microbiologist.
- Karel Zouhar, 68, Czechoslovak military aviator.

=== 15 ===
- George Abramson, 81, American football player.
- Elizabeth Ann Bartholomew, 72, American botanist.
- Oscar J. Brittingham Jr., 78, American politician.
- Radha Krishna Choudhary, 64, Indian historian, cardiac arrest.
- Morry Davis, 90, British politician.
- Alan A. Freeman, 64, English record producer.
- Helge Haavind, 68, Norwegian barrister.
- Ian Lapraik, 69, British soldier.
- Aroj Ali Matubbar, 84, Bangladeshi philosopher.
- Kazimierz Polus, 55, Polish convicted serial killer, execution by hanging.

=== 16 ===
- Mehdi Bakeri, 31, Iranian soldier, killed in action.
- Marius Cayouette, 80, Canadian organist and composer.
- Musuri Krishnamurthy, 55, Indian actor and filmmaker.
- Archibald Lamont, 77, Scottish paleontologist and geologist.
- Frédéric Langrenay, 85, French Olympic runner (1920).
- Jean Purdy, 39, British embryologist, melanoma.
- Edwin J. Roland, 80, American Coast Guard admiral.
- Bert Röling, 78, Dutch jurist.
- G. B. Senanayake, 71, Sri Lankan novelist.
- Roger Sessions, 88, American composer and music educator.
- Eddie Shore, 82, Canadian ice hockey player.
- Ernst Tillich, 74, German theologian.

=== 17 ===
- Anita Boyer, 69, American singer.
- Nikolai Gusarov, 79, Soviet Byelorussian politician.
- Frank Lock, 63, English footballer.
- Bongi Makeba, 34, South African singer, complications from childbirth.
- Eva Morrison, 74, American long-distance swimmer.
- Ike Pearson, 68, American baseball player.
- Dattu Phadkar, 59, Indian cricketer.
- Ali-Akbar Shahnazi, 87, Iranian tar musician.
- Athole Shearer, 84, Canadian-American actress and socialite.
- Kelly Tarlton, 47, New Zealand marine archaeologist.

=== 18 ===
- Ernest Cassutto, 65, Dutch-American memoirist.
- Myrtle Cook, 83, Canadian Olympic runner (1928).
- Charlie Healy, 85, Australian footballer.
- Walter T. McCarthy, 86-87, American judge.
- Pang Xunqin, 78, Chinese artist.
- Victor Staley, 85, English footballer.
- Merrill C. Tenney, 80, American Biblical scholar and theologian.
- L. R. G. Treloar, 78, British polymer scientist.
- Dudley Williams, 75-76, Australian public servant.
- Eddie Younger, 62, American basketball player.

=== 19 ===
- Cairo Dixon, 74, Australian footballer.
- Oliver Dolan, 91, English rugby player.
- Giuseppe Ercolani, 83, Italian racing cyclist.
- Michał Górski, 73, Polish Olympic skier (1936).
- Thomas J. Hatem, 59, American politician, member of the Maryland House of Delegates (1955–1958), leukemia.
- Anthony Nelson Keys, 73, British film producer.
- Everett Newcomb, 89, Canadian politician.
- Erik Palmén, 86, Finnish meteorologist.
- Jesús Reyes Heroles, 63, Mexican politician, lung cancer.
- Leopold Tyrmand, 64, Polish-American writer and novelist, heart attack.
- Harue Yamashita, 83, Japanese politician.

=== 20 ===
- Victor Capesius, 78, German pharmacist and concentration camp official.
- W. L. Cook, 90, American politician, member of the Arizona House of Representatives (1949–1963).
- John B. Lis, 69, American politician, member of the New York State Assembly (1954–1972), cancer.
- Margarete Rosenberg, 74, German train conductor and Holocaust survivor.
- Robert Young, 93, British politician, MP (1929–1931).

=== 21 ===
- Bjørn Benterud, 84, Norwegian sports official.
- Tito Davison, 72, Chilean-born Mexican filmmaker.
- Stevan Jakuš, 63, Yugoslav footballer.
- Hossein Khalatbari, 35, Iranian fighter pilot, shootdown.
- Billy Lynch, 75, Australian footballer.
- Stefan Matuszewski, 79, Polish politician and educator.
- Hassan Qraytim, 65-66, Lebanese politician.
- Sir Michael Redgrave, 77, English actor (Mourning Becomes Electra, Time Without Pity, The Browning Version), Parkinson's disease.
- Stanisław Rembek, 83, Polish novelist.
- Joseph Tezanos, 64, American Coast Guard officer.
- Michael Trubshawe, 79, British actor.
- Donald Wright, 78, American judge.

=== 22 ===
- Arthur Allyn Jr., 71, American baseball executive.
- Hamoud Al-Jaifi, 67, Yemeni politician, prime minister (1964–1965).
- Ben Jannif, 76, Fijian politician.
- Albin Jansson, 87, Swedish ice hockey player.
- Salomon Klass, 77, Finnish soldier.
- Grégoire Laurent, 79, Luxembourgish Olympic boxer (1924).
- Károly Olt, 80, Hungarian politician.
- Frank Sancet, 77, American baseball player.
- Raoul Ubac, 74, French artist.
- Spyros Vassiliou, 81, Greek artist.
- Marvin Yancy, 34, American gospel singer, heart attack.

=== 23 ===
- Richard Beeching, Baron Beeching, 71, British railway executive.
- Peter Charanis, 76, Greek-born American historian.
- Anton Constandse, 85, Dutch author and journalist.
- Ben Hardwick, 3, British child, country's youngest liver transplant patient, complications from surgery.
- Patricia Roberts Harris, 60, American politician and diplomat, HUD secretary (1977–1979) and HHS secretary (1979–1981), breast cancer.
- Reginald Hyde, 72, New Zealand flying ace.
- Asao Koike, 54, Japanese actor.
- Joseph-Armand Landry, 66, Canadian politician, MP (1957–1958).
- José Alberto Medrano, 67, Salvadoran general, shot.
- Lefty Mellix, 88, American baseball player.
- Joseph Novales, 47, Spanish-born French racing cyclist.
- Zoot Sims, 59, American jazz saxophonist, lung cancer.

=== 24 ===
- Arthur Blake, 71, American actor and drag queen, heart attack.
- Johnny Curran, 60, Scottish footballer.
- Dorothy Gordon, 94, Australian actress and journalist.
- Dick Kinney, 68, American comic book writer and animator.
- Malcolm Laney, 74-75, American college sports coach.
- George London, 64, American opera singer, heart attack.
- José Luis Munguía, 25, Salvadoran footballer, traffic collision.
- Arthur D. Nicholson, 37, American soldier, shot.
- Colm O'Brien, 37, Irish Olympic fencer (1968).
- Sandër Prosi, 65, Albanian actor.
- Elwyn B. Robinson, 79, American historian.
- Dorothy Roe, 80, American journalist.
- Gertrud Schubart-Fikentscher, 88, German legal scholar.
- Ed Stege, 71, American basketball player.

=== 25 ===
- Karl Gustav Ahlefeldt, 75, Danish actor.
- Curt Barclay, 53, American baseball player, cancer.
- Horace Birks, 87, British general.
- William Clyde, 72, British flying ace.
- Victor Herman, 69, American parachute jumper and Soviet prisoner.
- Thelma Kench, 71, New Zealand Olympic sprinter (1932).
- Zvee Scooler, 85, Russian-born American actor and radio commentator.
- Joe Wood, 65, American baseball player, house fire.

=== 26 ===
- Mort Hoppenfeld, 56, American urban planner, heart attack.
- Norton Hughes-Hallett, 89, British cricketer.
- Žarko Jovanović, 59, Yugoslav Serbian musician.
- Kamraj Kesari, 62, Indian cricketer.
- Delmas H. Nucker, 77, American politician and government official, heart attack.
- Irene Savidge, 79, British factory worker and police interrogation subject.
- John Ward-Harrison, 66-67, British general.
- Henry J. Wilson, 80, British soldier and farmer.

=== 27 ===
- Pierino Baffi, 54, Italian racing cyclist.
- Hugh Farquharson, 73, Canadian ice hockey player.
- Mae Glover, 78, American blues singer.
- Lydia Manley Henry, 93, British-Canadian medical practitioner.
- Ingeborg Hoffmann, 63, German actress, pulmonary embolism.
- Ben Ramsey, 81, American politician, lieutenant governor of Texas (1951–1961).
- Edgar Preston Richardson, 82, American museum director and art historian, complications from a stroke.
- Don Rico, 72, American comic book writer and artist, co-creator of Black Widow, cancer.
- Robert Shaw, 80, American politician, member of the Ohio Senate (1967–1972).
- Ellen S. Spinden, 87, American archaeologist.
- Péter Szervánszky, 71, Hungarian violinist.
- Einar Tufte-Johnsen, 69, Norwegian aviation officer.
- Christopher Vokes, 80, Canadian general.

=== 28 ===
- Princess Amalie Isabella of Bavaria, 63, German royal.
- Louis-Philippe Beaubien, 82, Canadian politician.
- J. Seelye Bixler, 90, American academic administrator, pneumonia.
- Ana Rosa Chacón, 95-96, Costa Rican educator and social activist.
- Marc Chagall, 97, Russian-French artist.
- Ray Dodge, 84, American Olympic runner (1924).
- József Györe, 82, Hungarian politician.
- Henry Hansen, 83, Danish racing cyclist.
- Eduard Neumann, 81, German philologist.
- Marcus Nikkanen, 81, Finnish Olympic figure skater (1928, 1932, 1936).
- Jackie Parr, 64, English footballer.
- Edward Rosen, 78, American historian, heart failure.
- Sandford Lad, 14, British Thoroughbred racehorse.
- Odie Spears, 60, American basketball player.
- C. Clifton Virts, 75, American politician, member of the Maryland House of Delegates (1947–1978).
- George Lavan Weissman, 68, American communist activist and journalist.

=== 29 ===
- Roald Amundsen, 71, Norwegian footballer.
- Sir Ken Anderson, 75, Australian politician, complications from Alzheimer's disease.
- Ed Bagdonas, 47, American Olympic hammer thrower (1960).
- Rudolph Charles, 46, Trinidadian steelpan musician.
- Sir Fife Clark, 77, British journalist.
- Hermann Herbold, 78, German Olympic rower (1928).
- Rae Jenkins, 81, Welsh violinist.
- George Murdock, 87, American anthropologist.
- Louis A. Perrotta, 84, Italian-born American surgeon.
- Jorge Reyes, 78, Argentine-Mexican actor.
- The Singing Nun, 51, Belgian Roman Catholic nun and singer ("Dominique"), suicide by drug overdose.
- Gerhard Stöck, 73, German Olympic athlete (1936) and Nazi officer.
- Joseph Symonds, 85, British politician, MP (1959–1970).
- Luther Terry, 73, American physician and public health official, surgeon general (1961–1965), heart attack.
- Bob Wilson, 58, Scottish rugby player.

=== 30 ===
- George Cox Jr, 73, English cricketer.
- J. V. Cunningham, 73, American poet and literary critic, heart failure.
- Innokenti Gerasimov, 79, Soviet geographer.
- John Jolliffe, 55, British librarian and academic.
- Shizuko Kasagi, 70, Japanese singer and actress, ovarian cancer.
- Stefan Maria Kuczyński, 80, Polish historian.
- Bobby Main, 76, Scottish footballer.
- Yaeko Nogami, 99, Japanese novelist.
- Kenkichi Oshima, 76, Japanese Olympic jumper (1932).
- Harold Peary, 76, American actor and comedian (The Great Gildersleeve), heart attack.
- Harry Pringle, 81, Australian radio and television producer.
- Martin Roseveare, 86, English mathematician.
- Valter Schytt, 65, Swedish glaciologist.
- Marek Żuławski, 76, Polish painter and historian.

=== 31 ===
- Erik Burman, 87, Swedish ice hockey player.
- Guillermo Carnero Hoke, 67, Peruvian writer and indigenous rights activist, stroke.
- Joseph Elsberry, 63, American Air Force officer (Tuskegee Airmen), heart attack.
- Michel Georges-Michel, 101, French writer, translator and artist.
- T. C. Kelly, 67, Irish composer.
- Richard McKeon, 84, American philosopher.
- João Moojen, 80, Brazilian zoologist.
- David James Nielson, 72, British soldier and businessman.
- Joseph Rogatchewsky, 93, Russian-born French singer.
