= Tallie Broodryk =

South African rugby union player

- Born: Jan Andreas Broodryk; 11 April 1910 Loxton, Cape Colony
- Died: 22 October 1993 (aged 83) Calitzdorp, South Africa
- School: Hoërskool Tulbagh, Tulbagh

Rugby union career
- Position: Wing
Amateur team(s)
Years	Team	Apps	(Points)
- Pretoria Police RC
Provincial / State sides
Years	Team	Apps	(Points)
–	Transvaal		
1938	Northern Transvaal		
International career
Years	Team	Apps	(Points)
1937	South Africa (tour)	6	(22)

Jan Andreas "Tallie" Broodryk (11 April 1910 – 22 October 1993) was a South African rugby union player.

== Biography ==
Broodryk was born in Loxton, schooled in Tulbagh and then joined the South African Police. He became a member of the Pretoria Police Rugby Club and initially played provincial rugby for Transvaal, because the Northern Transvaal Rugby Union was only established in 1938. After the establishment of the Northern Transvaal, Broodryk played in its very first match against Transvaal on Monday, 18 April 1938. Along with Broodryk, there were six more Springboks in the Northern Transvaal team, namely, Ferdie Bergh, who captained the side, Roger Sherriff, Lukas Strachan, Nick Bierman, Ben du Toit and the scrumhalf Danie Craven.

Broodryk was a member of the 1937 Springbok touring team to Australia and New Zealand. He did not play in any of the test matches, but played in 6 tour matches and scored 6 tries and a drop goal.

== See also ==
- List of South Africa national rugby union players – Springbok no. 244
