= Rudice =

Rudice may refer to places:

- Rudice (Blansko District), a municipality and village in the Czech Republic
- Rudice (Uherské Hradiště District), a municipality and village in the Czech Republic
- Rudice, Bosnia and Herzegovina, a village in Bosnia and Herzegovina
