= Cassuto =

Cassuto is a surname. Notable people with the surname include:

- Álvaro Cassuto (1938–2026), Portuguese composer and conductor
- Judah Cassuto (1808–1893), Dutch-German hazzan (cantor) of the Portuguese-Jewish community
- Nathan Cassuto (1909–1945), Italian ophthalmologist and rabbi
- Philippe Cassuto (1959–2020), French hellenist, biblical scholar and academic
- Sherry Cassuto (1957–2016), American rower
- Solica Cassuto, Greek actress, and second wife of actor Andy Griffith
- Thierry Cassuto (born 1959), French-born South African film and television producer
- Umberto Cassuto (1883–1951), Italian rabbi and biblical scholar

== See also ==
- Cassutt
- Cassutto
