= James Whelan =

James Whelan may refer to:

- James Whelan, research fellow of the Australian think tank Centre for Policy Development
- James Whelan (bishop) (1823–1878), Roman Catholic Bishop of Nashville (1860–1864)
- James Whelan (cyclist) (born 1996), Australian cyclist
- James R. Whelan (1933–2012), American journalist and historian
- James Roger Whelan (1914–1985), Royal Air Force officer
- James Whelan (Pennsylvania politician) (born 1936), American politician
- Jim Whelan (1948–2017), American Democratic Party politician in the New Jersey State Senate
- Jim Whelan (footballer) (1871–1949), Australian rules footballer

== See also ==
- Wife to James Whelan, a 1937 play
- Whelan, surname
