= Daniel Lascelles =

Daniel Lascelles may refer to:

- Daniel Lascelles (1655–1734), English landowner and politician
- Daniel Lascelles (1714–1784), English landowner and politician, grandson of above
- Daniel Lascelles (diplomat) (1902–1967), British diplomat
- Daniel Richard Lascelles (1908–1985), British colonial judge

== See also ==
- Daniel Lassalle (born 1965), trombonist
