= Cassutto =

Cassutto is a surname. Notable people with the surname include:

- Ernest Cassutto (1919–1985), Dutch Holocaust survivor
- Elisabeth Cassutto (1931–1984), wife of Ernest Cassutto

== See also ==
- Cassuto
