= Cassutt =

Cassutt may refer to:

- Michael Cassutt (born 1954), American television producer, screenwriter, and author
- Cassutt Special, a tiny single-seat racing aircraft
  - List of aircraft (C) § Cassutt

== See also ==
- Cassutto
- Cassatt (disambiguation)
