= Umberto Cassuto =

Italian historian, rabbi, and scholar

- משה דוד קָאסוּטוֹ
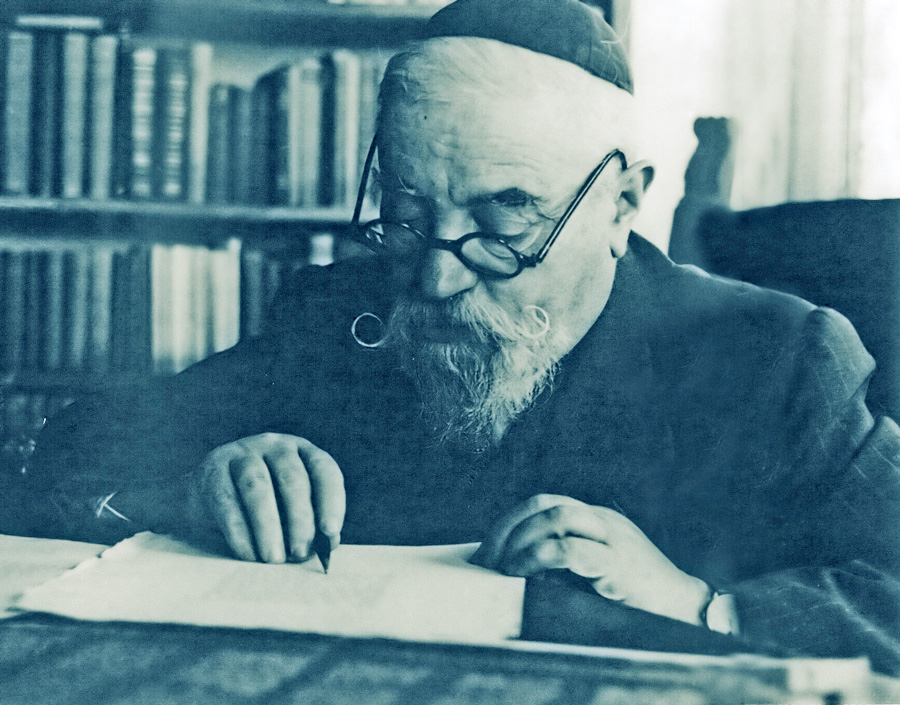
- Cassuto in the 1940s
- Born: 16 September 1883; Firenze, Italy
- Died: 18 December 1951 (aged 68); Jerusalem, Israel
- Resting place: Sanhedria Cemetery
- Children: Nathan Cassuto

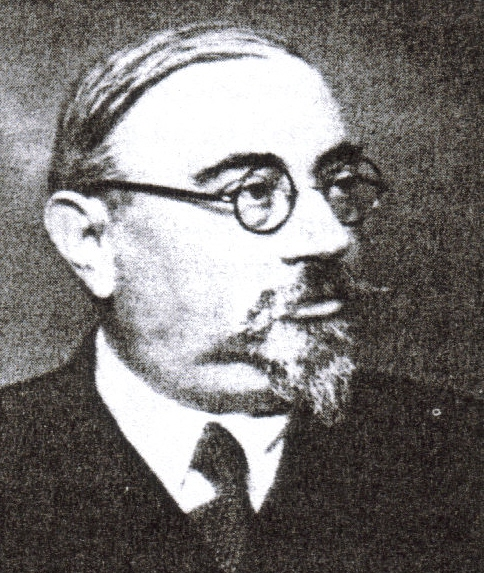
Umberto Cassuto

Umberto Cassuto, also known as Moshe David Cassuto (16 September 1883 – 19 December 1951), was an Italian historian, a rabbi, and a scholar of the Hebrew Bible and Ugaritic literature, in the University of Florence, then at the University of Rome La Sapienza. When the 1938 antisemitic Italian racial laws forced him from this position, he moved to the Hebrew University of Jerusalem.

== Early life and career ==
Cassuto was born in Florence as the son of Gustavo and Ernesta Galletti in a traditionalist Jewish family. Cassuto studied there at the University of Florence (graduated in 1906), and the Collegio Rabbinico (ordained in 1908), where its principal Samuel Hirsch Margulies had a profound influence on him. After getting a degree and Semicha, he taught at both institutions. From 1922 to 1925, he was Chief Rabbi of Florence. In 1925 he became professor of Hebrew and literature at the University of Florence and then took the chair of Hebrew language at the University of Rome La Sapienza. When the 1938 antisemitic laws forced him from this position, he accepted an invitation to fill the chair of biblical studies at the Hebrew University of Jerusalem in Mandatory Palestine in 1939, where he taught until his death in 1951.

Cassuto was among the early Italian Jewish worshippers in Jerusalem who sought a permanent communal synagogue; a memorial plaque in his honour was unveiled at the Italian Synagogue of Jerusalem at its dedication in 1952.

== Work ==
=== Ugaritic translation and commentary ===
Cassuto was one of the first scholars who understood the importance of the archaeological finds from Ugarit in Syria, and the similarities between the Ugaritic texts and the Hebrew Bible. His Ugaritic studies thus throw considerable light on the literary structure and vocabulary exegesis of the Bible. His treatise Ha-Elah Anat (1951, 1965; The Goddess Anath, 1970), a translation with introduction and commentary of Ugaritic texts, particularly the epic of Baal, is of special importance.

=== Origins of the Pentateuch ===
By the first half of the 20th century, Julius Wellhausen's version of the documentary hypothesis had become the dominant view on the origins of the Pentateuch in academia. Cassuto's The Documentary Hypothesis and the Composition of the Pentateuch (Hebrew, Torat HaTeudot, 1941; English translation, 1961) offered a critique of Wellhausen; Cassuto proposed the Pentateuch was redacted by a school around the 10th century BCE. However, the question of when the Pentateuch was finally written does not affect any element of Cassuto's radical critique of the dominant theories about its actual make-up, which was his chief concern, and so he treats the historical question only at the end and as a secondary issue in The Documentary Hypothesis and the Composition of the Pentateuch. Cassuto insisted throughout this work that it was merely a summary, in eight lectures, of his much more detailed and thorough examination of the documentary hypothesis in his La Questione della Genesi (1934). He refers all serious students to the latter work in almost every chapter. Some idea of that more thorough consideration, however, is available in English in his Commentary on the Book of Genesis (Part I) from Adam to Noah (1961) and (Part II) from Noah to Abraham (1964), and also his Commentary on the Book of Exodus (1967).

Cassuto's criticisms, while influential amongst many Jewish scholars, were dismissed by the overwhelming majority of Christian scholars at the time, although Oswald Thompson Allis (1943) argued along parallel lines. Most scholars have tended to ignore Cassuto's The Documentary Hypothesis and the Composition of the Pentateuch beyond mentioning it in their footnotes listings. Scholars such as Rolf Rendtorff and John Van Seters have also put forward theories on Pentateuchal historical origins very similar to Cassuto's, at least insofar as their views on its mode of composition are concerned. Modern ideas about the dating of the Torah, however, have not endorsed Cassuto's specific early historical dating, and the trend today is for the final act of composition to be seen as lying in the period 500–400 BC, or even later.

=== Text of the Hebrew Bible ===
Cassuto felt the need to produce the most accurate possible text of the Tanakh (Hebrew Bible). He realised that the texts generally published at the time had mostly been edited by non-Jews, and Jews who had converted to Christianity. While Cassuto saw no reason to believe that major alterations had been made, he felt it was important to compare these printed editions with older manuscripts as a check.

Thus Cassuto sought to use the oldest and most reliable manuscripts of the Tanakh, dating back many centuries before the invention of printing. In particular, in 1944 he managed to visit the Great Synagogue of Aleppo, Syria and study the Aleppo Codex. He was one of the very few scholars to study this key manuscript before most of the Torah section and some of the Prophets and Writings sections disappeared in the 1947 anti-Jewish riots in Aleppo.

From his research, he concluded that the printed Bibles generally had an accurate text. However, he corrected the spelling of many words, and made a great many corrections to the vowel points and musical notes. He also revised the layout of the text, its division into paragraphs, the use of poetical lines when he deemed it appropriate (for example, in Psalms, Proverbs and Job) and similar matters. Where he differed from other Bibles in any of these respects, it is likely that Cassuto has better authority. Cassuto's critical edition of the Hebrew Bible was published posthumously in 1953.

=== Bible commentaries ===
Cassuto's most enduring legacy may be his commentaries on the Hebrew Bible. According to the Jewish Virtual Library, his 1944 Shirat ha-Alilah be-Yisrael ("Song of the Plot in Israel", later published in English in Biblical and Oriental Studies II) was Cassuto's 'primary contribution'. He wrote a Hebrew commentary on the Bible that became very popular in Israel. He wrote a more detailed commentary on Exodus and at the time of his death had completed chapters 1–11 of a more detailed commentary on Genesis. Both of these latter commentaries were made available in English, and include his views on the documentary hypothesis.

== Works available in English or Italian ==
- Cassuto, Umberto. La Questione della Genesi. Florence: 1934.
- Cassuto, Umberto. Storia della letteratura ebraica postbiblica. Pp. xvi, 212. Florence: Casa editrice Israel, 1938
- Cassuto, Umberto. The Documentary Hypothesis and the Composition of the Pentateuch: Eight Lectures by U. Cassuto. Translated from the Hebrew by Israel Abrahams. Jerusalem: Shalem Press, Jerusalem, 2006 ISBN 978-965-7052-35-8 2006 pdf version of the book's introduction
- Cassuto, Umberto. A Commentary on the book of Genesis. From Adam to Noah. Translated from the Hebrew by Israel Abrahams. Volume 1 of 2 Volumes Jerusalem: Magnes Press, Hebrew University, 1961–1964 ISBN 978-965-223-480-3
- Cassuto, Umberto. A Commentary on the book of Genesis. From Noah to Avraham. Translated from the Hebrew by Israel Abrahams. Volume 2 of 2 Volumes Jerusalem: Magnes Press, Hebrew University, 1961–1964 ISBN 978-965-223-540-4
- Cassuto, Umberto. A Commentary on the book of Exodus. Translated from the Hebrew by Israel Abrahams. Pp. xvi, 509. Jerusalem: Magnes Press, Hebrew University, 1967
- Cassuto, Umberto. The Goddess Anath: Canaanite Epics on the Patriarchal Age. Translated from the Hebrew by Israel Abrahams. Jerusalem: Magnes Press, Hebrew University, 1971
- Cassuto, Umberto. Biblical and Oriental Studies. Translated from the Hebrew and Italian by Israel Abrahams. 2 vols. Jerusalem: Magnes Press, Hebrew University, 1973–1975

== See also ==
- Abraham Yahuda
- Elijah Benamozegh
- Joshua Berman
- Cassuto family name
- Cyrus Gordon
- Yehezkel Kaufman
- Kenneth Kitchen Egyptologist
- Mosaic authorship
- Gary Rendsburg

== Bibliography ==
- "Umberto Cassuto". Jewish Virtual Library. AICE. 2008.
- "Umberto Cassuto: Maestro di Bibbia nel Paese della Bibbia: Tomo I". La Rassegna Mensile di Israel. 82 (2–3). Unione delle Comunitá Ebraiche Italiane: 19–24. December 2016. JSTOR 26660262.
- Biography and bibliography at the Jewish Virtual Library
- Note on the death of Umberto Cassuto published on the JTA Daily Bulletin.
- Ephraim Chamiel, The Dual Truth, Studies on Nineteenth-Century Modern Religious Thought and its Influence on Twentieth-Century Jewish Philosophy, Academic Studies Press, Boston 2019, Vol II, pp. 500–536.
