= USCGC Joseph Tezanos =

18th Sentinel-class cutter, United States Coast Guard

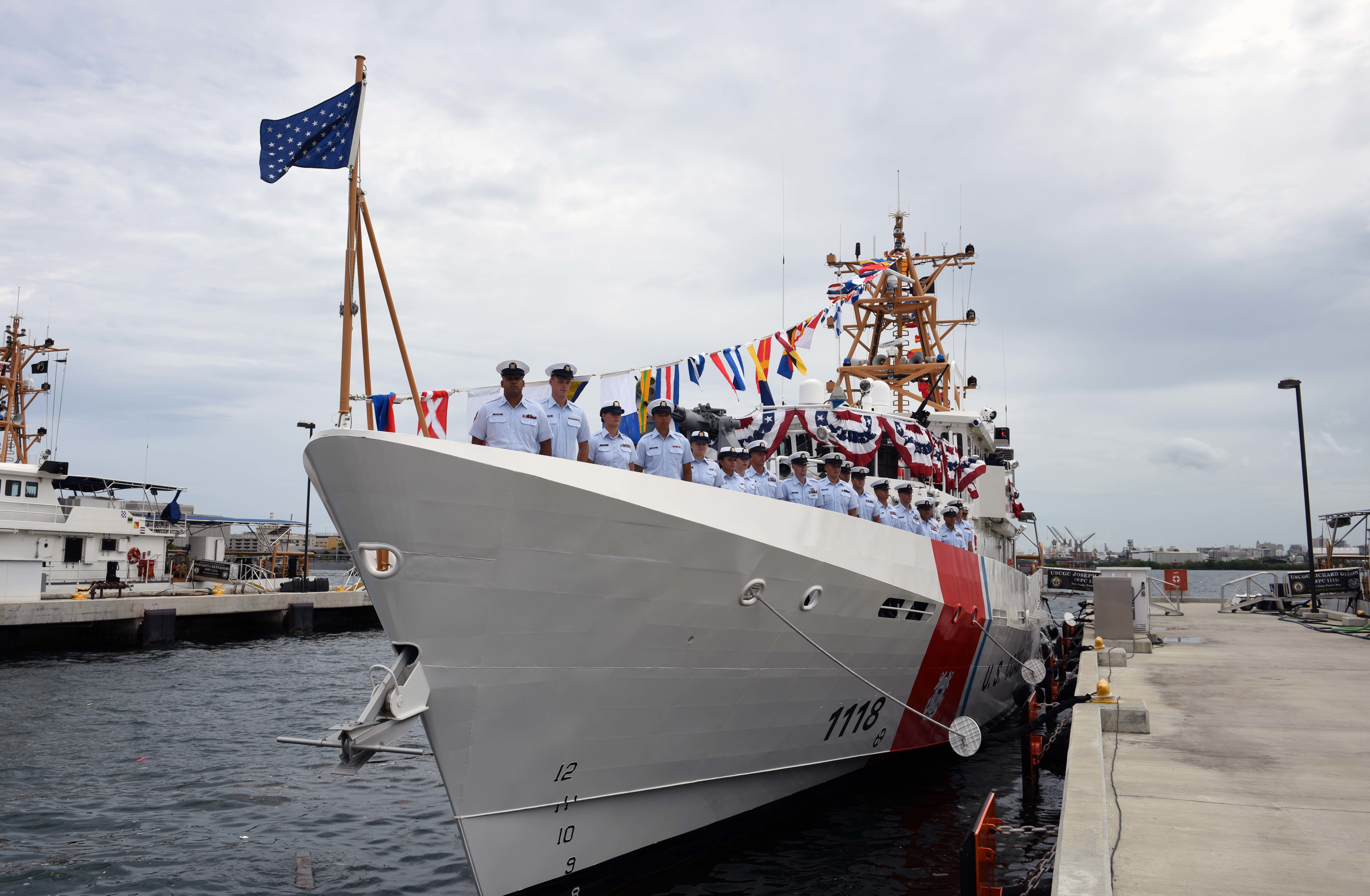
- US Coast Guard Cutter Joseph Tezanos' crew mans the rail during the commissioning ceremony.

History

United States
- Name: Joseph Tezanos
- Namesake: Joseph Tezanos
- Operator: United States Coast Guard
- Builder: Bollinger Shipyards, Lockport, Louisiana
- Acquired: June 22, 2016
- Commissioned: August 26, 2016
- Home port: San Juan, Puerto Rico
- Identification: Hull number: WPC-1118
- Motto: Forjado Del Fuego (Forged Through Fire)
- Status: In active service
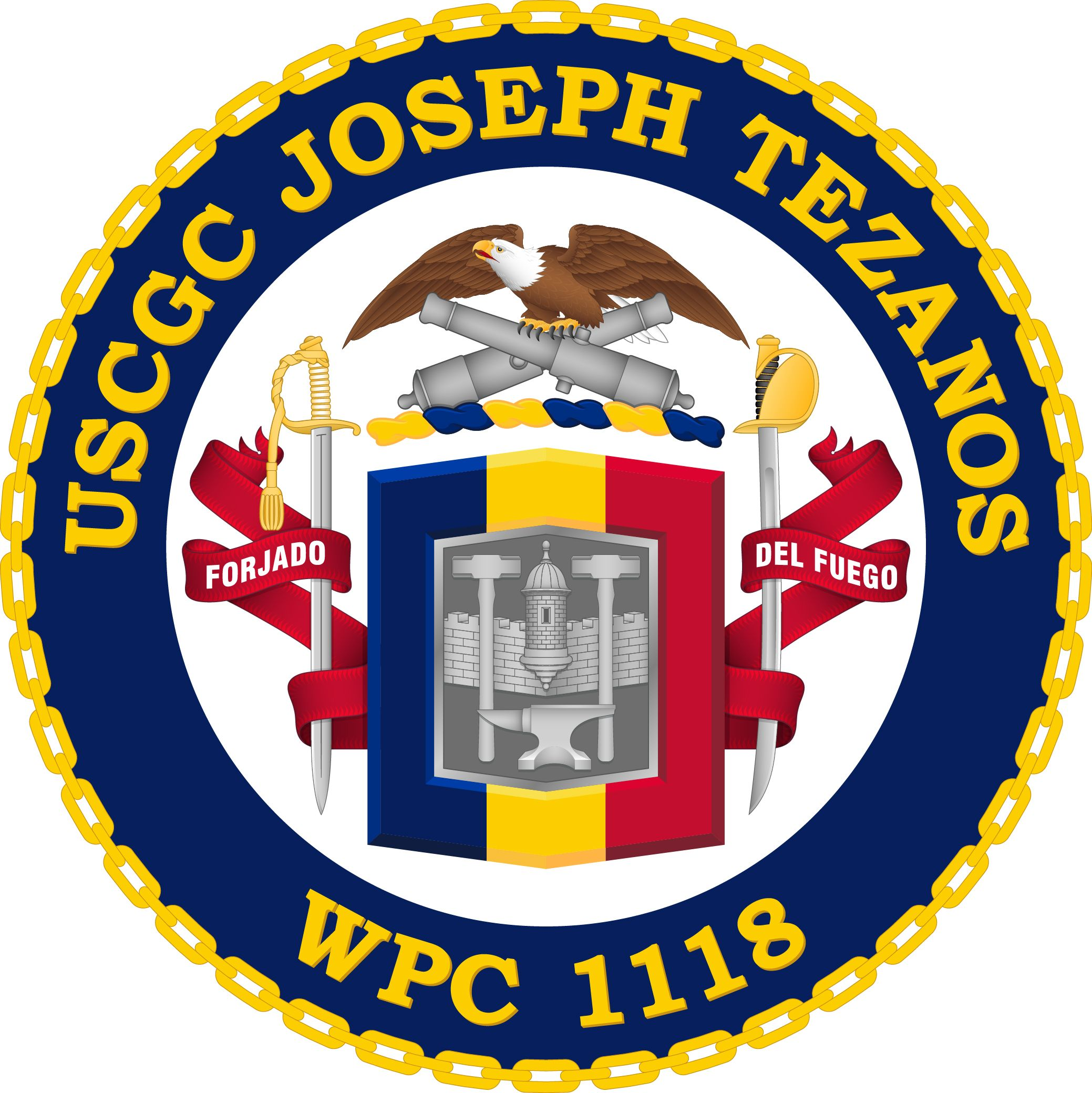
- Badge

General characteristics
- Class & type: Sentinel-class cutter
- Displacement: 353 long tons (359 t)
- Length: 46.8 m (154 ft)
- Beam: 8.11 m (26.6 ft)
- Depth: 2.9 m (9.5 ft)
- Propulsion: 2 × 4,300 kW (5,800 shp); 1 × 75 kW (101 shp) bow thruster
- Speed: 28 knots (52 km/h; 32 mph)
- Range: 2,500 nautical miles (4,600 km; 2,900 mi)
- Endurance: 5 days
- Boats & landing craft carried: 1 × Cutter Boat - Over the Horizon Interceptor
- Complement: 4 officers, 20 crew
- Sensors & processing systems: L-3 C4ISR suite
- Armament: 1 × Mk 38 Mod 2 25 mm automatic gun; 4 × crew-served Browning M2 machine guns

USCGC Joseph Tezanos (WPC-1118) is the United States Coast Guard's 18th Sentinel-class cutter. She was commissioned on August 26, 2016. She was the sixth of the first cohort of six Fast Response Cutters home-ported in San Juan, Puerto Rico.

== Design ==
Like her sister ships, Joseph Tezanos is designed to perform search and rescue missions, port security, and the interception of smugglers. She is armed with a remotely-controlled, gyro-stabilized 25 mm autocannon, four crew served M2 Browning machine guns, and light arms. She is equipped with a stern launching ramp, that allows her to launch or retrieve a water-jet propelled high-speed auxiliary boat, without first coming to a stop. Her high-speed boat has over-the-horizon capability, and is useful for inspecting other vessels, and deploying boarding parties.

== Operational career ==
Just days before being commissioned into active service, Joseph Tezanos was the on-scene coordinator for the rescue of the burning cruise ferry Caribbean Fantasy several miles outside of San Juan harbor. Leading a flotilla of federal, territorial, commercial, and Good Samaritan vessels, the plankowner crew of Joseph Tezanos saved all 511 crewmembers and passengers from Caribbean Fantasy. This was the largest mass rescue in US waters since the Andrea Doria.

In late March 2019, Joseph Tezanos seized a large shipment of illegal drugs from a 30 feet (9.1 m) "go-fast" vessel off Loiza, Puerto Rico. Three smugglers from the Dominican Republic were seized, together with $25 million worth of cocaine, and 2 tons of marijuana, worth an additional $3.5 million.

== Namesake ==
Joseph Tezanos enlisted in the Coast Guard after the breakout of World War II, in 1942. He served as a gunner's mate aboard the Landing Ship Tank LST 20 where landings included Kiska, Alaska, Tarawa Atoll, and Kwajalein Atoll. In April 1944, while moored in Pearl Harbor the LST 20 was near a cataclysmic explosion among vessels loaded with ammunition that posed a grave risk of setting off the explosives in other vessels. Tezanos led a crew of volunteers that took a boat dangerously close to the conflagration, and rescued over forty survivors.

In 2010, Charles "Skip" W. Bowen, who was then the United States Coast Guard's most senior non-commissioned officer, proposed that the Sentinel class cutters should be named after enlisted sailors in the Coast Guard, or one of its precursor services, who were recognized for their heroism. The Coast Guard chose Tezanos as the namesake of the 18th cutter.
