= Samuel Hirsch Margulies =

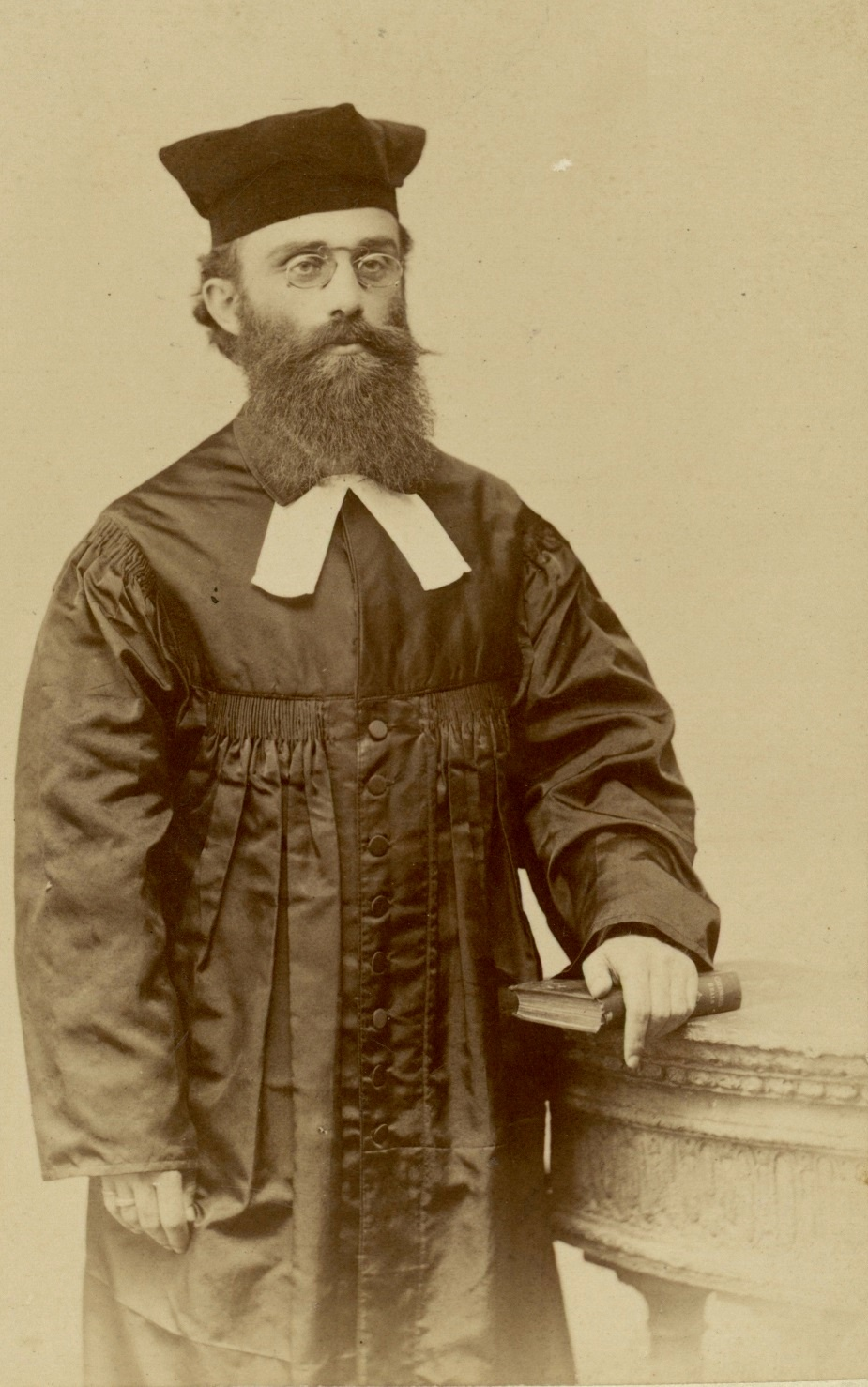

Personal life
- Born: 1858 Berezhany, Kingdom of Galicia and Lodomeria
- Died: March 12, 1922 (aged 63–64) Florence, Italy

Religious life
- Religion: Judaism

Samuel Hirsch Margulies (1858 – March 12, 1922) was an Orthodox rabbi and scholar. He was born in Berezhany, western Ukraine (then mainly Polish speaking town with mixed Polish, Ukrainian and Jewish population in the Kingdom of Galicia and Lodomeria of the Austro-Hungarian Empire), and studied at the Breslau Jewish Theological Seminary and at the universities of Breslau and Leipzig, in Germany. He was rabbi in Hamburg (1885–1887), district rabbi of Hesse-Nassau, Germany, (1887–1890), and he was appointed chief rabbi of Florence, Italy in 1890. In 1899, he became principal of Italy’s only rabbinical seminary, the Collegio Rabbinico Italiano when it transferred from Rome to Florence. Margulies was a powerful spiritual force in Italy and trained many of its religious leaders. He founded and edited Rivista Israelitica, the learned journal published by the Seminary. His scholarly publications included an edition of Rabbi Saadiah’s Arabic translation of the Psalms.

== Impact on Italian Jewry ==
As rector of Italian Rabbinical Seminary (where he had been the Rabbi for more than three decades), Samuel Hirsch Margulies left a strong footprint on the life and culture of Italian Jews. Margulies was of Polish (East Galicia, current western Ukraine) origin. As rabbi of Florence (from 1890) he managed to become the leader of all Italian Jewry. He became the spiritual leader in all the spheres of civic life, on account of his deep Judaic knowledge, organisational abilities and personal favourite pursuits in the subjects of spirit and heart. Thanks to him, the indifferent religious life of Italian Jews started to be a live artery filled with strong native Jewish traditions and culture. He initiated the centralized unification of all Jewish communities that resulted in creation of a new Collegio Rabbinico Italiano in Florence. This seminary produced an array of young Rabbis, who started the spiritual renaissance of Italian Jewry.

One of his students, rabbi Umberto Cassuto, went on to teach in Italian universities, and in the wake of the Italian racial laws, accepted an invitation to chair the department of Biblical studies for Hebrew University of Jerusalem, becoming a notable scholar of Hebrew and Ugaritic literature and Italian history

== Bibliography ==
- MARGULIES, Samuel Hirsch. Saadi al-Fajűmî's arabische Psalmenübersetzung ... Pp. iv, 51 [26]. Breslau: Druck von Grass, Barth und comp., 1884.
