= Ballarat Junior Technical School =

Division of the Ballarat School of Mines, Australia

- Other names: Ballarat School of Mines
- Former names: Ballarat School of Mines; Ballarat Junior Technical School
- Type: Public
- Established: 1913
- Parent institution: Ballarat School of Mines
- Location: Main campus, Lydiard Street South, Ballarat, Victoria, Australia; 37.626°S 143.891°E
- Language: English

The Ballarat Junior Technical School was a junior division of the Ballarat School of Mines. It opened in 1913 in a bluestone building in the grounds of Dana Street Primary School. In 1921 it moved to a custom built school in the grounds of the Ballarat School of Mines.

The Ballarat Junior Technical School is a predecessor institution of Federation University Australia.

== Notable alumni ==
- Dave McGrath (footballer, born 1899)

== See also ==
- Federation University Australia
