= Margaretta Salinger =

American art historian (1907 – 1985

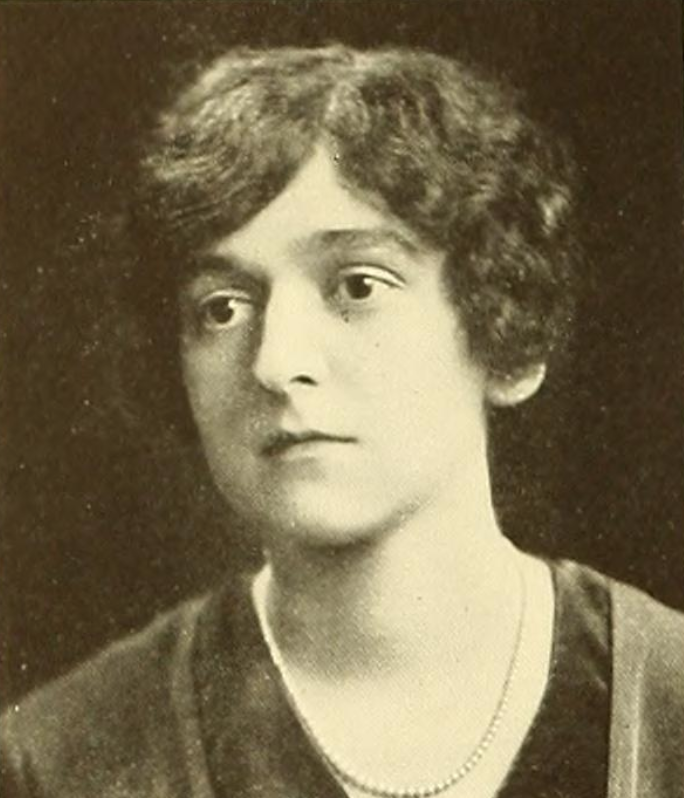
- Margaretta Salinger, from the 1928 yearbook of Bryn Mawr College
- Born: March 22, 1907; New York City
- Died: March 8, 1985 (age 77); New Britain, Connecticut, U.S.
- Occupations: Art historian, curator

Margaretta M. Salinger (March 22, 1907 – March 8, 1985) was an American art historian. She was curator of the Department of European Paintings at the Metropolitan Museum of Art.

== Early life and education ==
Salinger was born in New York City, the daughter of Arthur A. Salinger and Adaline Sager Magill Salinger. Her father was a veterinarian. She graduated from Bryn Mawr College in 1928.

== Career ==
Salinger became a cataloguer at the Metropolitan Museum of Art in 1928. She was a researcher, lecturer and writer for the museum for many years. She gave a popular series of free lectures on art appreciation at the museum in the 1950s, and traveled giving lectures in other cities. She chaired the boards of the museum's Scientific Publication Committee, and Editorial Advisory Committee. She was named a curator in 1970, a few years before she retired in 1972.

== Publications ==
A colleague wrote in 1986 that, "In all of her work, whether spoken or written, Margaretta Salinger strove to express her perceptive ideas with precision and grace." She frequently contributed essays to the Bulletin of the Metropolitan Museum of Art.

- "Piazzetta's Drawing of a Shepherd Boy" (1937)
- "Christ and the Woman of Samaria by Caracciolo" (1937)
- "The Whitsun-Bride by Pieter Brueghel the Younger" (1939)
- A Catalogue of Early Flemish, Dutch and German Painting in the Metropolitan Museum of Art (1947, with Harry B. Wehle)
- "Representations of Saint Teresa" (1949)
- The Flower Piece in European Painting (1949)
- Vincent Van Gogh (1952)
- Masterpieces of French Paintings (Fifteenth to Mid-Nineteenth Centuries) (1955)
- Diego Velazquez, 1599-1660 (1956)
- Michelangelo's The Last Judgment (1963)
- French Painting of the 19th and 20th Centuries in the Metropolitan Museum of Art (1966 and 1967, with Charles Sterling)
- Impressionists in the Metropolitan (1968)
- Masterpieces of American Painting in The Metropolitan Museum of Art (1986, published posthumously)

== Personal life ==
Salinger died in 1985, at the age of 77, in New Britain, Connecticut. There is a collection of her papers in the Metropolitan Museum of Art archives.
