= Jock O'Brien (footballer, born 1909) =

Australian rules footballer, born 1909

Personal information
- Full name: Jock O'Brien
- Born: 24 January 1909
- Died: 14 March 1985 (aged 76)
- Original team: Williamstown

Playing career^{1}
| Years | Club | Games (Goals) |
| 1932–1934 | Essendon | 22 (12) |
- ^{1} Playing statistics correct to the end of 1934.

Jock O'Brien (24 January 1909 – 14 March 1985) was an Australian rules footballer who played with Essendon in the Victorian Football League (VFL).

O'Brien played his junior football for Essendon but was recruited from Williamstown. He was used as wingman and rover. He won the award for Essendon's "best first year player" in 1932 but after two more seasons had to retire, due to work commitments.

He was the elder brother of North Melbourne captain Dally O'Brien.
