= William Bailey (Royal Navy officer) =

Lieutenant-Commander William Bailey CBE DSC GM & Bar
- Born: 11 May 1918; Santos-o-Velho, Portugal
- Died: 11 March 1985 (aged 66); Lisbon, Portugal
- Military career
- Allegiance: United Kingdom
- Branch: Royal Navy
- Service years: 1940–1947
- Rank: Lieutenant-Commander
- Commands: HMS Prospects Ahead; Naval Party 1574
- Conflicts: Second World War
- Awards: Commander of the Order of the British Empire; Distinguished Service Cross; George Medal & Bar
- Other work: Businessman

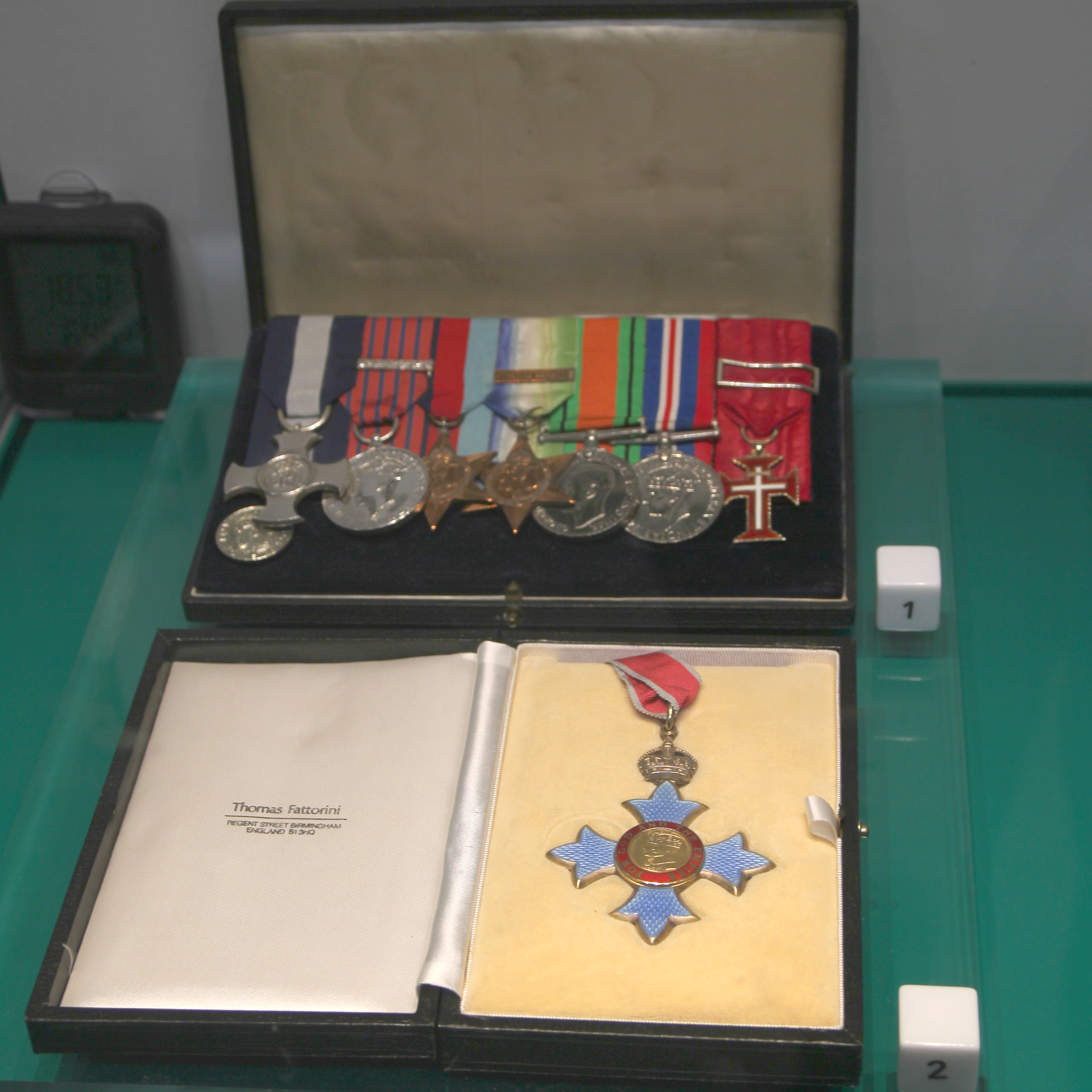
Medals awarded to William Bailey

William Bailey (11 May 1918 – 11 March 1985) was a Royal Navy Volunteer Reserve officer and businessman, who was twice awarded the George Medal for his work as a clearance diver during the Second World War.

== Early life ==
Bailey was born to British parents in Santos-o-Velho, Portugal, where his father worked as a mechanical engineer. He was educated at Oporto British School and Highgate School. He qualified as an electrical engineer from Faraday House Electrical Engineering College in 1940, and joined the Royal Navy Volunteer Reserve immediately afterwards.

== Military service ==
He received a commission as a temporary electrical sub-lieutenant, and after training took command of an armed mine trawler, HMS Prospects Ahead. Bailey subsequently undertook mine sweeping patrols in the North Sea. In September 1941 he was trained as a helmeted diver and deployed to Gibraltar as Senior Diving Officer. Based on HMS Cormorant, he had responsibility for defusing enemy underwater mines attached to Allied ships. On 29 December 1942 he was awarded the George Medal for "gallantry and undaunted devotion to duty" while defusing shipping mines in the western Mediterranean.

In early 1944 Bailey was given command of Naval Party 1574. The team was tasked with the D-Day objective of clearing the harbour basin at Ouistreham of mines, and to ensure operation of the lock gates that gave access to the Canal de Caen à la Mer. The mission was successfully executed, and on 13 March 1945 Bailey was awarded the Distinguished Service Cross in connection to his service during Operation Overlord. He continued to work as a mine disposal expert, and was awarded a Bar to his George Medal on 15 May 1945 for mine recovery work in France and the Low Countries between D-Day and the end of the war. He was promoted to lieutenant commander in March 1945. In 1947 he was discharged from further service in the Royal Navy; having survived several underwater explosions he was suffering from a duodenal ulcer and nerve deafness.

== Business career ==
In 1949 Bailey returned to Portugal as Assistant Representative for the Metropolitan Vickers Export Company. That year he was called up for military service in Portugal, but exempted due to his wartime injuries. He later became managing director of the Caima Pulp Company, and was twice chairman of the British Chambers of Commerce. He became a key figure in the British community in Lisbon and was appointed an Officer of the Order of the British Empire in the 1960 New Year Honours. On 12 June 1982 he was advanced to Commander of the Order of the British Empire for services to British commercial interests in Portugal.

== Personal life ==
Bailey married Joan Mary Gorddard in London in November 1944.

He died in Portugal at the age of 66. His obituary in The Times was written by his close friend, Jock Colville.
