= Hugh Hibbert =

English cricketer

Hugh Washington Hibbert (4 October 1911 – 12 March 1985) was an English cricketer who played for Northamptonshire. He was born in Kensington and died in Salisbury.

Hibbert made a single first-class appearance, during the 1931 season, against Essex. Coming in the middle order, he scored ten runs in the first and one run in the second innings in which he batted. He took one catch. Northamptonshire won the match by 3 wickets, however Hibbert never played for Northamptonshire again.
