= Oskar Ritter (footballer) =

German footballer

Personal information
- Date of birth: 30 September 1901
- Date of death: 5 March 1985 (aged 83)
- Position: Forward

Senior career*
| Years | Team | Apps | (Gls) |
- Holstein Kiel

International career
| 1925 | Germany | 1 | (0) |
- * Club domestic league appearances and goals

Oskar Ritter (30 September 1901 – 5 March 1985) was a German international footballer.
