= Karel Zouhar =

Czech pilot

Karel Zouhar (21 January 1917, Rudice – 14 March 1985) was a Czech World War II pilot. He was a Flight Lieutenant in the Royal Air Force during World War II.

== Awards and decorations ==
- Czechoslovak War Cross 1939-1945
