= Billy Lynch (Australian footballer) =

Australian rules footballer

Personal information
- Full name: William Mayson Lynch
- Born: 14 April 1909; Kensington, Victoria
- Died: 21 March 1985 (aged 75); Ivanhoe, Victoria
- Height: 188 cm (6 ft 2 in)
- Weight: 84 kg (185 lb)
- Position: Defence / Follower

Playing career^{1}
Years	Club	Games (Goals)
1927–1929	North Melbourne	36 (4)
1930–1931	Essendon	18 (1)
Total		54 (5)
- ^{1} Playing statistics correct to the end of 1931.

William Mayson Lynch (14 April 1909 – 21 March 1985) was an Australian rules footballer who played with North Melbourne and Essendon in the Victorian Football League (VFL).
