= Cairo Dixon =

Australian rules footballer, born 1911

Personal information
- Full name: Cairo Merlyn David Dixon
- Born: 4 February 1911
- Died: 19 March 1985 (aged 74)
- Original team: Coburg
- Height: 182 cm (6 ft 0 in)
- Weight: 77 kg (170 lb)

Playing career^{1}
Years	Club	Games (Goals)
1935–36	North Melbourne	18 (0)
- ^{1} Playing statistics correct to the end of 1936.

Cairo Merlyn David Dixon (4 February 1911 – 19 March 1985) was an Australian rules footballer who played with North Melbourne in the Victorian Football League (VFL).

He came to Williamstown in the VFA from the Peninsula Association in 1930 and played until round 4 of 1934, when he was cleared to Coburg. Dixon won Coburg's best and fairest award in 1934 and also played in the losing grand final of that season. He also played with Shepparton for part of 1932. He played 29 games and kicked 15 goals for Williamstown and was suspended by the VFA several times during his time with the Seagulls. He was banned for 8 matches in 1931 as a result of being found guilty of striking a Preston player in the round 6 game at Preston, and received another 8 weeks suspension for striking a Coburg player at Williamstown in round 4 of 1933. He was reported another three times after returning to the field in 1933 and eventually suspended for a further two weeks following the round 17 match with Brighton at Elsternwick Park.

He transferred to North Melbourne from Coburg early in 1935 and played 18 games before returning to Coburg in 1936. Dixon then went to Eaglehawk half-way through the 1937 season but returned to Coburg in 1938 to complete 56 games and kick 45 goals for the 'Burgers. Dixon captain-coached Kew Football Club to runners-up against South Districts in the Melbourne Sub-Districts Football League in 1939, played on the MCG. He attempted a comeback to the VFA in 1945 with Camberwell at the age of 34 but only managed 3 games, although he did kick 5 goals against Sandringham in round 5 and was named in the best players but was in the Seconds two weeks later.
