= Kamraj Kesari =

Indian cricketer

Personal information
- Full name: Kamraj P. Kesari
- Born: 24 October 1922; Nagpur, Central Provinces and Berar, British India
- Died: 26 March 1985 (aged 62); Nagpur, Maharashtra, India
- Batting: Right-handed
- Bowling: Right-arm off-spin

Career statistics
Competition	First-class
Matches	33
Runs scored	1307
Batting average	25.13
100s/50s	1/7
Top score	142
Balls bowled	3584
Wickets	58
Bowling average	24.43
5 wickets in innings	4
10 wickets in match	0
Best bowling	7/55
Catches/stumpings	17/–
- Source: CricketArchive, 17 September 2017

Kamraj Kesari (24 October 1922 – 26 March 1985) was an Indian cricketer who played 33 matches of first-class cricket for several teams in India from 1941 to 1959.

A middle-order batsman and right-arm off-spin bowler, Kesari took 7 for 55 and 2 for 41 for Gujarat when they lost by three runs to Western India in the Ranji Trophy in 1945–46. He took 6 for 62 and scored 142, his only first-class century, for Central Provinces and Berar in a drawn match against Holkar in the 1948–49 Ranji Trophy.
