= Dave McGrath (footballer, born 1899) =

Australian rules footballer

Personal information
- Full name: David Gullan McGrath
- Born: 11 March 1899; Allendale, Victoria
- Died: 5 March 1985 (aged 85); Kew, Victoria
- Height: 175 cm (5 ft 9 in)
- Weight: 86 kg (190 lb)

Playing career^{1}
| Years | Club | Games (Goals) |
| 1920 | Fitzroy | 10 (6) |
- ^{1} Playing statistics correct to the end of 1920.

David Gullan McGrath (11 March 1899 – 5 March 1985) was an Australian rules footballer who played with Fitzroy in the Victorian Football League (VFL).

Dave McGrath was educated at the Ballarat Junior Technical School and the Ballarat School of Mines. He was a member of the successful Ballarat School of Mines Athletics Team when they won the inaugural Herald Shield for Athletics competition between Victorian Technical Schools.
