= Leslie Nelson Shaw =

American postmaster and businessman

- Born: August 2, 1922; Columbus, Ohio, U.S.
- Died: March 10, 1985 (aged 62); Los Angeles, California, U.S.
- Occupations: Postmaster, Savings and loans, civic leader
- Known for: First African American Postmaster of a major U.S. city, advocate for African American civil rights and affordable housing, leader in the Democratic Party

Leslie N. Shaw Sr. (August 2, 1922 – March 10, 1985) was the first African American to serve as Postmaster of Los Angeles, and of any major city in the United States. Shaw achieved success in the Savings and Loan Industry in Los Angeles and was a well-respected fundraiser for the Democratic Party, serving as a member of the Finance Committee for the Kennedy-Johnson campaign leading to the 1960 United States presidential election and as the Treasurer of the President Kennedy Dinner Committee in 1961. Shaw was a civic leader who led a job-training program as the appointed President of the Private Industry Council and served on the boards of the Braille Institute of America, the Los Angeles National Urban League, public television station KCET, Lockheed Corporation, and United Way.

== Biography ==
Leslie Nelson Shaw Sr. was born in Columbus, Ohio. He attended Ohio State University and graduated in 1949 with a degree in business. Shaw also fought in Italy during WWII and was awarded a Bronze Star Medal for bravery. He married Ann Shaw (social worker) in 1947, a family friend and classmate at Ohio State University. Leslie and Ann moved to Los Angeles, where Leslie worked in the savings and loans industry. His first position was as a teller at Watts Savings and Loans, which later became Family Savings and Loans where he served as Vice President. Leslie also served as a fundraiser for the Democratic Party. In 1958, he worked on the Governor Pat Brown campaign and for the John F. Kennedy and Lyndon B. Johnson presidential campaign in 1960. He went on to serve on the party’s state finance committee and the Democratic national finance committee for Southern California, raising money as the treasurer of the President Kennedy dinner, appointed by Attorney General Stanley Mosk.

In 1963, President Kennedy appointed Leslie as the Postmaster of Los Angeles, making him the first African American to serve as Postmaster of any major city in the United States. In that role, he was responsible for operation of the third largest post office in the United States.

Leslie left his role as Postmaster in 1969 to be the Vice President of Great Western Savings and Loans (later Great Western Bank (1919–97) where he was the Director of Community Development and president of the subsidiary First City Savings and Loans. In 1981, he was elected president of the Savings Associations Mortgage Corporation (SAMCO) to serve a one-year term. SAMCO is a cooperative lending project in California, designed to provide loans to lower-income individuals who might not regularly qualify for a loan. That same year, Mayor Tom Bradley (American politician) selected Leslie to be president of the Private Industry Council where he directed a $35 million job-training program for lower-income participants in more than 60 programs In 1982, Leslie was appointed to the 1982 Urban Affairs Committee of the United States League of Savings Associations.

In addition to those positions, Leslie served on the boards of the Rotary Club, the Braille Institute of America, Los Angeles National Urban League, public television station KCET, Lockheed Corporation, and United Way. In 1976, a park at 2250 W. Jefferson Blvd was renamed Leslie N. Shaw Park in recognition of Leslie’s efforts to acquire the site and revitalize it through his position at Great Western. After his death, Congressman Mervyn Dymally introduced a bill to name a new Los Angeles postal facility after Leslie N. Shaw. The legislation was cosponsored by Congressmen Augustus Hawkins and Julian Dixon, Congressional Black Caucus Chairman Mickey Leland, and Post Office and Civil Service Committee member Rep. William Clay.

Leslie died in 1985 in Los Angeles at the age of 62.
