= Max Cross =

Australian rules footballer

Personal information
- Full name: Max Cross
- Born: 11 July 1934
- Died: 7 March 1985 (aged 50)
- Original team: Parkside
- Height: 182 cm (6 ft 0 in)
- Weight: 76 kg (168 lb)

Playing career^{1}
Years	Club	Games (Goals)
1956–1957	Footscray	21 (54)
- ^{1} Playing statistics correct to the end of 1957.

Max Cross (11 July 1934 – 7 March 1985) was an Australian rules footballer who played with Footscray in the Victorian Football League (VFL).

Cross, a Parkside recruit, was Footscray leading goal-kicker in the 1956 VFL season, his first. He didn't come into the team until round five and on debut kicked five goals, against South Melbourne. His season tally of 52 goals included six in the finals series, four of them in Footscray's semi final win over Geelong. Only St Kilda's Bill Young kicked more goals in the VFL that year, with only four more goals than Cross. After falling out of favour early in the 1957 season, Cross applied for a transfer to Bena, but it was refused by Footscray. He went on to play five games that year.
