= Rudice (Blansko District) =

- Municipality
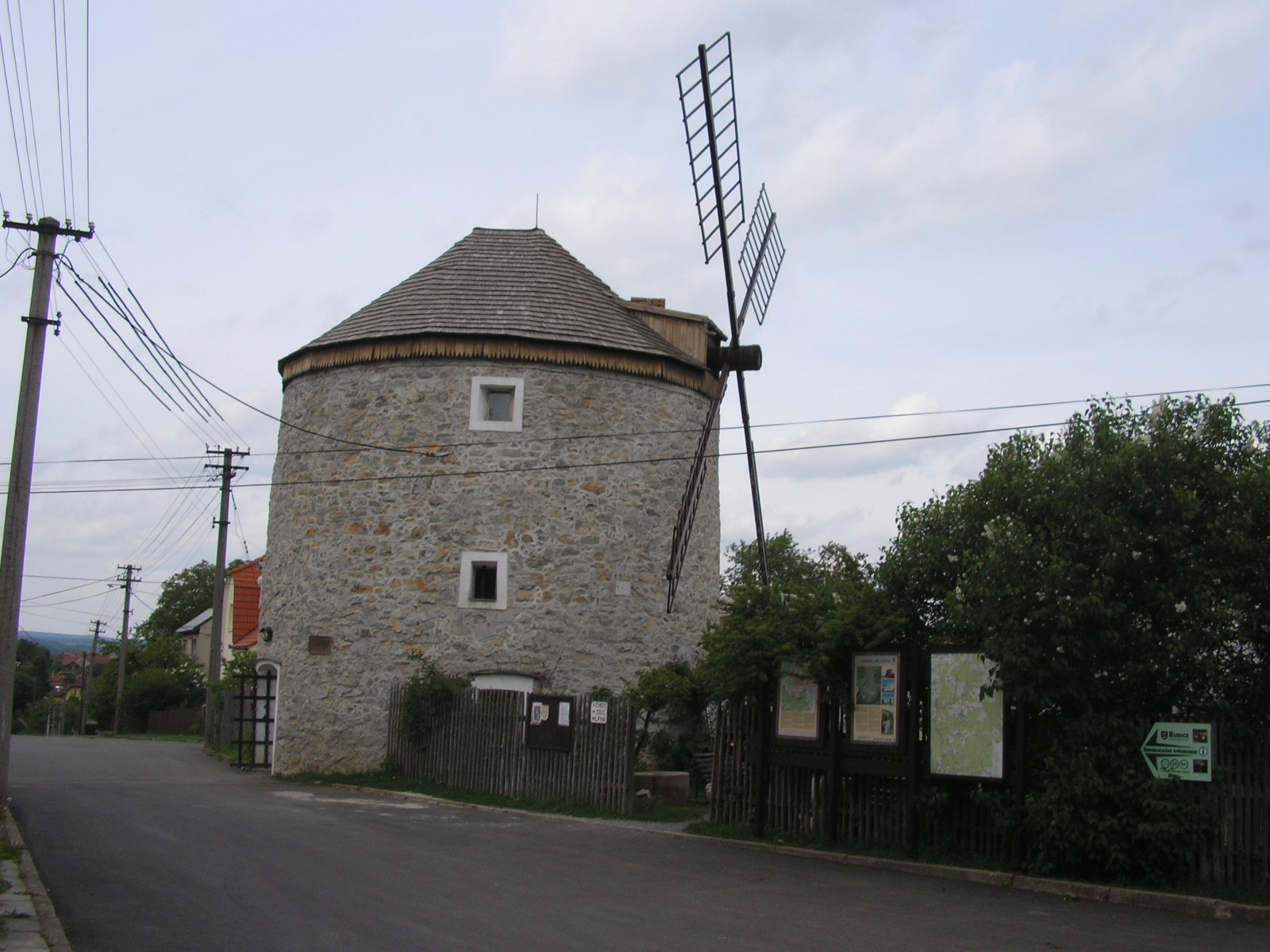
- Windmill in Rudice

- Flag Coat of arms

- Location in the Czech Republic
- Coordinates: 49°20′14″N 16°43′33″E
- Country: Czech Republic
- Region: South Moravian
- District: Blansko
- First mentioned: 1247

Area
  - Total: 4.96 km^{2} (1.92 sq mi)
- Elevation: 490 m (1,610 ft)

Population (2026-01-01)
  - Total: 978
  - Density: 197/km^{2} (511/sq mi)
- Time zone: UTC+1 (CET)
  - Summer (DST): UTC+2 (CEST)
- Postal code: 679 06
- Website: www.rudice.cz

Rudice is a municipality and village in Blansko District in the South Moravian Region of the Czech Republic. It has about 1,000 inhabitants.

Rudice lies approximately 7 kilometres (4 mi) south-east of Blansko, 17 km (11 mi) north-east of Brno, and 186 km (116 mi) south-east of Prague.

== Demographics ==
Historical population
Year	Pop.	±%
1869	687	—
1880	773	+12.5%
1890	843	+9.1%
1900	887	+5.2%
1910	1,001	+12.9%
1921	1,010	+0.9%
1930	918	−9.1%
1950	947	+3.2%
1961	998	+5.4%
1970	938	−6.0%
1980	882	−6.0%
1991	793	−10.1%
2001	824	+3.9%
2011	903	+9.6%
2021	961	+6.4%
Source: Censuses

== Notable people ==
- Karel Zouhar (1917–1985), fighter pilot
