= Innokenti Gerasimov =

Soviet soil scientist and geographer (1905–1985)

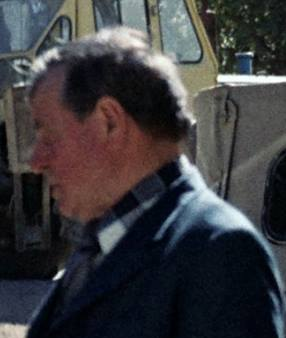
- 1978
- Born: December 9, 1905
- Died: March 30, 1985 (aged 79); Moscow
- Scientific career
- Fields: Geography; Pedology

Innokenti Petrovich Gerasimov (Russian: Герасимов, Иннокентий Петрович; 9 December 1905, in Kostroma – 30 March 1985, in Moscow) was a Soviet geographer and pedologist, professor, academician of the Soviet Academy of Sciences (1953). He was a creator of "constructive geography" – a new scientific direction, which was focused on the problems of conservation and using nature. According to him, constructive geography was formed in the era of the scientific and technological revolution, when geographical science had more complicated tasks, which should cover activity of many branches of the economy and change of many components of nature and society in the territory of very extensive and various regions.

== Biography ==
He graduated from Leningrad State University (1926). Gerasimov participated in expeditions to Kazakhstan, Middle Asia, Western Siberia, on Ural, Far East and other. He traveled to Western Europe, India, China, Japan, Ceylon, Senegal, Algeria, Tunisia, Morocco, Guinea, Brazil, Chile, Uruguay, United States, Mexico, New Zealand, Australia.

Gerasimov also was known for his work in geomorphology, the study of the earth's surface relief.

As the director of the Institute of Geography since 1951, he directed research used in planning regional development projects and the building of towns and railroads.

In 1964 he was elected a Member of the German Academy of Sciences Leopoldina.

He was honored with an Order of Lenin and the State Prize of the USSR in 1973.

== Research ==
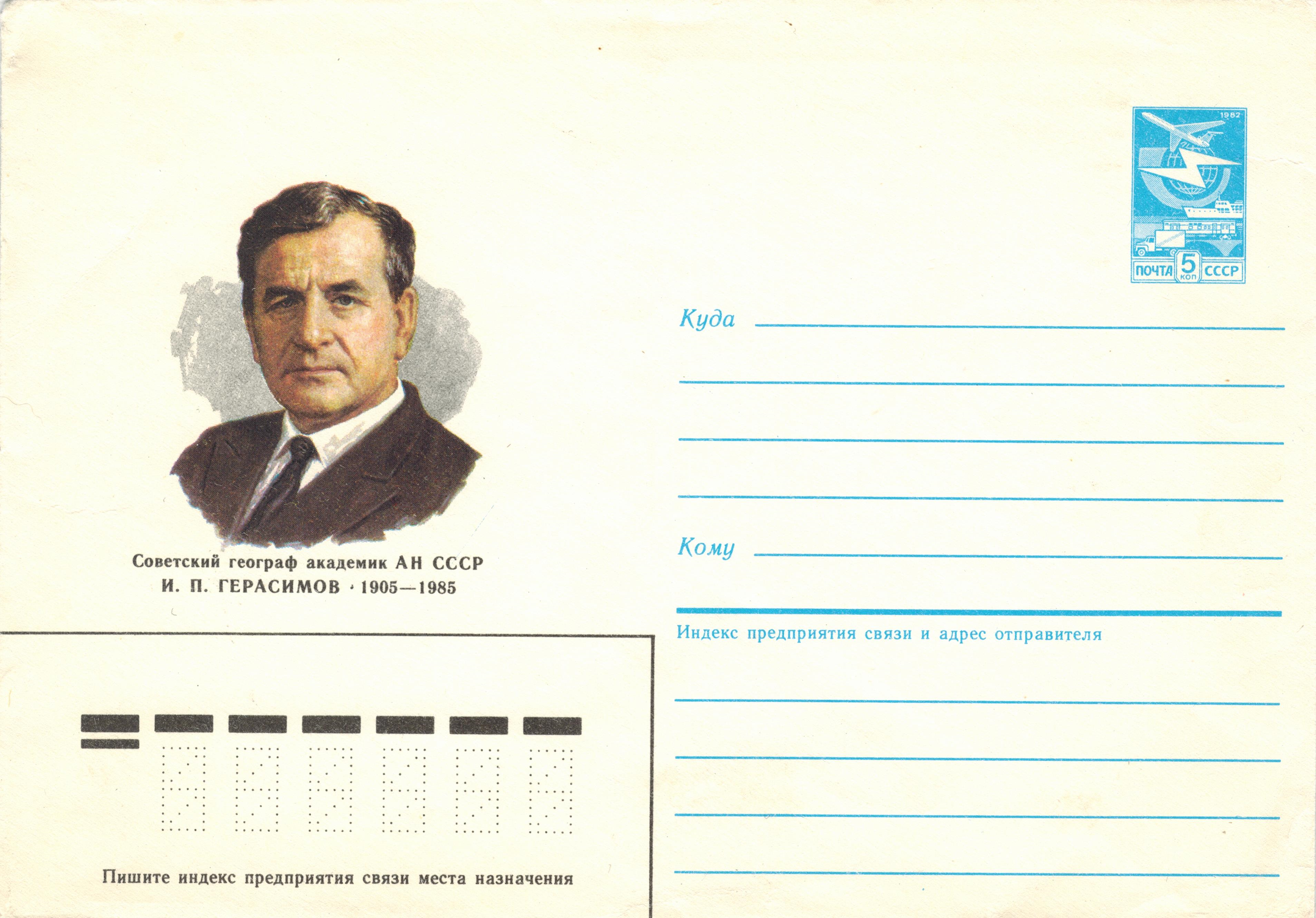

Innokenti Gerasimov was known as the specialist in conservation and changing the natural environment.

On the need of environmental protection, Innokentiy Gerasimov had spoken at a meeting of the Department of Earth Sciences, Soviet Academy of Sciences, on February 16, 1965. He has discussed the anthropogenic influence of paper industries on an ecosystem of Lake Baikal. In his report, there was an alarming warning about the increase of industrial and domestic wastewaters from 11 to 60 km3 per year for 20 years. Taking into account the need for dilution and subsequent self-cleaning of 5–10 times the amount of clean water meant a threat of an acute water crisis in especially important industrial regions of the country.

Innokentiy Gerasimov was supporters of the idea of Soviet ecologist Stanislav Shwarts, that the industrial needs of the Soviet Union made impossible the total preservation of its natural environment. According to him the Natural Environment should be modified by humans to provide all people's needs and the nature reserves (zapovedniki) should keep untouched environment.

== Books and articles ==
- Armand D., Gerasimov I., Preobrazhensky V. Prognostication and geographical science // Geographical prognostication: problems and prospects. Moscow, 1986. Pp. 23–30.
- Gerasimov I.P., Gindin A.M. The problem of transferring runoff from Northern and Siberian rivers to the arid regions of the European USSR, Soviet Central Asia and Kazakhstan // Environmental effects of complex river development. Boulder, 1977. P. 59-70.
- Gerasimov I. P. A Soviet plan for nature // Natural History. 1969. Vol. 78. N 10. P. 24-35.
- Структурные черты рельефа земной поверхности на территории СССР и их происхождение, М., 1959;
- Преобразование природы и развитие географической науки в СССР, М., 1967.

== Literature ==
- Sobisevich A. V., Snytko V. A. Some aspects of nature protection in the scientific heritage of academician Innokentiy Gerasimov // Acta Geographica Silesiana. 2018. Vol. 29. # 1. P. 55–60.
