= Percy Hunt =

Australian rules footballer

Personal information
- Full name: Percy Stanley Hunt
- Born: 12 November 1922; Numurkah, Victoria
- Died: 9 March 1985 (aged 62); Highton, Victoria
- Original team: Ballarat
- Height: 178 cm (5 ft 10 in)
- Weight: 66 kg (146 lb)
- Position: Utility

Playing career^{1}
Years	Club	Games (Goals)
1945–50	Geelong	112 (35)
- ^{1} Playing statistics correct to the end of 1950.

Percy Stanley Hunt (12 November 1922 – 9 March 1985) was an Australian rules footballer who played with Geelong in the Victorian Football League (VFL).

Prior to his VFL career, he served in the Australian Army in World War II.
