= Jim Whelan (footballer) =

Australian rules footballer

Personal information
- Full name: James Whelan
- Born: 24 December 1871; Sunbury, Victoria
- Died: 30 June 1949 (aged 77); Carnegie, Victoria

Playing career^{1}
Years	Club	Games (Goals)
1897	Fitzroy	2 (0)
- ^{1} Playing statistics correct to the end of 1897.

James Whelan (24 December 1871 – 30 June 1949) was an Australian rules footballer who played with Fitzroy in the Victorian Football League.
