= Rudice (Uherské Hradiště District) =

- Municipality
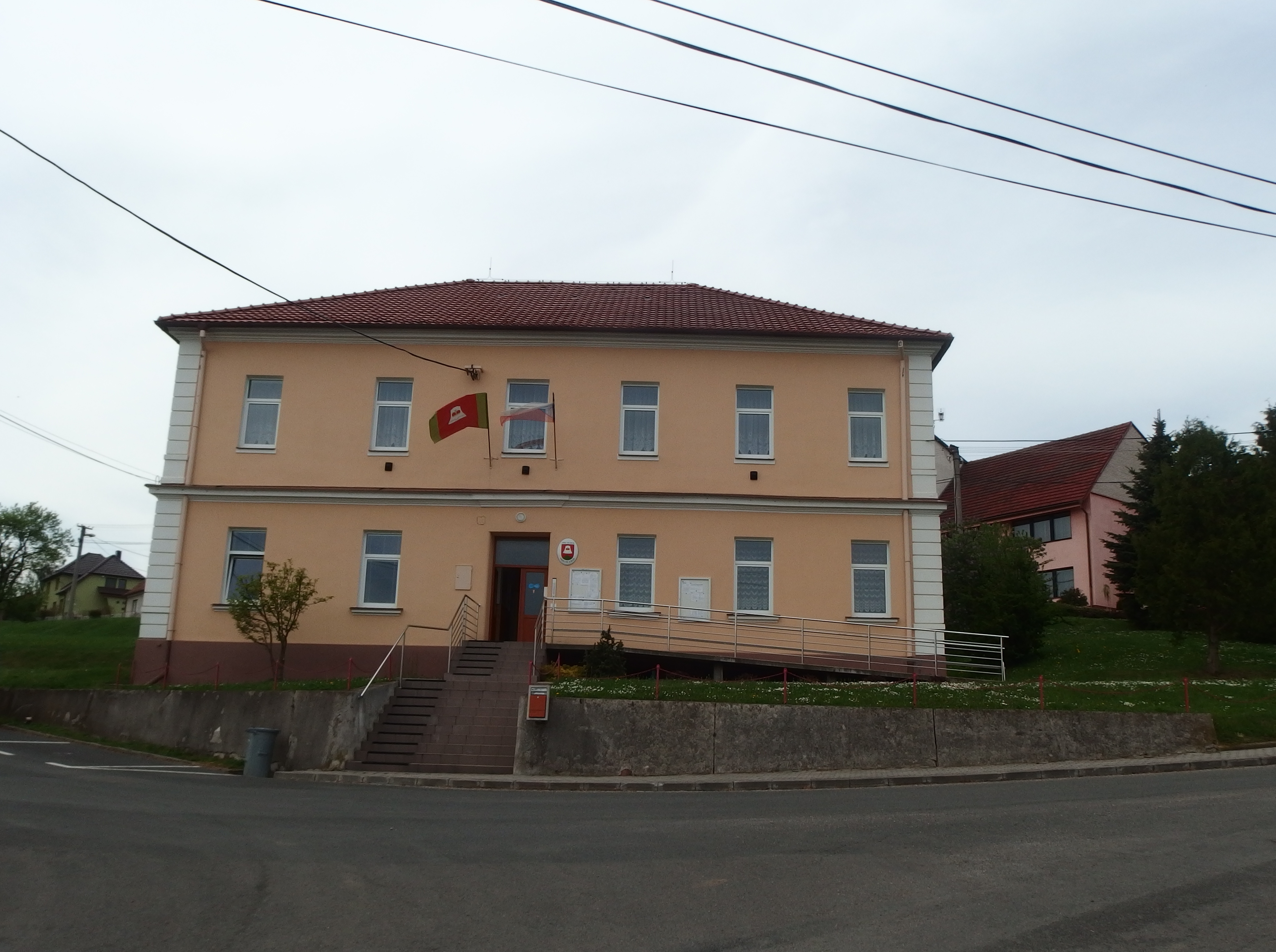
- Municipal office

- Flag Coat of arms

- Location in the Czech Republic
- Coordinates: 49°3′22″N 17°44′15″E
- Country: Czech Republic
- Region: Zlín
- District: Uherské Hradiště
- First mentioned: 1350

Area
  - Total: 7.67 km^{2} (2.96 sq mi)
- Elevation: 296 m (971 ft)

Population (2026-01-01)
  - Total: 420
  - Density: 55/km^{2} (140/sq mi)
- Time zone: UTC+1 (CET)
  - Summer (DST): UTC+2 (CEST)
- Postal code: 687 32
- Website: www.obec-rudice.cz

Rudice is a municipality and village in Uherské Hradiště District in the Zlín Region of the Czech Republic. It has about 400 inhabitants.

Rudice lies approximately 21 kilometres (13 mi) east of Uherské Hradiště, 21 km (13 mi) south of Zlín, and 266 km (165 mi) south-east of Prague.

== Demographics ==
Historical population
Year	Pop.	±%
1869	389	—
1880	439	+12.9%
1890	494	+12.5%
1900	585	+18.4%
1910	683	+16.8%
1921	679	−0.6%
1930	742	+9.3%
1950	685	−7.7%
1961	734	+7.2%
1970	688	−6.3%
1980	587	−14.7%
1991	501	−14.7%
2001	488	−2.6%
2011	433	−11.3%
2021	429	−0.9%
Source: Censuses
