= Lukas Strachan =

South African rugby union player

- Born: Lukas Cornelius Strachan; 12 September 1907 Parys, Orange River Colony
- Died: 4 March 1985 (aged 77) Pretoria, South Africa
- Height: 1.83 m (6 ft 0 in)
- Weight: 95 kg (209 lb)
- School: Parys High School

Rugby union career
- Position: Loose-forward
Amateur team(s)
Years	Team	Apps	(Points)
1925–1926	Parys RC		
1927–1945	Pretoria Police RC		
Provincial / State sides
Years	Team	Apps	(Points)
1928–1938	Transvaal	67	
1938–1944	Northern Transvaal	23	
International career
Years	Team	Apps	(Points)
1932–1938	South Africa	10	(0)

Lukas Cornelius Strachan (12 September 1907 – 4 March 1985) was a South African rugby union international.

== Career ==
Strachan was born in Parys, Orange River Colony, where he left school at the end of 1925. In September 1926 he joined the Police and in March 1927, began his training. From 1927 until 1945 he played for the Pretoria Police Club's 1st team, in a total of 432 matches and was their captain from 1932–1945.

He made his provincial debut for Transvaal in 1928 and played for the union until 1938. He was also the captain of the Transvaal team for three years. He was one of the great campaigners that Northern Transvaal must become its own Union. In 1938 the Northern Transvaal Rugby Union was founded and he was also a member of the first Northern Transvaal team ever selected.

Strachan made his test match debut for the Springboks during the 1931–32 tour of Britain and Ireland, against England at Twickenham. In 1937 he toured with the Springboks to Australia and New Zealand and played in all five test matches. Strachan's last test series was against the British Isles during the 1938 tour. He also played 28 tour matches and scored six tries in the tour matches.

After his playing days were over, he remained involved in rugby as a coach and selector. For several years he was the coach of Police and from 1946 to 1966, he served as selector of Northern Transvaal.

=== Test history ===
No.	Opponents	Results (SA 1st)	Position	Tries	Dates	Venue
1.	England	7–0	Flank		2 Jan 1932	Twickenham, London
2.	Scotland	6–3	Flank		16 Jan 1932	Murrayfield, Edinburgh
3.	Australia	9–5	Flank		26 Jun 1937	Sydney Cricket Ground, Sydney
4.	Australia	26–17	Flank		17 Jul 1937	Sydney Cricket Ground, Sydney
5.	New Zealand	7–13	Flank		14 Aug 1937	Athletic Park, Wellington
6.	New Zealand	13–6	Flank		3 Sep 1937	Lancaster Park, Christchurch
7.	New Zealand	17–6	Flank		26 Sep 1937	Eden Park, Auckland
8.	(United Kingdom) British Isles	26–12	Number 8		6 Aug 1938	Ellis Park Park, Johannesburg
9.	(United Kingdom) British Isles	19–3	Number 8		3 Sep 1938	Crusaders Ground, Port Elizabeth
10.	(United Kingdom) British Isles	16–21	Number 8		10 Sep 1938	Newlands, Cape Town

== See also ==
- List of South Africa national rugby union players – Springbok no. 224
