= Eva Morrison =

Eva Belle Morrison Abdou
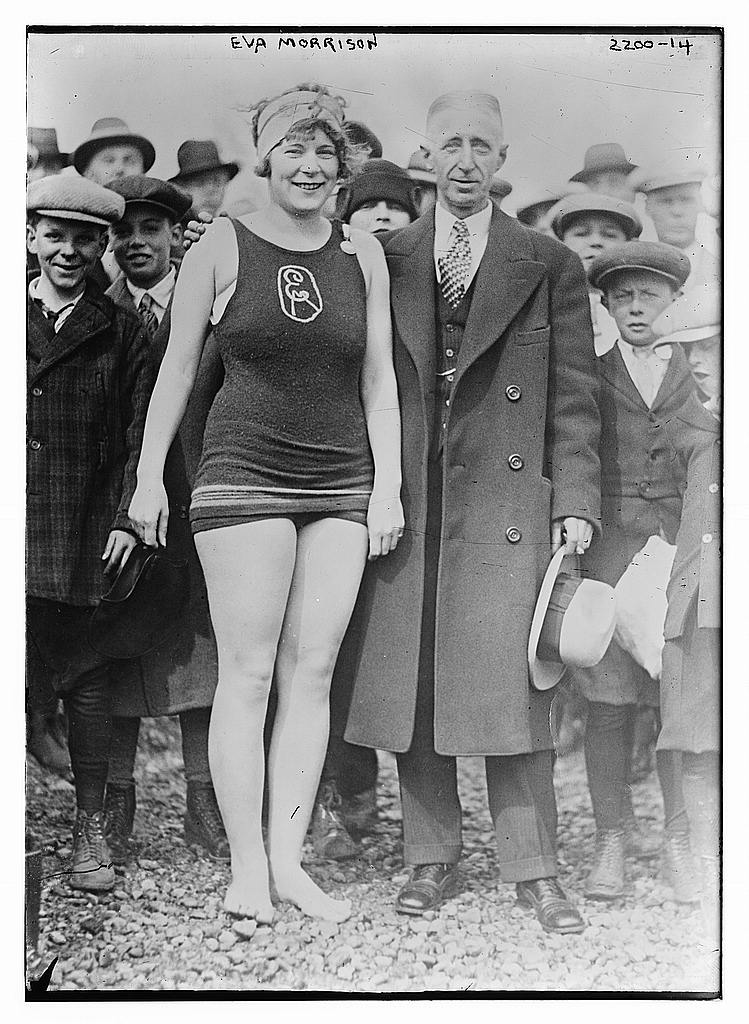
- Born: Eva Belle Morrison; March 8, 1911; Pictou, Nova Scotia
- Died: March 17, 1985 (aged 74); Brockton, Massachusetts

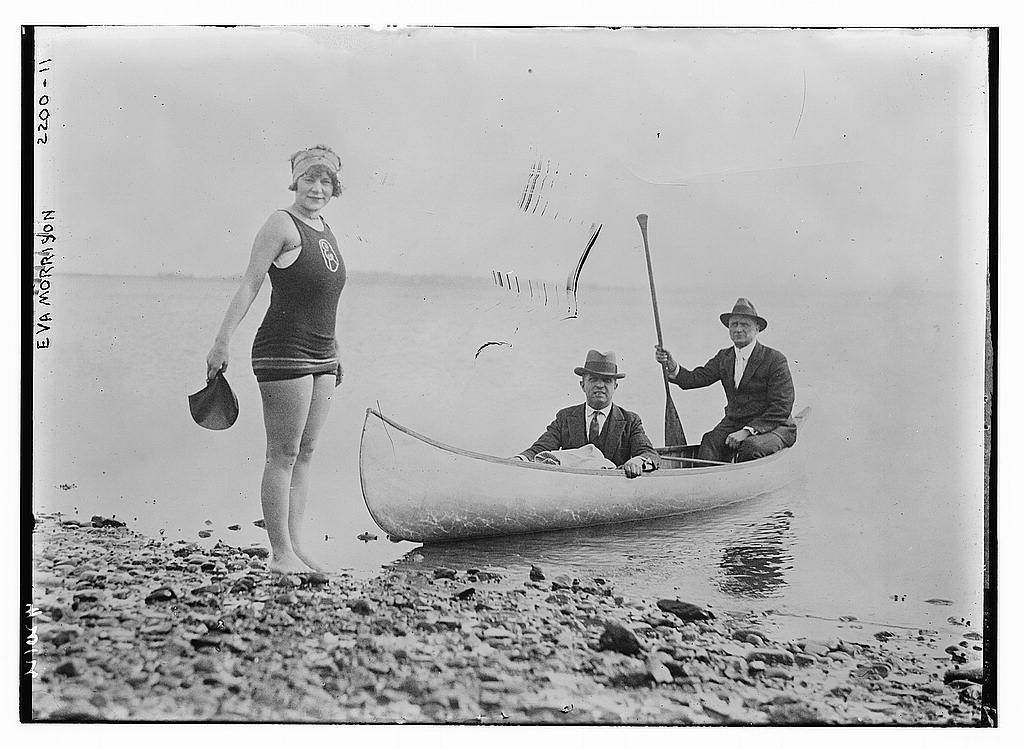
Morrison in 1935

Eva Belle Morrison Abdou (March 8, 1911 – March 17, 1985) was a Boston hospital librarian, and a long-distance swimmer who made three attempts to cross the English Channel (in 1926, 1935, and 1937), but never succeeded. She was the first woman from New England to attempt to swim the channel. She was on the Board of Governors of the International Professional Swimmers' Association.

== Early life ==
She was born on March 8, 1911, in Pictou, Nova Scotia, Canada, one of six children, having three brothers and two sisters.

She completed her first 5-mile swim in 1918. In 1926 she lost the Boston Light swim after swimming for over 7 hours in frigid water. She was the last competitor to drop out of the race.

== Violin scandal (1927) ==
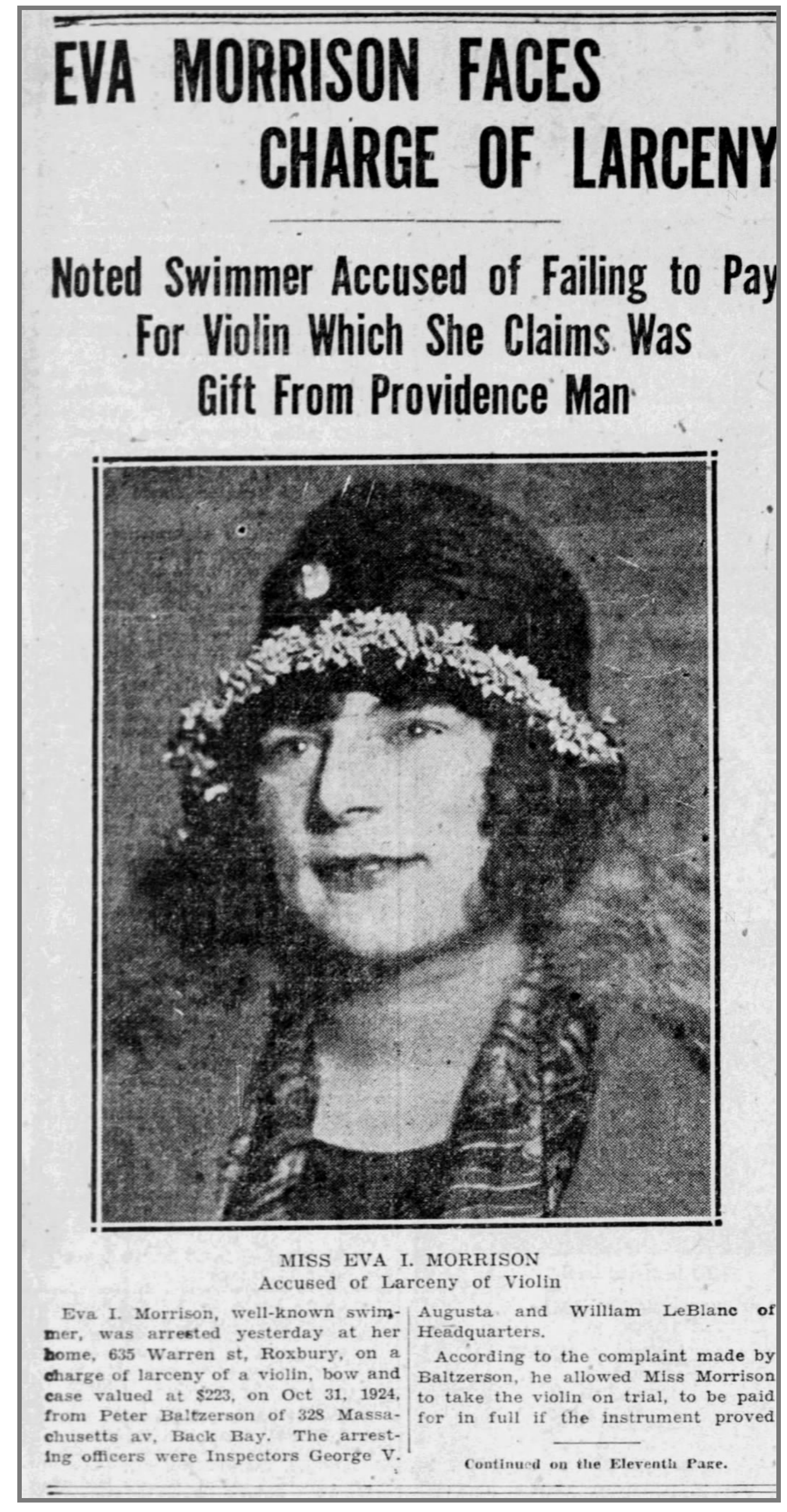
"Eva Morrison Faces Charge of Larceny"

In 1924, Boston violin maker and dealer Peter Baltzerson introduced Morrison to John Coggeshall, a wealthy Providence, Rhode Island wool merchant and antique violin collector. Baltzerson later told Morrison that Coggeshall had made her a gift of the violin — though Coggeshall had apparently arranged with Baltzerson to pay for it himself, an arrangement of which Morrison was unaware.

About a year later, after running into Coggeshall and his wife at Baltzerson's shop and learning he was married, Morrison immediately ended their friendship. Subsequently, Coggeshall never completed payment, citing business losses, and in February 1927 Baltzerson felt compelled to file a criminal complaint accusing Morrison of stealing the violin, which he had lent her "on trial."

Municipal Judge James H. Devlin acquitted her after testimony showed Baltzerson had separately pressed Coggeshall for payment.

== Later life ==
Morrison was married to Peter J. Abdou.

She was credited with saving scores of people off the Scituate Coast, near Boston, Massachusetts, when she lived there in a home on the Beach.

She first attempted to swim the English Channel unsuccessfully in 1926. She made another attempt on August 23, 1935. In one of the worst storms of the season, with the French Coast in sight, due to rough seas, she gave up after swimming for 16 hours.

Morrison swam from Charleston to Boston, Light many times and swam from Charleston to the Pemberton Shoreline in 1933.

She won the 1935 Dover Trophy with a time of 15 hours and 55 minutes for the 18-mile swim from Folkestone to Margate. On 9 October 1941 she was in a car accident in Wiscasset, Maine that killed Michael Tonely, her swimming coach and trainer. Tonely is the gentleman sitting in the middle of the boat of the accompanying Library of Congress photograph.

She died on March 17, 1985, after a long illness, in Brockton, Massachusetts at Cardinal Cushing Hospital, and was survived by her husband Peter. She was a devotee of skating, horseback riding, and golfing, and was a talented violinist. She was buried in Mount Benedict Cemetery in Roxbury, Massachusetts.
