= Vera Brown Starr =

Apache politician (1924–1985)

- Born: Vera Brown; May 23, 1924; Camp Verde Indian Reservation, Yavapai County, Arizona
- Died: March 4, 1985 (aged 60); Cottonwood, Arizona
- Other name: Vera Moreno
- Citizenship: Yavapai-Apache Nation of the Camp Verde Indian Reservation, United States
- Years active: 1975–1985
- Known for: First woman chair of the Yavapai-Apache Nation

Vera Brown Starr (May 23, 1924 – March 4, 1985) was the first woman elected as chair of the Yavapai-Apache Nation and served two years in the office, as well as serving over fifteen years on the council. She was one of the delegates to the 1977 National Women's Conference, a major U.S. women's conference held in conjunction with the International Women's Year celebrations of the United Nations. In 2012, her name was inscribed on an arch at the University of Arizona, recognizing women who were Native American leaders.

== Early life ==
Vera Brown was born on May 23, 1924, at the Indian reservation of Camp Verde, Arizona, to Mary and Sam Brown, members of the Mojave-Apache. She was the youngest of three siblings. Her father was a miner, working in the United Verde Mine near Jerome, Arizona, and the smelters in Clarkdale and Clemenceau. Until she was school age, the family lived in a wickiup near Clarkdale. She attended the segregated public school in Clarkdale, which allowed whites to attend in the mornings and Hispanics and American Indians to attend afternoon classes and though she was placed in the morning session, she remembered experiencing discrimination and did not speak English. When she was eleven, her father died on April 19, 1935, from silicosis, having worked the mines without any protective respiratory equipment. She was sent to the Valentine Indian School under the American Indian boarding school program and graduated from the Indian High School in Albuquerque, New Mexico. Though she earned a scholarship to the University of New Mexico, Brown returned to Carkdale to care for her mother because the pension her father earned had ended after one year and her mother was denied social security.

After World War II, Brown married Antonio L. Moreno (1924–1968), a veteran and miner, from Clarkdale. The couple originally made their home in Jerome, where their children Anthony Jr. (1948–2009) and Petra (1949–2011) were born. In 1949, they moved to Ajo, where Antonio worked at the Phelps-Dodge smelter.

== Tribal council career ==
In 1967, against her mother's recommendation, Moreno decided to run for a seat on the tribal council of the Yavapai-Apache Nation. After her husband's death in 1968, Moreno remarried with Henry Starr. She was successful in attaining a seat in 1969 and served for six years, before becoming the first woman to serve as the Tribal Chair in 1975. After serving two-years as Tribal Chair, the 1977 election was fraught with factionalism, causing a contested election, a court battle, and finally a new vote. Starr did not win her re-election bid as Chair.

Starr joined the North American Indian Women's Association (NAIWA), an organization formed to foster inter-tribal betterment for Native Americans. In 1977, she attended the National Women's Conference, which was held in conjunction with the United Nations' International Women's Year celebrations. As one of Arizona's four Native American delegates, of specific interest to her were the anti-discrimination resolution passed by the women which addressed minority rights, including the removal of American Indian children from their homes and tribes, as well as the discussion of the failure of Arizona to pass Medicaid legislation to provide health care to low-income families.

Though defeated in her bid for re-election to the chair, Starr continued to serve on the council, being returned in 1978 as a council member. In 1981, she was elected as treasurer of the tribe and held that post until her election as vice chair of the tribe in 1982. She returned as vice chair in 1983. Issues on which she focused during her time on the council were those that would improve the lives of tribe members. She advocated for improved housing, health care initiatives, and protection of water rights.

== Death and legacy ==
Starr died on March 4, 1985, in Cottonwood, Arizona, at the Marcus J. Lawrence Memorial Hospital. Posthumously, her name was inscribed in 2011 on the Native American Women of Arizona Arch on the University of Arizona campus, after having been selected to represent their tribe by the Yavapai-Apache Nation.

== See also ==
- List of Native American politicians
- Native American women in politics
