= Laura Guggenbühl =

American mathematician

Laura Guggenbühl (November 18, 1901 – March 8, 1985) was an American mathematician, one of the earliest women in the U.S. to earn a Ph.D. in mathematics, known for her work in triangle geometry and the history of mathematics.

== Life ==
Guggenbühl was born in New York City, to a family of Swiss immigrants; her father, a butcher and baker, died by 1920. She graduated from Hunter College in 1922 with a bachelor's degree in mathematics, after also taking some classes at Columbia University and New York University. She became an instructor at Hunter College while earning a master's degree and Ph.D. from Bryn Mawr College in 1924 and 1926 respectively. Her dissertation, supervised by Anna Johnson Pell Wheeler, was An Integral Equation with an Associated Integral Condition. She became a regular-rank faculty member at Hunter College in 1932 and retired from there as an associate professor in 1972.

She died on a round-the-world cruise, shortly after leaving Hong Kong, after being overcome with grief at the recent death of her brother.

== Contributions ==
Although not active in research mathematics after her doctorate, Guggenbühl represented Hunter College at many offerings of the International Congress of Mathematicians. She also published several works on the history of mathematics, including biographies of Henri Brocard and Karl Wilhelm Feuerbach, on elementary geometry including triangle geometry, and on the Rhind mathematical papyrus.

== Works ==
- 1927: An Integral Equation with an Associated Integral Condition from Google Books
- 1953: "Henry Brocard and the Geometry of the Triangle", Mathematical Gazette 37: 241 to 3 doi:10.2307/3610034
- 1964: "The New York Fragments of the Rhind Mathematical Papyrus", The Mathematics Teacher 57(6): 406–10 JSTOR
- 1965: "Mathematics in Ancient Egypt: A checklist (1930 to 1965)", The Mathematics Teacher 58(7): 630-34 JSTOR
- 1973: "Rereading Rhind" (book review) Isis 64: 533,4 doi:10.1086/351182
