= Joseph Tezanos =

United States Coast Guard officer and businessman

Joseph (José) Tezanos
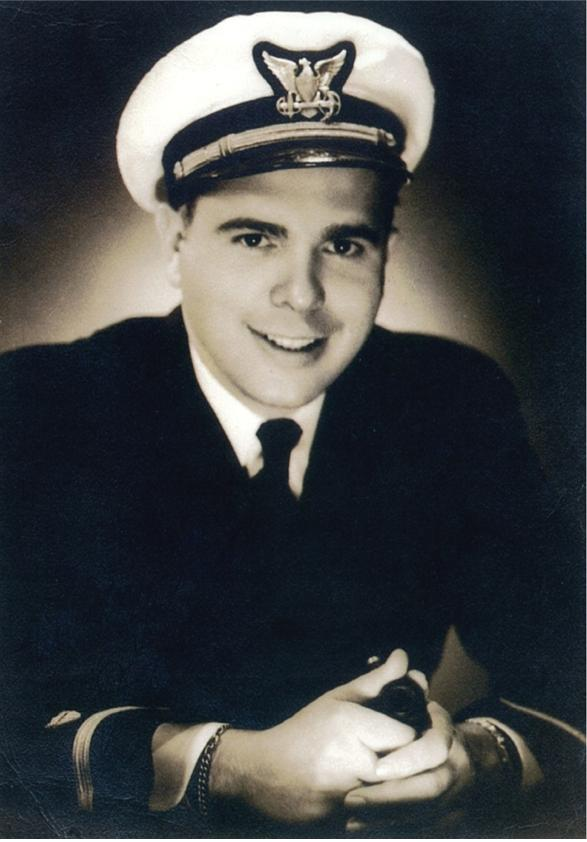
- Joseph Tezanos
- Born: July 6, 1920; Santander, Spain
- Died: March 21, 1985 (aged 64); New York City, U.S.
- Resting place: Arlington National Cemetery
- Occupations: sailor, businessman
- Known for: First USCG officer of hispanic origin

Joseph L. Tezanos (born José Tezanos, July 6, 1920 – March 21, 1985) was the first American of Hispanic descent to join the United States Coast Guard's reserve officer ranks. During World War II Tezanos served as a gunner's mate aboard LST-20 during the invasions of Kiska, Alaska, Tarawa Atoll, Kwajalein Atoll, and in the Gilbert Islands. For participation in ad hoc rescue efforts on May 21, 1944 following a devastating explosion of ammunition back at Pearl Harbor that earned him a Navy & Marine Corps Medal for distinguished heroism. It was following the receipt of this medal that Tezanos was sent to a four-month officer training school. Following his commissioning Tezanos spent a year as a junior officer aboard the transport USS Joseph T. Dickman.

He was demobilized in early 1946, attending college and graduate school. Upon graduation he became a successful international businessman. Tezanos is interred at Arlington National Cemetery.

== Legacy ==
Tezanos is the namesake of the Sentinel-class cutter USCGC Joseph Tezanos.
