= Kazimierz Polus =

Polish serial killer and pedophile

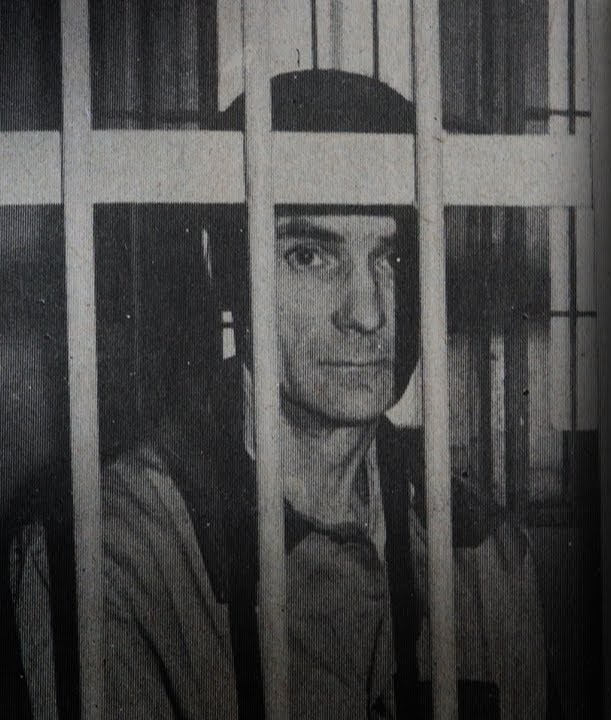
- Polus in 1984
- Born: 10 September 1929; Poznań, Poland
- Died: 15 March 1985 (aged 55); Poznań, Poland
- Cause of death: Execution by hanging
- Convictions: Murder (3 counts); Rape; Assault
- Penalty: Death

Details
- Victims: 3
- Span of crimes: 1971–1982
- Country: Poland
- Date apprehended: 5 January 1983

Kazimierz Polus (10 September 1929 – 15 March 1985) was a Polish serial killer and pedophile who killed two young boys and an adult man.

== Life ==
He graduated from 7th grade of primary school without a learned profession. He married in 1950, but his wife divorced him the following year.

The first time he had to deal with justice was in 1953 - he was convicted of assault and rape for 10 years in prison, serving 7 of them. In 1961 he was convicted for lewd acts and sentenced to another 10 years, this time serving in the Kalisz Penal Institution.

After leaving prison he moved to Szczecin, where he worked at Szczecin's Cellulose and Paper Works.

== Murders ==
On 27 May 1971, he murdered Krzysztof Tomczyk, an 8-year-old boy, by stabbing him in the chest four times with a kitchen knife. The autopsy confirmed that Krzysztof had been raped before his death.

In 1975 he moved back to Poznań, where he worked at the Voivodeship Transport Company, later at the Municipal Transport Company. He committed another crime in December 1975 - he murdered a 17-year-old boy after he sexually assaulted him. In December 1982 in the village of Plewiska, he murdered a 21-year-old man.

On 5 January 1983, he was arrested. The accusation was sent to the Poznań Provincial Court in January 1984. He was charged with three sexually motivated murders and appropriation of money belonging to one of the victims. On 13 April 1984, he was sentenced to death. He tried to appeal the verdict, but on 18 September 1984, the Supreme Court in Warsaw dismissed it. The State Council did not grant him clemency, and on 28 February 1985, the court issued a decision for the execution date. The execution was carried out at the Poznań Remand Prison on 15 March 1985.

== See also ==
- List of serial killers by country

== Bibliography ==
1. "He received life" (1 ed.). - Note: In the article, Kazimierz Polus is described as Włodzimierz Nowakowski
2. "He received life" (2 ed.). - Note: In the article, Kazimierz Polus is described as Włodzimierz Nowakowski
