= Philippe Cassuto =

- Born: 1 November 1959; Rhône, France
- Died: 2 March 2020 (aged 60); Paris, France

Academic background
- Education: Jean Moulin University Lyon 3
- Thesis: La place de l'hébreu dans le Tractatus theologico-politicus et le Compendium grammatices linguae hebraeae de baruch de Spinoza

Academic work
- Discipline: Hebraic and Semitic studies
- Institutions: University of Aix-Marseille; Institut de recherches et d'études sur le monde arabe et musulman

Philippe Cassuto (1959 – 2020) was a French professor of Hebraic and Semitic Studies at the University of Aix-Marseille and a researcher at the Institut de recherches et d'études sur le monde arabe et musulman. His scientific career and the publication of many books and works led him to be recognized before his death as one of the greatest international specialists in Hebrew massorah and grammar.

== Life ==
=== Education ===
From 1991 Cassuto holds a PhD from the Jean Moulin University Lyon 3 with the dissertation La place de l'hébreu dans le Tractatus theologico-politicus et le Compendium grammatices linguae hebraeae de baruch de Spinoza, under the tutelage of Pierre Cariou. In 2005 Cassuto earned his Habilitation to Supervise Research.

=== Teaching ===
In 1992, Cassuto was appointed lecturer in Hebrew and Semitic languages and literature at the University of Aix-Marseille I. In 2003 he become deputy Director at the Center for Continuing Education of the Université de Provence-Aix-Marseille I, qualified to direct research in 2005, and full professor in 2008.

== Festschrift ==
- Sartori, Manuel; Attia, Élodie (2023). Études sémitiques. Mélanges rassemblés à la mémoire de Philippe Cassuto. Presses universitaires de Provence. ISBN 9791032004647.

== Bibliography ==
=== Thesis ===
- Cassuto, Philippe (1991). La place de l'hébreu dans le Tractatus Theologico-Politicus et le Compendium Grammatices Linguae Hebraeae de Baruch de Spinoza (PhD diss. Jean Moulin University Lyon 3) (in French). OCLC 872601326.

=== Books ===
- ——————— (1989). Qeré-Ketib et listes massorétiques dans le manuscrit B 19a. Judentum und Umwelt (in French). Vol. 26. Frankfurt am Main ; Bern ; New York ; Paris : Lang. ISBN 978-3-631-42168-0.
- ——————— (1998). Spinoza et les Commentateurs Juifs: Commentaire biblique au Premier Chapitre du Tractus Theologico-Politicus de Spinoza (Hors collection). Publications de l'Université de Provence.
- ——————— (1999). Spinoza hébraïsant: L'hébreu dans le Tractatus theologico-politicus et le Compendium grammatices linguae hebraeae. Collection de la Revue des études juives, ISSN 0777-785X. Peeters. ISBN 978-90-429-0795-9.
- ——————— (2015). Portiques de grammaire hébraïque. Aix-en-Provence: Presses universitaires de Provence. ISBN 978-2-85399-890-1.

=== Books edited ===
- ——————— (2017-01-01). "Switching of Labials in Biblical Hebrew". In ———————; Sartori, Manuel; Giolfo, Manuela E. B. (eds.). Approaches to the History and Dialectology of Arabic in Honor of Pierre Larcher. doi:10.1163/9789004325883. ISBN 978-90-04-32588-3.
- ———————; Edzard, Lutz; Sartori, Manuel, eds. (2018). Case and mood endings in semitic languages - myth or reality? = Désinences casuelles et modales dans les langues sémitiques – mythe ou réalité ?. Abhandlungen für die Kunde des Morgenlandes. Vol. 116. Wiesbaden: Deutsche Morgenländische Gesellschaft, Otto Harrassowitz GmbH & Co. KG. ISBN 978-3-447-11093-8.

=== Articles ===
- ——————— (1988-08-19). "Au Pied de la Lettre". Textus. 14 (1): 27–40. doi:10.1163/2589255X-01401004. ISSN 0082-3767.
- ——————— (1990-08-19). "Qeré-Ketiv et Massora Magna dans le Manuscrit B 19a". Textus. 15 (1): 85–118. doi:10.1163/2589255X-01501006. ISSN 0082-3767.
