= Elisabeth Cassutto =

American evangelist (1931 – 1984)

Elly and Ernest Cassutto

Elisabeth "Elly" Cassutto (1931–1984) was the wife of Rev. Ernest H. Cassutto, a fellow Holocaust survivor from The Netherlands.

Elly Rodrigues as she was known, was born in Amsterdam, the Netherlands, on April 23, 1931. She and her older brother, Henry, came from an observant Jewish family. She was a neighbor and schoolmate of Anne Frank. Like Anne, she and her family were forced to go into hiding when the Germans occupied the Netherlands during WW II. She and her brother were split up and sent to the Dutch countryside, to a small village called Hazerswoude-Dorp in the mid-west of Holland. They were hidden by two Christian sisters, Margriet "Grietje" Bogaards and Annie Ketel. During that time, Elly had to assimilate herself in the community as a Christian young girl and was told she had to change her last name to Van Tol, a generic Dutch name. She had to learn the New Testament and Christian songs and go to church to avoid detection. After the war, she and Henry learned that their parents had been captured and gassed in Auschwitz.

She had become a Christian and her guardian, Miss Bogaards, was allowed to adopt her. She did not want to abandon her Jewishness and joined the Hebrew Christian Youth Alliance. Henry, however, did not convert. She met her future husband, Ernest Cassutto, at one of the Youth Alliance meetings. She and Ernest married in 1949. He became a Dutch Reformed minister and she enjoyed her duties as the minister's wife. In 1952, they received an invitation to become missionaries to the Jews and immigrants in the New York-New Jersey area. They accepted and became ministers-at-large to this community and settled in Passaic, N.J. with their infant daughter. Later, the family expanded to include two sets of twins, first girls, and then boys.

In 1968, Rev. and Mrs. Cassutto were called to become the pastor of the Emmanuel Hebrew Christian Church of Villa Nova, Baltimore County. Mrs. Cassutto had gone to college, and in 1977, received her teaching certificate from Towson State (Md.) She taught foreign languages and gave many talks in area churches and schools about her war experiences.

Elly Cassutto died on May 5, 1984, at the age of 53 in Baltimore County. Her brother, Henry Rodrigues, died July 15, 2007, in Long Island, NY. Elly's story is included in her late husband's book, The Last Jew of Rotterdam and was known as "The Anne Frank with the Happy Ending." The story of Elisabeth Rodrigues Cassutto, and that of her husband, Ernest H. Cassutto, can be found on the World Wide web at the Cassutto Memorial Pages, maintained by their son, George Cassutto.
