= Cassatt =

Cassatt may refer to:

== People ==
- Alexander Cassatt (1839–1906), president of the Pennsylvania Railroad
- Edward B. Cassatt (1868–1922), American soldier and breeder of thoroughbred horses, son of Alexander
- Edward R. Cassatt (1839–1907), American politician from Iowa
- Elsie Foster Cassatt (1875–1931), American sportswoman, daughter of Alexander
- Mary Cassatt (1833–1926), American painter, sister of Alexander

== Other ==
- Cassatt, South Carolina, unincorporated community, United States
- Cassatt Quartet, also known as Cassatt String Quartet
- 6936 Cassatt (6573P-L), asteroid

== Companies ==
- Cassatt & Company, a brokerage and investment banking firm in existence from 1872 to 1940
- Cassatt Corporation, software company headed by William T. Coleman III
