= James Roger Whelan =

Army Pilot

Air Commodore James Roger Whelan (April 29, 1914 – March 8, 1985) CBE 1968; DSO 1944; DFC 1940 (bar 1943) served in World War II as a pilot with Bomber Command and later doing photograph reconnaissance in the Middle East and Western Desert theatres. He was in charge of 200 men from 1941 to 1943 directing operations over the Mediterranean theatre.

Whelan rose to Air Commodore status after the war. He commanded RAF St Eval in Cornwall for two years from 1957, then RAF Christmas Island (now Cassidy International Airport) in 1959. He was Director of Intelligence in the Air Ministry from 1961 until 1964, the year in which that Ministry was disbanded.

Whelan was born in Bathurst, New Brunswick on 29 April 1914. His flying career started with open cockpit planes and included multi-engine jets.
