= Daniel Richard Lascelles =

British colonial judge (1908–1985)

Daniel Richard Lascelles CBE
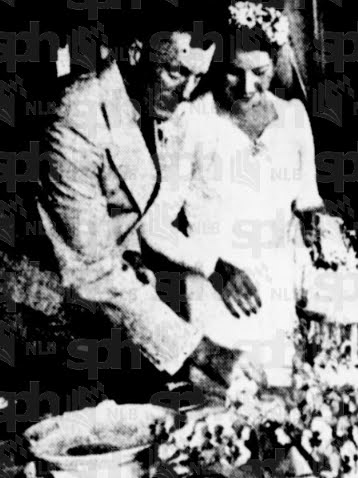
- Lascelles and his wife at their wedding in Sarawak in 1941
- Born: 18 September 1908
- Died: 1 March 1985 (aged 76)
- Education: St John’s College, Cambridge
- Occupations: Barrister and colonial judge
- Children: 3

Daniel Richard Lascelles (18 September 1908 – 1 March 1985) was a British barrister and colonial judge.

== Early life and education ==
Lascelles was born on 18 September 1908, the fourth son of Alfred Lascelles of Darlington, a councillor and JP. He was educated at Durham School and St John’s College, Cambridge. He was called to the Bar by the Inner Temple in 1930.

Lascelles joined the Sarawak Civil Service in 1932, and proceeded to serve in various posts throughout the territory including:– Registrar of the Supreme Court and Official Assignee (1933); Officer at Sibu and magistrate (1933); District Officer in the Third Division (1934), and in the Oya, Kapit and Miri Districts. In 1940, he was assistant Secretary for Defence. On the outbreak of World War II he was District Officer and Naval Reporting Officer in Miri. He was captured by the Japanese and imprisoned in Kuching from 1942 to 1945.

After the War, he returned to Sarawak as District Officer, Miri. In 1948, he was appointed a circuit judge of Sarawak. In 1950, he presided over the trial of ten Malays accused of the murder of the Governor of Sarawak, Duncan George Stewart. After Lascelles with five assessors found nine of the accused guilty, two of the men, considered the leaders, were subsequently hanged. In 1951, he joined the Colonial Legal Service and, after a year serving as acting puisne judge, he was confirmed in office as Puisne Judge of Supreme Court of Sarawak, North Borneo and Brunei, remaining in the position from 1952 to 1962. Fluent in the Malay and Dayak languages and familiar with their customs, it was said that, "he brought an important part in bringing to the judicature, a deep and sympathetic understanding of the local peoples' problems".

After 30 years' service in Sarawak's administrative and legal services, he retired to England in 1962 where he served as Legal Chairman of the Pensions Appeal Tribunals (1964–1974); Chairman of the Medical Appeal Tribunals (1967–1974), and Member of the Mental Health Review Tribunal (1967–1974).

== Personal life and death ==
Lascelles married Joy Burr, the daughter of a Malayan rubber planter, in 1941 in Miri, Sarawak, and they had two sons and a daughter.

Lascelles died on 1 March 1985, aged 76.

== Honours ==
Lascelles was appointed Commander of the Order of the British Empire (CBE) in the 1962 Birthday Honours.
