= Quins-Bobbies Rugby Club =

- Union: South African Rugby Football Union
- Founded: January 2017
- Location: Pretoria, South Africa

The Quins-Bobbies Rugby Club – also referred to as QBR – are a South African rugby union team, formed in 2017 following the merger of Pretoria Harlequins and Pretoria Police rugby clubs.

== History ==
=== Pretoria Harlequins ===
Pretoria Harlequins
- Full name: Pretoria Harlequin Rugby Club
- Nickname: Quins
- Founded: February 1906
Team kit

Official website
- www.quins.co.za

The Pretoria Harlequins started life as the Civil Service Club, but when the membership needed to be extended beyond the Civil Service, it was decided in February 1906 to change the name to "The Harlequin Rugby Club" and to ask for permission to use the London Harlequins colours and name.

Among the many members of the Harlequin family of rugby clubs, Pretoria were the first to be officially associated with the London club.

The Pretoria Harlequins resemble the Barbarians more than an ordinary club. It has produced a number of internationals and has strong representation in other sports such as Cricket and Golf.

The 1995 Rugby World Cup winning coach, Kitch Christie was first a player and then a coach at Pretoria Harlequins.

The current Pumas coach Jimmy Stonehouse, had a stint as head coach at the club before joining the Pumas in the Currie Cup.

=== Pretoria Police ===
Pretoria Police
- Full name: Pretoria Police Rugby Club
- Nickname: Bobbies
- Founded: 1922

Pretoria Police Rugby Club was founded in 1922 and was the most successful team in the Blue Bulls Rugby Union Carlton League, winning the title on 31 occasions. Prior to the formation of the Blue Bulls Rugby Union (then called the Northern Transvaal Rugby Union) in 1938, Pretoria Police also played in the Pirates Grand Challenge League of the Golden Lions Rugby Union (then called the Transvaal Rugby Union), winning that competition on four occasions.
