= Ernest Cassutto =

Dutch holocaust survivor (1919–1985)

Elly and Ernest Cassutto

Ernest H. Cassutto (1 December 1919 – 18 March 1985) was a Dutch Holocaust survivor who converted to Christianity during World War II.

== Holocaust Story ==
Born in Probolinggo in the Dutch East Indies (Indonesia) he was the middle son of secular Jewish parents. His father was a law professor in the Dutch East Indies. The family returned to The Hague, the Netherlands, in 1934. During the German occupation of the Netherlands, his family was hidden in several locations throughout the country. In 1944, Ernest was captured and imprisoned in Rotterdam and his fiance was sent to a concentration camp and was killed. He was rescued by a Dutch Christian underground worker just before he was to be executed by the Nazis as the war came to a close.

== Conversion and Life in America ==
Ernest later became a minister in the Dutch Reformed Church, and then immigrated to the United States in 1952, under the auspices of the Hebrew Christian Alliance and the Reformed Church of America. He settled in the U.S. with his wife and fellow Holocaust survivor, Elisabeth (1931-1984), and infant daughter and was a minister-at-large in the North Jersey-New York metropolitan area. In 1968 he became the pastor of the Emmanuel Hebrew Christian church in Villa Nova, Baltimore County, until his retirement in 1979. He died in the Baltimore area on March 18, 1985.

== Writing ==
Rev. Cassutto wrote a book about his captivity and rescue from Nazi imprisonment in 1974. The book was called The Last Jew of Rotterdam and was originally released by Whitaker House. The book went out of print, but because of continued interest in his story, was rewritten and updated by his son, Dr. Benjamin H. Cassutto. The newer version of the book was released by Purple Pomegranate Productions.

Another son, George H. Cassutto, wrote and maintains a website about Rev. and Mrs. Cassutto as the interest in their story continues.
