= Claudio Maniago =

Italian prelate of the Catholic Church (born 1959)

The Most Reverend Claudio Maniago
- Metropolitan Archbishop of Catanzaro-Squillace
- Church: Roman Catholic Church
- Archdiocese: Catanzaro-Squillace
- See: Catanzaro-Squillace
- Appointed: 29 November 2021
- Installed: 9 January 2022
- Predecessor: Vincenzo Bertolone, S.D.P.
- Previous posts: Auxiliary Bishop of Florence (2003-14); Titular Bishop of Satafi (2003-14); Bishop of Castellaneta (2014-2021)

Orders
- Ordination: 19 April 1984 by Silvano Piovanelli
- Consecration: 8 September 2003 by Silvano Piovanelli

Personal details
- Born: Claudio Maniago; 8 February 1959 (age 67) Florence, Italy
- Education: Almo Collegio Capranica; Pontifical Athenaeum of Saint Anselm
- Motto: In manus Tuas ("In Thy hands")
- Coat of arms

Ordination history of Claudio Maniago
History
Priestly ordination
- Ordained by: Silvano Piovanelli
- Date: 19 April 1984
Episcopal consecration
- Principal consecrator: Silvano Piovanelli
- Co-consecrators: Ennio Antonelli; Gualtiero Bassetti
- Date: 8 September 2003
Episcopal succession
Bishops consecrated by Claudio Maniago as principal consecrator
- Giuseppe Favale: 9 April 2016

Claudio Maniago (born 8 February 1959) is an Italian prelate of the Catholic Church who was named archbishop of Catanzaro-Squillace in 2021, after serving as the bishop of Castellaneta since 2014. He was previously an auxiliary bishop of Florence. He has led the liturgy programs of the Italian Episcopal Conference since 2015.

== Early years ==
Claudio Maniago was born in Florence on 8 February 1959, the son of a cook and a housewife from the Friuli region. He studied at the major seminary there and then in Rome at the Almo Collegio Capranica. He earned a licentiate in liturgy at the Pontifical Athenaeum of Saint Anselm. On 19 April 1984, he was ordained a priest of the Archdiocese of Florence by Archbishop Silvano Piovanelli.

From 1987 to 1994 he was rector of the minor seminary, director of the diocesan center for vocations, a member of the diocesan pastoral council, and chaplain of the local Serra Club. In 1988 he became the Master of Ceremonies for the archdiocese and a lecturer in liturgy at the Theological Faculty of Northern Italy. In 1994 he became pro-vicar general of the archdiocese, moderator of its curia and honorary canon of the cathedral church of Florence. In 2001 he was appointed vicar general of the archdiocese.

== Bishop ==
On 18 July 2003, Pope John Paul II appointed him auxiliary bishop of Florence and titular bishop of Satafi. On 8 September he received his episcopal ordination from Cardinal Silvano Piovanelli, with co-consecrators Archbishop Ennio Antonelli and Bishop Gualtiero Bassetti. He was the youngest bishop in Italy at the time. Among the attendees was his friend Piero Marini, the Master of Pontifical Liturgical Celebrations.

In addition to his assignments in Florence, he became the secretary of the Commission for the Liturgy of the Italian Episcopal Conference (CEI).

On 12 July 2014, Pope Francis appointed him bishop of Castellaneta. He was installed there on 14 September 2014.

On 21 May 2015, the CEI elected him president of its Commission for the Liturgy. On 3 October he was also appointed, by the Permanent Bishop's Council of the CEI, president of the Liturgical Action Center (Centro Azione Liturgica), which on behalf of the CEI promotes the liturgical movement in the Church and the renewal envisioned by the Second Vatican Council.

On 28 October 2016, Pope Francis named him a member of the Congregation for Divine Worship and the Discipline of the Sacraments.

In March 2021, Pope Francis charged Maniago with undertaking a review of the Congregation of Divine Worship in anticipation of the appointment of a new prefect following the retirement of Cardinal Robert Sarah in February.

== Archbishop ==
Pope Francis named him archbishop of Catanzaro-Squillace on 29 November 2021. Maniago was installed there on 9 January 2022.
