= Gherardo Gambelli =

Italian Catholic archbishop (born 1969)

His Excellency, The Most Reverend Gherardo Gambelli
- Archbishop of Florence
- Church: Roman Catholic Church
- Province: Florence
- See: Florence
- Appointed: 18 April 2024
- Installed: 24 June 2024
- Predecessor: Giuseppe Betori

Orders
- Ordination: 2 June 1996 by Silvano Piovanelli
- Consecration: 24 June 2024 by Giuseppe Betori

Personal details
- Born: 23 June 1969 (age 56) Viareggio, Italy
- Denomination: Roman Catholic

Styles of Gherardo Gambelli
- Reference style: His Excellency; The Most Reverend
- Spoken style: Your Excellency
- Religious style: Archbishop

Gherardo Gambeli (born 23 June 1969) is an Italian Catholic prelate who has served as Archbishop of Florence since 2024. He devoted more than a decade of his time as a priest to missionary work in Chad.

== Early life ==
Gambelli was born in Viareggio on 23 June 1969 and raised in Castelfiorentino. He studied at the major seminary in Florence and on 2 June 1996, he was ordained to the Catholic priesthood for the Archdiocese of Florence by Cardinal Silvano Piovanelli, the archbishop of Florence at the time.

== Presbyteral ministry ==
Gambelli's first pastoral assignment was as parish vicar of the Chiesa di Santo Stefano in Pane in the district of Rifredi. After four years as an assistant priest, he undertook studies at the Pontifical Gregorian University, graduating with a licentiate in biblical theology in 2000. He then served as the administrator of the Pieve di Sant'Andrea in Cercina until 2006, while also teaching as a visiting professor at the Major Seminary of N'Djamena in Chad from 2001 to 2006.

After being awarded a doctorate from the Theological Faculty of Central Italy in 2007, Gambelli became a full-fledged pastor of Immacolata e San Martino in Montughi. He served in that capacity for four years before being sent as a missionary priest to the Archdiocese of N'Djaména in Chad in 2011. There, he served as parish priest of Sainte Joséphine Bakhita, was in charge of vocational pastoral care, and taught at the national minor seminary. Gambelli became rector of the Cathédrale Saint-Ignace in the neighbouring Apostolic Vicariate of Mongo in 2018, before being appointed vicar general of the vicariate following year. His years in Chad included two stints as a prison chaplain, from 2011 to 2017 at N'Djaména prison and from 2018 to 2022 at the prison in the Mongo Vicariate.

Upon his return to Italy in 2023, Gambelli became pastor of Madonna della Tosse.

He was also assistant spiritual director of the seminary and a prison chaplain.

== Episcopal ministry ==
Gambelli was appointed Archbishop of Florence on 18 April 2024. His appointment was described by Il Messaggero as part of a pattern in which Pope Francis chooses dark horse candidates with experience in parish and missionary work for important sees. Avvenire referred to him as "the priest of the peripheries, from Africa to prison".

Gambelli was consecrated and installed on 24 June 2024.

Catholic Church titles
Preceded by Giuseppe Betori	Archbishop of Florence; 2024–present	Incumbent
