= Santa Maria al Paradiso =

San Paolo Maggioreo may refer to:

- Santa Maria al Paradiso, Milan, church in Milan, Italy
- Santa Maria e Santa Brigida al Paradiso, church in FLorence, Italy
