= George Edward Lynch =

American Catholic bishop (1917–2003)

Most Reverend George E. Lynch
- Auxiliary Bishop of Raleigh
- Church: Catholic Church
- See: Titular see of Satafi
- Appointed: October 20, 1969
- In office: January 6, 1970 - April 16, 1985

Orders
- Ordination: May 29, 1943 by John Michael McNamara
- Consecration: January 6, 1970 by Vincent Stanislaus Waters

Personal details
- Born: March 4, 1917 Bronx, New York
- Died: May 25, 2003 (aged 86)

George Edward Lynch (March 4, 1917 – May 25, 2003) was an American prelate of the Catholic Church who served as an auxiliary bishop of the Diocese of Raleigh in North Carolina from 1970 to 1985.

== Biography ==
George Lynch was born on March 4, 1917, in New York City in the borough of the Bronx, to Timothy and Margaret (O'Donnell) Lynch. He was ordained a priest in Washington, D.C. by Bishop John McNamara for the Diocese of Raleigh on May 29, 1943. Lynch earned a Doctor of Canon Law degree at the Catholic University of America in Washington, D.C., with the publication of his dissertation, "Coadjutors and Auxiliaries of Bishops", (Catholic University of America diss. 238, 1947) 96 pp.

On October 20, 1969, Pope Paul VI appointed Lynch as titular bishop of Satafi and auxiliary bishop of the Diocese of Raleigh. He was consecrated at St. Barnabas Church in New York City by Bishop Vincent Waters on January 6, 1970. The principal co-consecrators were Bishops Joseph Federal and Charles McLaughlin.

Lynch's resignation as auxiliary bishop of Raleigh was accepted by Pope John Paul II on April 16, 1985. George Lynch died May 25, 2003, at the age of 86.
