= Cardinal electors in the 1978 conclaves =

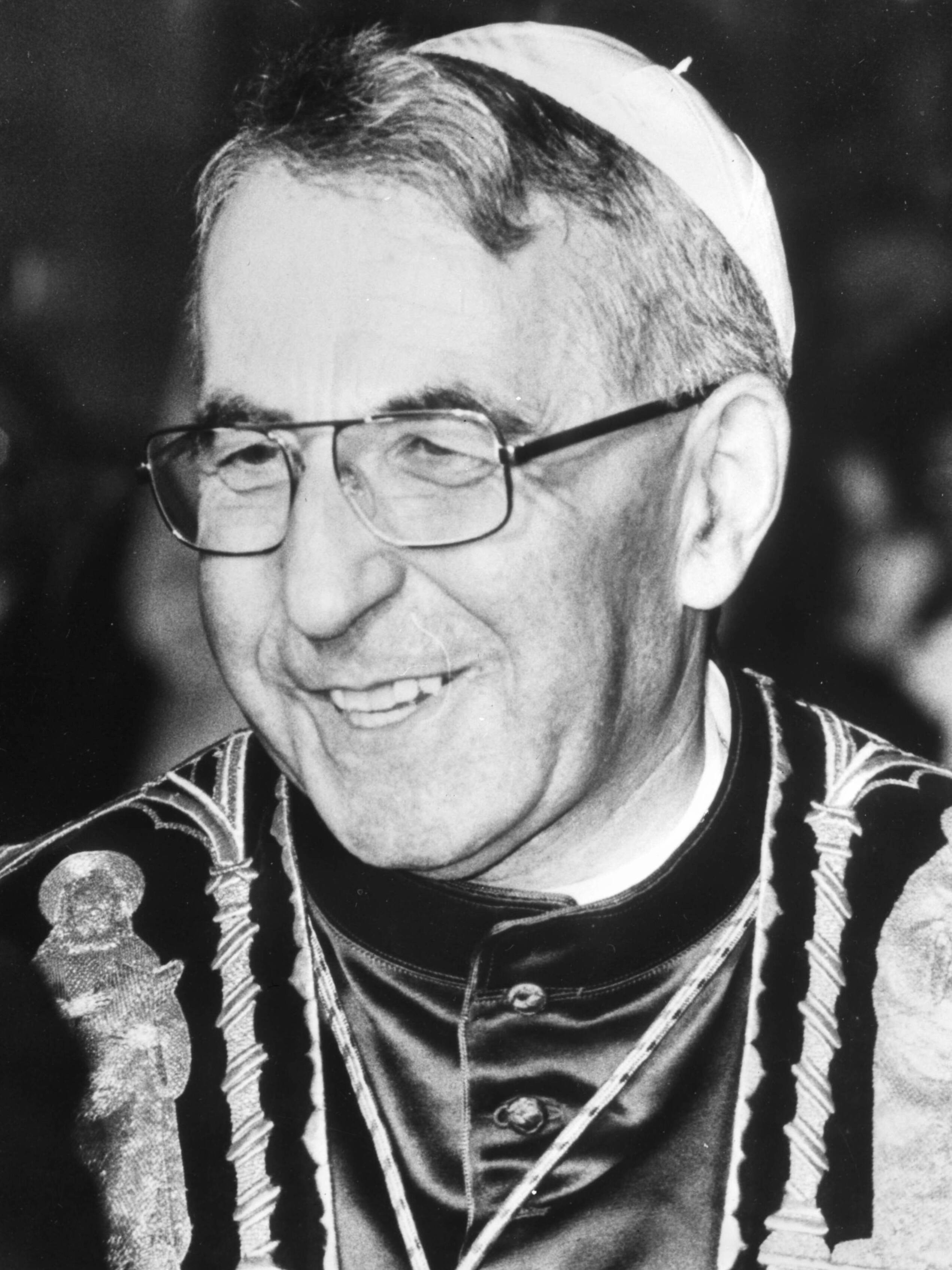
Cardinal Albino Luciani was elected Pope John Paul I by the conclave on 26 August 1978.

Cardinal Karol Wojtyła was elected Pope John Paul II by the conclave on 16 October 1978.

The papal conclaves of August 1978 and of October 1978 were convened to elect a pope, the leader of the Catholic Church, to succeed Paul VI and John Paul I following their respective deaths on 6 August 1978 and on 28 September 1978. In accordance with the apostolic constitution Romano Pontifici eligendo, which governed the vacancy of the Holy See, only cardinals who had not passed their 80th birthday on the day on which the conclave began (in these cases, those who were born on or after 25 August 1898 for the first conclave, and on or after 14 October 1898 for the second conclave) were eligible to participate. Although not formal requirements, the cardinal electors almost always elect the pope from among their number. The election was carried out by secret ballot (Latin: per scrutinium). Due to the brief duration between the conclaves, the respective lists of cardinal electors are nearly identical.

Of the 129 members of the College of Cardinals at the time of the beginning of the first conclave, 114 cardinal electors were eligible to participate in the subsequent conclave. (Note: Excluding Cardinal Paul Yü Pin, who died on 16 August 1978, after Paul VI's death but before the first conclave began) Three cardinal electors did not attend, decreasing the number of participants to 111. Two cardinal electors died in the time between the conclaves. Of the 126 members of the College of Cardinals at the time of the beginning of the second conclave, 111 cardinal electors were eligible to participate in the subsequent conclave; (Note: Excluding Cardinal Bolesław Filipiak, who died on 14 October 1978, after John Paul I's death and on the day on which the second conclave began) all of whom were in attendance. The required two-thirds-plus-one supermajority needed to elect a pope in either conclave was 75 votes.

Of the 112 cardinal electors who attended at least one of the two conclaves, 5 were cardinal bishops, 92 were cardinal priests, and 15 were cardinal deacons; 3 had been created cardinals by Pope Pius XII, 8 by Pope John XXIII, and 101 by Pope Paul VI; 28 worked in the service of the Holy See (such as in the Roman Curia), 77 were in pastoral ministry outside Rome, and 10 had retired. (Note: Three cardinals, Franz König, Joseph Parecattil and Johannes Willebrands, had pastoral duties outside Rome while also holding positions in the Vatican; they are counted in both categories.) The oldest cardinal elector in the conclaves was Joseph-Marie Trịnh Như Khuê, at the age of 79, and the youngest was Jaime Lachica Sin, at the age of 49–50. Another 15 cardinals were ineligible to participate in either conclave for reasons of age.

The cardinal electors entered the Sistine Chapel to begin the first conclave on 25 August 1978. On 26 August, after four ballots over two days, they elected Cardinal Albino Luciani, the patriarch of Venice, who took the papal name John Paul I. After his death 33 days into his papacy, the cardinal electors again entered the Sistine Chapel to begin the second conclave on 14 October. On 16 October, after eight ballots over three days, they elected Cardinal Karol Wojtyła, the archbishop of Kraków, who took the papal name John Paul II.

== Cardinal electors ==
The College of Cardinals is divided into three orders – cardinal bishops (CB), cardinal priests (CP), and cardinal deacons (CD) – with formal precedence in that sequence. This determines the order in which the cardinal electors entered the conclave, took the oath, and cast their ballots. For cardinal bishops (except the Eastern Catholic patriarchs), the dean of the College of Cardinals is first in precedence, followed by the vice-dean, and then by the remainder in order of appointment as cardinal bishops. For cardinal bishops who are Eastern Catholic patriarchs, cardinal priests, and cardinal deacons, precedence is determined by the date of the consistory in which they were created cardinals and then by the order in which they appeared in the official announcement or bulletin.

Two of the cardinal electors in the 1978 conclaves were from the Eastern Catholic Churches: Stéphanos I Sidarouss (Coptic) and Joseph Parecattil (Syro-Malabar). In both conclaves, the senior cardinal bishop, the senior cardinal priest, the senior cardinal deacon, and the junior cardinal deacon (Note: These cardinals were assigned specific roles in the conclave, such as presiding over the conclave itself (the senior cardinal bishop) or announcing the election of the pope (the senior cardinal deacon).) were, respectively, Jean-Marie Villot, Giuseppe Siri, Pericle Felici, and Mario Luigi Ciappi. Villot was also the camerlengo of the Holy Roman Church, who was in charge of administering the Holy See during its vacancy.

The 112 cardinal electors in the table below are those who participated in at least one of the two conclaves. Two cardinals participated in only one: Albino Luciani, elected Pope John Paul I in the first conclave and whose death prompted the second conclave; and John Joseph Wright, who did not participate in the first conclave for health reasons owing to surgery. Another two cardinal electors did not participate in the first conclave; both died before the second conclave began. The data below are as of 25 August 1978 or 14 October 1978, the respective dates on which the conclaves began. Age ranges are given for some cardinals in the case of any differences in age as at the beginning of the two conclaves. All cardinals are of the Latin Church unless otherwise stated. Cardinals belonging to institutes of consecrated life or to societies of apostolic life are indicated by the relevant post-nominal letters.

* Elected pope

Rank	Name	Country	Born	Order	Consistory	Office	Ref.
1	Jean-Marie Villot	France	11 October 1905 (age 72–73)	CB	22 February 1965; Paul VI	Secretary of State, Camerlengo of the Holy Roman Church and President of the Pontifical Council Cor Unum (Note: Resigned as President of the Pontifical Council Cor Unum after the first conclave and before the second conclave)	
2	Antonio Samorè	Italy	4 December 1905 (age 72)	CB	26 June 1967; Paul VI	Archivist and Librarian of the Holy Roman Church	
3	Francesco Carpino	Italy	18 May 1905 (age 73)	CB	26 June 1967; Paul VI	Archbishop emeritus of Palermo	
4	Sebastiano Baggio	Italy	16 May 1913 (age 65)	CB	28 April 1969; Paul VI	Prefect of the Sacred Congregation for Bishops	
5	Stéphanos I Sidarouss CM	Egypt	22 February 1904 (age 74)	CB	22 February 1965; Paul VI	Patriarch of Alexandria (Coptic Catholic Church)	
6	Giuseppe Siri	Italy	20 May 1906 (age 72)	CP	12 January 1953; Pius XII	Archbishop of Genoa	
7	Stefan Wyszyński	Poland	3 August 1901 (age 77)	CP	12 January 1953; Pius XII	Archbishop of Gniezno and of Warsaw	
8	Paul Émile Léger PSS	Canada	26 April 1904 (age 74)	CP	12 January 1953; Pius XII	Archbishop emeritus of Montreal	
9	José María Bueno y Monreal	Spain	11 September 1904 (age 73–74)	CP	15 December 1958; John XXIII	Archbishop of Seville	
10	Franz König	Austria	3 August 1905 (age 73)	CP	15 December 1958; John XXIII	Archbishop of Vienna and President of the Secretariat for Non-Believers	
11	Bernardus Johannes Alfrink	Netherlands	5 July 1900 (age 78)	CP	28 March 1960; John XXIII	Archbishop emeritus of Utrecht	
12	Laurean Rugambwa	Tanzania	12 July 1912 (age 66)	CP	28 March 1960; John XXIII	Archbishop of Dar-es-Salaam	
13	José Humberto Quintero Parra	Venezuela	22 September 1902 (age 75–76)	CP	16 January 1961; John XXIII	Archbishop of Caracas	
14	Juan Landázuri Ricketts OFM	Peru	19 November 1913 (age 64)	CP	19 March 1962; John XXIII	Archbishop of Lima	
15	Raúl Silva Henríquez SDB	Chile	27 September 1907 (age 70–71)	CP	19 March 1962; John XXIII	Archbishop of Santiago de Chile	
16	Leo-Jozef Suenens	Belgium	16 July 1904 (age 74)	CP	19 March 1962; John XXIII	Archbishop of Mechelen–Brussels	
17	Thomas Benjamin Cooray OMI	Sri Lanka	28 December 1901 (age 76)	CP	22 February 1965; Paul VI	Archbishop emeritus of Colombo	
18	Maurice Roy	Canada	25 January 1905 (age 73)	CP	22 February 1965; Paul VI	Archbishop of Quebec	
19	Owen McCann	South Africa	29 June 1907 (age 71)	CP	22 February 1965; Paul VI	Archbishop of Cape Town	
20	Léon-Étienne Duval	Algeria	9 November 1903 (age 74)	CP	22 February 1965; Paul VI	Archbishop of Algiers	
21	Ermenegildo Florit	Italy	5 July 1901 (age 77)	CP	22 February 1965; Paul VI	Archbishop emeritus of Florence	
22	Franjo Šeper	Yugoslavia	2 October 1905 (age 72–73)	CP	22 February 1965; Paul VI	Prefect of the Sacred Congregation for the Doctrine of the Faith	
23	Paul Zoungrana MAfr	Upper Volta	3 September 1917 (age 60–61)	CP	22 February 1965; Paul VI	Archbishop of Ouagadougou	
24	Agnelo Rossi	Brazil	14 May 1910 (age 68)	CP	22 February 1965; Paul VI	Prefect of the Sacred Congregation for the Evangelization of Peoples	
25	Giovanni Colombo	Italy	6 December 1902 (age 75)	CP	22 February 1965; Paul VI	Archbishop of Milan	
26	Gabriel-Marie Garrone	France	12 October 1901 (age 76–77)	CP	26 June 1967; Paul VI	Prefect of the Sacred Congregation for Catholic Education and Camerlengo of the Sacred College of Cardinals	
27	Egidio Vagnozzi	Italy	26 February 1906 (age 72)	CP	26 June 1967; Paul VI	President of the Prefecture for the Economic Affairs of the Holy See	
28	Maximilien de Furstenberg	Belgium	23 October 1904 (age 73)	CP	26 June 1967; Paul VI	Grand Master of the Order of the Holy Sepulchre	
29	José Clemente Maurer CSsR	Bolivia	13 March 1900 (age 78)	CP	26 June 1967; Paul VI	Archbishop of Sucre	
30	John Joseph Krol	United States	26 October 1910 (age 67)	CP	26 June 1967; Paul VI	Archbishop of Philadelphia	
31	John Patrick Cody	United States	24 December 1907 (age 70)	CP	26 June 1967; Paul VI	Archbishop of Chicago	
32	Corrado Ursi	Italy	26 July 1908 (age 70)	CP	26 June 1967; Paul VI	Archbishop of Naples	
33	Alfred Bengsch	East Germany (Note: Territory as archbishop-bishop also included West Berlin)	10 September 1921 (age 56–57)	CP	26 June 1967; Paul VI	Archbishop-Bishop of Berlin	
34	Justinus Darmojuwono	Indonesia	2 November 1914 (age 63)	CP	26 June 1967; Paul VI	Archbishop of Semarang	
35	Karol Wojtyła*	Poland	18 May 1920 (age 58)	CP	26 June 1967; Paul VI	Archbishop of Kraków	
36	Michele Pellegrino	Italy	25 April 1903 (age 75)	CP	26 June 1967; Paul VI	Archbishop emeritus of Turin	
37	Alexandre-Charles Renard	France	7 June 1906 (age 72)	CP	26 June 1967; Paul VI	Archbishop of Lyon	
38	Alfredo Vicente Scherer	Brazil	5 February 1903 (age 75)	CP	28 April 1969; Paul VI	Archbishop of Porto Alegre	
39	Julio Rosales y Ras	Philippines	18 September 1906 (age 71–72)	CP	28 April 1969; Paul VI	Archbishop of Cebu	
40	Gordon Joseph Gray	United Kingdom	10 August 1910 (age 68)	CP	28 April 1969; Paul VI	Archbishop of Saint Andrews and Edinburgh	
41	Paolo Bertoli	Italy	1 February 1908 (age 70)	CP	28 April 1969; Paul VI	Prefect emeritus of the Sacred Congregation for the Causes of Saints	
42	Joseph Parecattil	India	1 April 1912 (age 66)	CP	28 April 1969; Paul VI	Archbishop of Ernakulam and President of the Pontifical Commission for the Revision of the Code of Oriental Canon Law (Syro-Malabar Catholic Church)	
43	John Francis Dearden	United States	15 October 1907 (age 70)	CP	28 April 1969; Paul VI	Archbishop of Detroit	
44	François Marty	France	16 May 1904 (age 74)	CP	28 April 1969; Paul VI	Archbishop of Paris	
45	George Bernard Flahiff CSB	Canada	26 October 1905 (age 72)	CP	28 April 1969; Paul VI	Archbishop of Winnipeg	
46	Paul Gouyon	France	24 October 1910 (age 67)	CP	28 April 1969; Paul VI	Archbishop of Rennes	
47	Mario Casariego y Acevedo CRS	Guatemala	13 February 1909 (age 69)	CP	28 April 1969; Paul VI	Archbishop of Guatemala	
48	Vicente Enrique y Tarancón	Spain	14 May 1907 (age 71)	CP	28 April 1969; Paul VI	Archbishop of Madrid	
49	Joseph Malula	Zaire	12 December 1917 (age 60)	CP	28 April 1969; Paul VI	Archbishop of Kinshasa	
50	Pablo Muñoz Vega SJ	Ecuador	23 May 1903 (age 75)	CP	28 April 1969; Paul VI	Archbishop of Quito	
51	Antonio Poma	Italy	12 June 1910 (age 68)	CP	28 April 1969; Paul VI	Archbishop of Bologna	
52	John Joseph Carberry	United States	31 July 1904 (age 74)	CP	28 April 1969; Paul VI	Archbishop of St. Louis	
53	Terence James Cooke	United States	1 March 1921 (age 57)	CP	28 April 1969; Paul VI	Archbishop of New York	
54	Stephen Kim Sou-hwan	South Korea	8 May 1922 (age 56)	CP	28 April 1969; Paul VI	Archbishop of Seoul	
55	Eugênio de Araújo Sales	Brazil	8 November 1920 (age 57)	CP	28 April 1969; Paul VI	Archbishop of São Sebastião do Rio de Janeiro	
56	Joseph Höffner	West Germany	24 December 1906 (age 71)	CP	28 April 1969; Paul VI	Archbishop of Cologne	
57	John Joseph Wright (Note: Did not participate in the first conclave for health reasons, due to surgery)	United States	18 July 1909 (age 69)	CP	28 April 1969; Paul VI	Prefect of the Sacred Congregation for the Clergy	
58	Johannes Willebrands	Netherlands	4 September 1909 (age 68–69)	CP	28 April 1969; Paul VI	Archbishop of Utrecht and President of the Secretariat for Christian Unity	
59	Albino Luciani* (Note: Died as Pope John Paul I on 28 September 1978; did not participate in the second conclave)	Italy	17 October 1912 (age 65)	CP	5 March 1973; Paul VI	Patriarch of Venice	
60	António Ribeiro	Portugal	21 May 1928 (age 50)	CP	5 March 1973; Paul VI	Patriarch of Lisbon	
61	James Robert Knox	Australia	2 March 1914 (age 64)	CP	5 March 1973; Paul VI	Prefect of the Sacred Congregation for the Sacraments and Divine Worship	
62	Avelar Brandão Vilela	Brazil	13 June 1912 (age 66)	CP	5 March 1973; Paul VI	Archbishop of São Salvador da Bahia	
63	Joseph Cordeiro	Pakistan	19 January 1918 (age 60)	CP	5 March 1973; Paul VI	Archbishop of Karachi	
64	Aníbal Muñoz Duque	Colombia	3 October 1908 (age 69–70)	CP	5 March 1973; Paul VI	Archbishop of Bogotá	
65	Luis Aponte Martínez	Puerto Rico (United States) (Note: Insular area of the United States)	4 August 1922 (age 56)	CP	5 March 1973; Paul VI	Archbishop of San Juan de Puerto Rico	
66	Raúl Francisco Primatesta	Argentina	14 April 1919 (age 59)	CP	5 March 1973; Paul VI	Archbishop of Córdoba	
67	Salvatore Pappalardo	Italy	23 September 1918 (age 59–60)	CP	5 March 1973; Paul VI	Archbishop of Palermo	
68	Marcelo González Martín	Spain	16 January 1918 (age 60)	CP	5 March 1973; Paul VI	Archbishop of Toledo	
69	Louis-Jean Guyot	France	7 July 1905 (age 73)	CP	5 March 1973; Paul VI	Archbishop of Toulouse	
70	Ugo Poletti	Italy	19 April 1914 (age 64)	CP	5 March 1973; Paul VI	Vicar General for Rome and Archpriest of the Papal Basilica of Saint John Lateran	
71	Timothy Manning	United States	15 November 1909 (age 68)	CP	5 March 1973; Paul VI	Archbishop of Los Angeles	
72	Maurice Michael Otunga	Kenya	January 1923 (age 55)	CP	5 March 1973; Paul VI	Archbishop of Nairobi	
73	José Salazar López	Mexico	12 January 1910 (age 68)	CP	5 March 1973; Paul VI	Archbishop of Guadalajara	
74	Humberto Sousa Medeiros	United States	6 October 1915 (age 62–63)	CP	5 March 1973; Paul VI	Archbishop of Boston	
75	Paulo Evaristo Arns OFM	Brazil	14 September 1921 (age 56–57)	CP	5 March 1973; Paul VI	Archbishop of São Paulo	
76	James Darcy Freeman	Australia	9 November 1907 (age 70)	CP	5 March 1973; Paul VI	Archbishop of Sydney	
77	Narciso Jubany Arnau	Spain	12 August 1913 (age 65)	CP	5 March 1973; Paul VI	Archbishop of Barcelona	
78	Hermann Volk	West Germany	27 December 1903 (age 74)	CP	5 March 1973; Paul VI	Bishop of Mainz	
79	Pio Taofinuʻu SM	Western Samoa	8 December 1923 (age 54)	CP	5 March 1973; Paul VI	Bishop of Samoa and Tokelau	
80	Octavio Antonio Beras Rojas	Dominican Republic	16 November 1906 (age 71)	CP	24 May 1976; Paul VI	Archbishop of Santo Domingo	
81	Juan Carlos Aramburu	Argentina	11 February 1912 (age 66)	CP	24 May 1976; Paul VI	Archbishop of Buenos Aires	
82	Joseph-Marie Trịnh Như Khuê	Vietnam	11 December 1898 (age 79)	CP	24 May 1976; Paul VI	Archbishop of Hanoi	
83	Hyacinthe Thiandoum	Senegal	2 February 1921 (age 57)	CP	24 May 1976; Paul VI	Archbishop of Dakar	
84	Emmanuel Nsubuga	Uganda	11 November 1914 (age 63)	CP	24 May 1976; Paul VI	Archbishop of Kampala	
85	Lawrence Trevor Picachy SJ	India	7 August 1916 (age 62)	CP	24 May 1976; Paul VI	Archbishop of Calcutta	
86	Jaime Lachica Sin	Philippines	31 August 1928 (age 49–50)	CP	24 May 1976; Paul VI	Archbishop of Manila	
87	William Wakefield Baum	United States	21 November 1926 (age 51)	CP	24 May 1976; Paul VI	Archbishop of Washington	
88	Aloísio Lorscheider OFM	Brazil	8 October 1924 (age 53–54)	CP	24 May 1976; Paul VI	Archbishop of Fortaleza	
89	Reginald Delargey	New Zealand	10 December 1914 (age 63)	CP	24 May 1976; Paul VI	Archbishop of Wellington	
90	László Lékai	Hungary	12 March 1910 (age 68)	CP	24 May 1976; Paul VI	Archbishop of Esztergom	
91	George Basil Hume OSB	United Kingdom	2 March 1923 (age 55)	CP	24 May 1976; Paul VI	Archbishop of Westminster	
92	Victor Razafimahatratra SJ	Madagascar	8 September 1921 (age 56–57)	CP	24 May 1976; Paul VI	Archbishop of Tananarive	
93	František Tomášek	Czechoslovakia	30 June 1899 (age 79)	CP	24 May 1976; Paul VI	Archbishop of Prague	
94	Dominic Ignatius Ekandem	Nigeria	1917 (age 60–61)	CP	24 May 1976; Paul VI	Bishop of Ikot Ekpene	
95	Giovanni Benelli	Italy	12 May 1921 (age 57)	CP	27 June 1977; Paul VI	Archbishop of Florence	
96	Joseph Ratzinger	West Germany	16 April 1927 (age 51)	CP	27 June 1977; Paul VI	Archbishop of Munich and Freising	
97	Pericle Felici	Italy	1 August 1911 (age 67)	CD	26 June 1967; Paul VI	Prefect of the Supreme Tribunal of the Apostolic Signatura and President of the Pontifical Commissions for the Revision of the Code of Canon Law and for the Interpretation of the Decrees of the Second Vatican Council (Protodeacon)	
98	Silvio Oddi	Italy	14 November 1910 (age 67)	CD	28 April 1969; Paul VI	Pontifical Legate for the Basilica of Saint Francis of Assisi	
99	Giuseppe Paupini	Italy	25 February 1907 (age 71)	CD	28 April 1969; Paul VI	Major Penitentiary	
100	Mario Nasalli Rocca di Corneliano	Italy	12 August 1903 (age 75)	CD	28 April 1969; Paul VI	Prefect emeritus of the Apostolic Palaces	
101	Sergio Guerri	Italy	25 December 1905 (age 72)	CD	28 April 1969; Paul VI	Pro-President of the Pontifical Commission for Vatican City State	
102	Sergio Pignedoli	Italy	4 June 1910 (age 68)	CD	5 March 1973; Paul VI	President of the Secretariat for Non-Christians	
103	Umberto Mozzoni	Argentina	29 June 1904 (age 74)	CD	5 March 1973; Paul VI	President of the Commission of Cardinals for the Pontifical Shrines of Pompeii and Loreto	
104	Paul-Pierre Philippe OP	France	16 April 1905 (age 73)	CD	5 March 1973; Paul VI	Prefect of the Sacred Congregation for the Oriental Churches	
105	Pietro Palazzini	Italy	19 May 1912 (age 66)	CD	5 March 1973; Paul VI	Secretary emeritus of the Sacred Congregation for the Clergy and of the Commission of Cardinals for the Pontifical Shrines of Pompeii and Loreto	
106	Opilio Rossi	Italy	14 May 1910 (age 68)	CD	24 May 1976; Paul VI	President of the Pontifical Councils for the Laity and for the Family	
107	Giuseppe Maria Sensi	Italy	27 May 1907 (age 71)	CD	24 May 1976; Paul VI	Apostolic Nuncio emeritus to Portugal	
108	Corrado Bafile	Italy	4 July 1903 (age 75)	CD	24 May 1976; Paul VI	Prefect of the Sacred Congregation for the Causes of Saints	
109	Joseph Schröffer	West Germany	20 February 1903 (age 75)	CD	24 May 1976; Paul VI	Secretary emeritus of the Sacred Congregation for Catholic Education	
110	Eduardo Francisco Pironio	Argentina	3 December 1920 (age 57)	CD	24 May 1976; Paul VI	Prefect of the Sacred Congregation for the Religious and Secular Institutes	
111	Bernardin Gantin	Benin	8 May 1922 (age 56)	CD	27 June 1977; Paul VI	President of the Pontifical Commission for Justice and Peace and of the Pontifical Council Cor Unum (Note: Appointed President of the Pontifical Council Cor Unum after the first conclave and before the second conclave)	
112	Mario Luigi Ciappi OP	Italy	6 October 1909 (age 68–69)	CD	27 June 1977; Paul VI	Pro-Theologian of the Pontifical Household	

=== Not in attendance ===
Rank	Name	Country	Born	Order	Consistory	Office	Reason for absence	Ref.
1	Valerian Gracias	India	23 October 1901 (age 76)	CP	12 January 1953; Pius XII	Archbishop of Bombay	Ill health; died on 11 September 1978, before the second conclave	
2	Bolesław Filipiak	Poland	1 September 1901 (age 76–77)	CD	24 May 1976; Paul VI	Dean emeritus of the Sacred Roman Rota	Ill health; died on 14 October 1978, the day on which the second conclave began	

== Cardinal electors by continent and country ==
The 112 attending cardinal electors in either conclave were from 49 countries (Note: With Puerto Rico not separately enumerated) on all six inhabited continents. The countries with the greatest number of cardinal electors were Italy (twenty-six in the first conclave, twenty-five in the second conclave), the United States (eight in the first conclave, nine in the second conclave; excluding Puerto Rico), and France (seven in both conclaves).

* Continent or country of elected pope

Cardinal electors by continent (August 1978)
Continent	Number	Percentage
Africa	12	10.8%
North America	15	13.5%
South America	16	14.4%
Asia	9	8.1%
Europe*	55	49.5%
Oceania	4	3.6%
Total	111	100.0%

Cardinal electors by continent (October 1978)
Continent	Number	Percentage
Africa	12	10.8%
North America	16	14.4%
South America	16	14.4%
Asia	9	8.1%
Europe*	54	48.6%
Oceania	4	3.6%
Total	111	100.0%

Cardinal electors by country (August 1978)
Country	Continent	Number
Algeria	Africa	1
Argentina	South America	4
Australia	Oceania	2
Austria	Europe	1
Belgium	Europe	2
Benin	Africa	1
Bolivia	South America	1
Brazil	South America	6
Canada	North America	3
Chile	South America	1
Colombia	South America	1
Czechoslovakia	Europe	1
Dominican Republic	North America	1
Ecuador	South America	1
Egypt	Africa	1
France	Europe	7
DR Germany	Europe	1
FR Germany	Europe	4
Guatemala	North America	1
Hungary	Europe	1
India	Asia	2
Indonesia	Asia	1
Italy*	Europe	26
Kenya	Africa	1
RO Korea	Asia	1
Madagascar	Africa	1
Mexico	North America	1
Netherlands	Europe	2
New Zealand	Oceania	1
Nigeria	Africa	1
Pakistan	Asia	1
Peru	South America	1
Philippines	Asia	2
Poland	Europe	2
Portugal	Europe	1
Puerto Rico (United States)	North America	1
Senegal	Africa	1
South Africa	Africa	1
Spain	Europe	4
Sri Lanka	Asia	1
Tanzania	Africa	1
Uganda	Africa	1
United Kingdom	Europe	2
United States	North America	8
Upper Volta	Africa	1
Venezuela	South America	1
Vietnam	Asia	1
Western Samoa	Oceania	1
Yugoslavia	Europe	1
Zaire	Africa	1
Total		111

Cardinal electors by country (October 1978)
Country	Continent	Number
Algeria	Africa	1
Argentina	South America	4
Australia	Oceania	2
Austria	Europe	1
Belgium	Europe	2
Benin	Africa	1
Bolivia	South America	1
Brazil	South America	6
Canada	North America	3
Chile	South America	1
Colombia	South America	1
Czechoslovakia	Europe	1
Dominican Republic	North America	1
Ecuador	South America	1
Egypt	Africa	1
France	Europe	7
DR Germany	Europe	1
FR Germany	Europe	4
Guatemala	North America	1
Hungary	Europe	1
India	Asia	2
Indonesia	Asia	1
Italy	Europe	25
Kenya	Africa	1
RO Korea	Asia	1
Madagascar	Africa	1
Mexico	North America	1
Netherlands	Europe	2
New Zealand	Oceania	1
Nigeria	Africa	1
Pakistan	Asia	1
Peru	South America	1
Philippines	Asia	2
Poland*	Europe	2
Portugal	Europe	1
Puerto Rico (United States)	North America	1
Senegal	Africa	1
South Africa	Africa	1
Spain	Europe	4
Sri Lanka	Asia	1
Tanzania	Africa	1
Uganda	Africa	1
United Kingdom	Europe	2
United States	North America	9
Upper Volta	Africa	1
Venezuela	South America	1
Vietnam	Asia	1
Western Samoa	Oceania	1
Yugoslavia	Europe	1
Zaire	Africa	1
Total		111

== See also ==
- Cardinals created by Pius XII
- Cardinals created by John XXIII
- Cardinals created by Paul VI
- Cardinal electors in the 1963 conclave
- Cardinal electors in the 2005 conclave
