= Giovanni Benelli =

Italian Cardinal

His Eminence Giovanni Benelli
- Cardinal, Archbishop of Florence
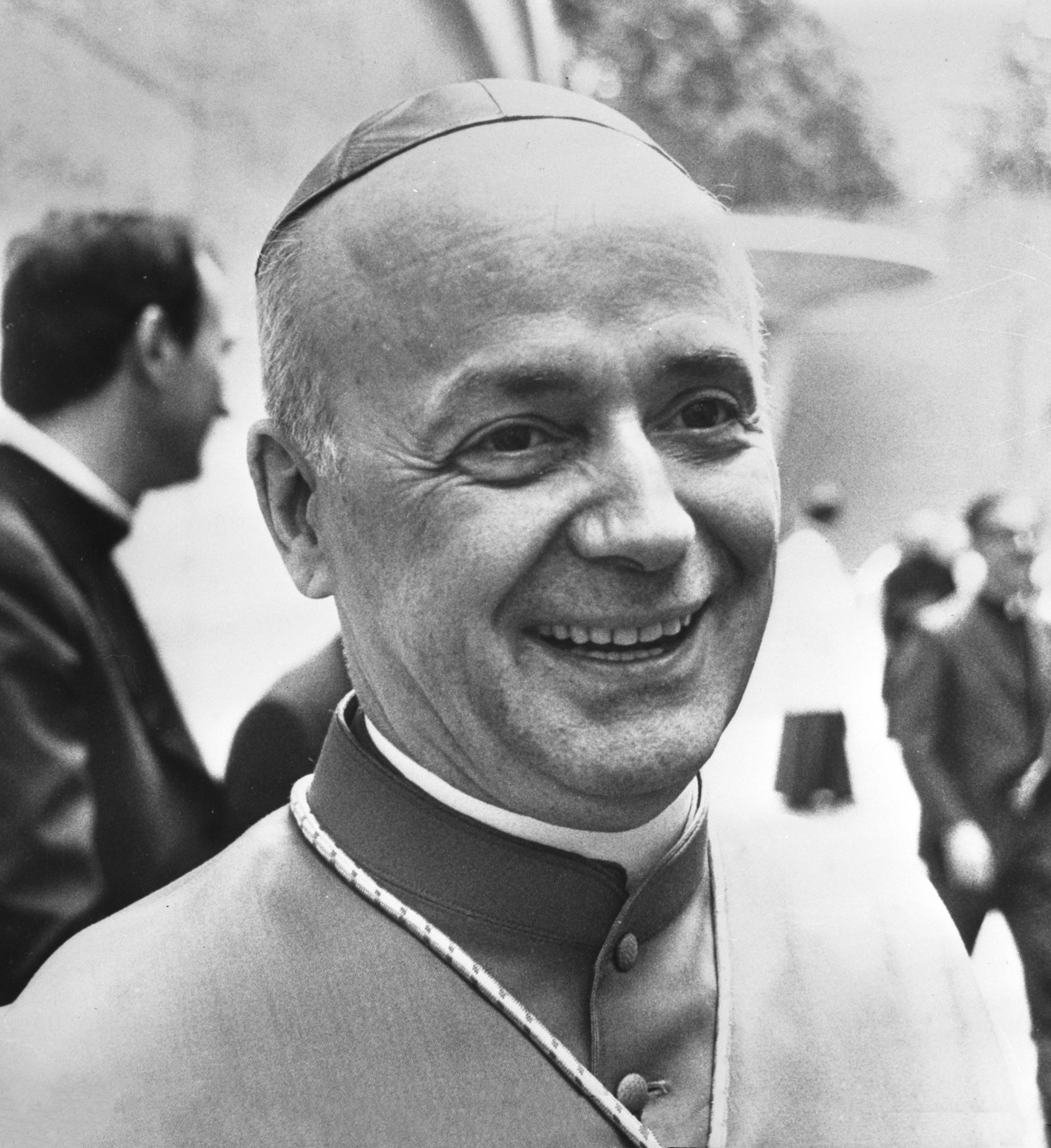
- Giovanni Benelli in 1978.
- Archdiocese: Florence
- See: Florence
- Appointed: 3 June 1977
- Term ended: 26 October 1982
- Predecessor: Ermenegildo Florit
- Successor: Silvano Piovanelli
- Other post: Cardinal-Priest of Santa Prisca (1977–82)
- Previous posts: Apostolic Pro-Nuncio to Senegal (1966–67); Apostolic Delegate to Western Africa (1966–67); Titular Archbishop of Tusuros (1966–77); Substitute for General Affairs (1967–77)

Orders
- Ordination: 31 October 1943 by Giuseppe Debernardi
- Consecration: 11 September 1966 by Amleto Giovanni Cicognani
- Created cardinal: 27 June 1977 by Paul VI
- Rank: Cardinal-Priest

Personal details
- Born: Giovanni Benelli; 12 May 1921 Vernio, Kingdom of Italy
- Died: 26 October 1982 (aged 61) Florence, Italy
- Motto: Virtus Ex Alto ("Power From on High")
- Coat of arms

Styles of Giovanni Benelli
- Reference style: His Eminence
- Spoken style: Your Eminence
- Religious style: Monsignor
- Informal style: Cardinal
- See: Florence

Giovanni Benelli (12 May 1921 – 26 October 1982) was an Italian Catholic prelate who served as Archbishop of Florence from 1977 until his death. He previously served as Deputy Secretary of State for the Holy See from 1967 until he was appointed to Archbishop of Florence and made a cardinal the same year.

== Biography ==
=== Early life and ordination ===
Giovanni Benelli was born 12 May 1921 in Poggiole di Vernio, Tuscany, to Luigi and Maria (née Simoni) Benelli. Baptised the day after his birth, on 13 May, he was the youngest of his parents' five surviving children, and his uncle Guido was a revered Franciscan friar. Benelli entered the Seminary of Pistoia in 1931, and then attended the Pontifical Gregorian University and the Pontifical Ecclesiastical Academy in Rome. He received the clerical tonsure on 23 December 1939, and was eventually ordained a priest on 31 October 1943 by Bishop Giuseppe Debernardi. At age 22, he had not yet reached the canonical age of 24 for priestly ordination, and therefore was given a special dispensation. Benelli finished his studies at the Gregorian in 1947, and also undertook pastoral work in Rome until 1950.

=== Roman Curia ===
His abilities were noticed by the Church, becoming private secretary in 1946 to Deputy Secretary of State Giovanni Battista Montini. Benelli joined the diplomatic service in 1948, and was raised to the rank of Monsignor on 16 July 1950. He served as the Secretary of nunciatures to Ireland (1950–1953) and to France (1953–1960). Benelli was then appointed to the following posts: auditor of nunciature to Brazil (1960–1962), counsellor of nunciature to Spain (1962–1965), and permanent observer of Holy See to UNESCO in Paris (1965–1966).

=== Archbishop ===
On 11 June 1966, he was appointed Titular Archbishop of Tusuro and Apostolic Nuncio to Senegal, as well as apostolic delegate to Western Africa. Benelli received his episcopal consecration on the following 11 September from Cardinal Secretary of State Amleto Giovanni Cicognani, with Archbishop Pietro Sigismondi and Bishop Mario Longo Dorni serving as co-consecrators. These assignments gave him a deep interest in the battle against illiteracy and the Church's work for peace and economic development.

Within a year, on 29 June 1967, he entered the Roman Curia as Substitute, or Deputy, of the Secretariat of State. As Cicognani was too old to fulfil most of his duties, they fell to Benelli. He worked closely with his former master, now Pope Paul VI, and remained in this post for ten years.

Some referred to him as "the Berlin Wall" and the "Vatican Kissinger" in the Vatican for his aggressive and almost authoritarian tenure as Substitute of the Secretariat of State, including having the more senior Curialists channel business through him.

Benelli was promoted to Archbishop of Florence on 3 June 1977, and was created Cardinal-Priest of Santa Prisca by Paul VI in the consistory of 27 June 1977.

=== Papabile ===
Upon the deaths of both Pope Paul VI and Pope John Paul I, Benelli was considered the leading moderate candidate to succeed them, because of his close ties with Paul and his Italian heritage. He was one of the cardinal electors in the conclaves of August and October 1978. During the August conclave, Benelli supported Albino Luciani, the eventual winner, who became Pope John Paul I. In the October conclave, in 1978, he was one of two leading Italian candidates in a tie with Giuseppe Siri to succeed John Paul I, but was defeated with fellow Italian candidate Siri on 16 October by Karol Wojtyła, who became Pope John Paul II.

=== Later life and death ===
Benelli continued in his capacity of Cardinal and Archbishop of Florence until 26 October 1982, when he died of a sudden heart attack in Florence, at age 61. His funeral Mass was celebrated by Cicognani's successor, Agostino Casaroli, and his remains were buried in Santa Maria del Fiore cathedral.

== In other media ==
- The Last Confession, a 2007 stage play where Benelli is the lead character.

Catholic Church titles
Preceded by Angelo Dell'Acqua	Substitute for General Affairs; 29 June 1967 – 3 June 1977	Succeeded by Giuseppe Caprio
Preceded by Ermenegildo Florit	Archbishop of Florence; 3 June 1977 – 26 October 1982	Succeeded by Silvano Piovanelli
