= Episcopal Conference of Italy =

Assembly of Catholic bishops in Italy

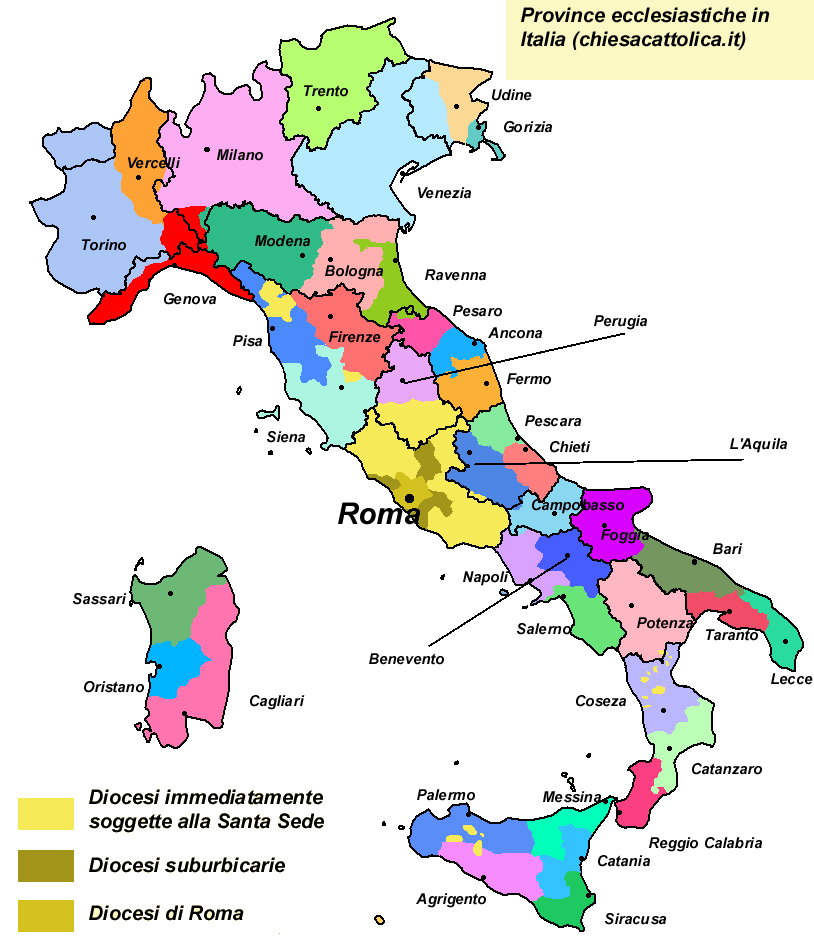
Archdioceses of Italy

The Italian Episcopal Conference (Italian: Conferenza Episcopale Italiana) or CEI is the episcopal conference of the Italian bishops of the Catholic Church. The conference was founded in 1971 and carries out various tasks, including setting the national liturgical norms for the Mass. Episcopal conferences receive their authority under universal law or particular mandates. Cardinal Matteo Zuppi was appointed its president by Pope Francis in 2022.

In 1986, Pope John Paul II suppressed 101 Italian dioceses. As of 2024 there are 226 dioceses in all. As of 2024 Italy has a total of 41 dioceses united in persona episcopi, or “in the person of the bishop.”

It is the only episcopal conference for which the pope appoints the president and secretary-general. In almost all other conferences the president is elected, while the secretary-general is elected in all others. (Note: The exceptions are Belgium, where the archbishop of Mechelen-Brussels is president ex officio, England and Wales where the archbishop of Westminster is president "ex officio", and the Latin church in Arab lands where the Latin Patriarch of Jerusalem is always president.)

At the beginning of his papacy in 2013, Pope Francis considered having the CEI membership elect its own president and secretary-general, a proposal that was once considered and abandoned by Pope John Paul II. In 2017, adopting a new procedure, the CEI members elected three candidates for president and submitted them to the pope, who was free to choose one of them or someone else.

Pope Francis repeatedly urged the CEI bishops to organize a national synod as discussed at their conference in Florence in 2015, first through surrogates and then himself inviting them to undertake a synod, eventually telling them in January 2021 that it was their duty and the time had come. The conference leadership submitted their synod proposal to him a month later. A public domain version of the Bible in Italian is published by the CEI. The conference established Italy's first national day of prayer for survivors of clerical sexual abuse on 18 November 2021.

== Leadership ==
=== Presidents ===
- Ildefonso Schuster (1952–1953)
- Adeodato Giovanni Piazza (1953–1954)
- Maurilio Fossati (1954–1958)
- Giuseppe Siri (1959–1965)
- A temporary committee of cardinals with collective presidency: Giovanni Colombo, Ermenegildo Florit, Giovanni Urbani (1965–1966)
- Giovanni Urbani (1966–1969)
- Antonio Poma (1969–1979)
- Anastasio Ballestrero (1979–1985)
- Ugo Poletti (1985–1991)
- Camillo Ruini (1991–2007)
- Angelo Bagnasco (2007–2017)
- Gualtiero Bassetti (2017–2022)
- Matteo Zuppi (24 May 2022 – present)

=== Secretaries-General ===
The official that deals with the day-to-day affairs of the Conference is the secretary-general.

- Camillo Ruini (28 June 1986 – 7 March 1991)
- Dionigi Tettamanzi (14 March 1991 – 20 April 1995)
- Ennio Antonelli (26 May 1995 – 5 April 2001)
- Giuseppe Betori (5 April 2001 – 8 September 2008)
- Mariano Crociata (25 September 2008 – 19 November 2013)
- Nunzio Galantino (30 December 2013 – 26 June 2018)
- Stefano Russo (28 September 2018 – 5 July 2022)
- Giuseppe Baturi (5 July 2022 – present)

== See also ==
- List of Catholic dioceses in Italy
- Avvenire
- TV2000
- Catholic Church in Italy
