= Elia Dalla Costa =

Italian Roman Catholic prelate and cardinal

His Eminence Elia Dalla Costa Venerable
- Cardinal, Archbishop of Florence
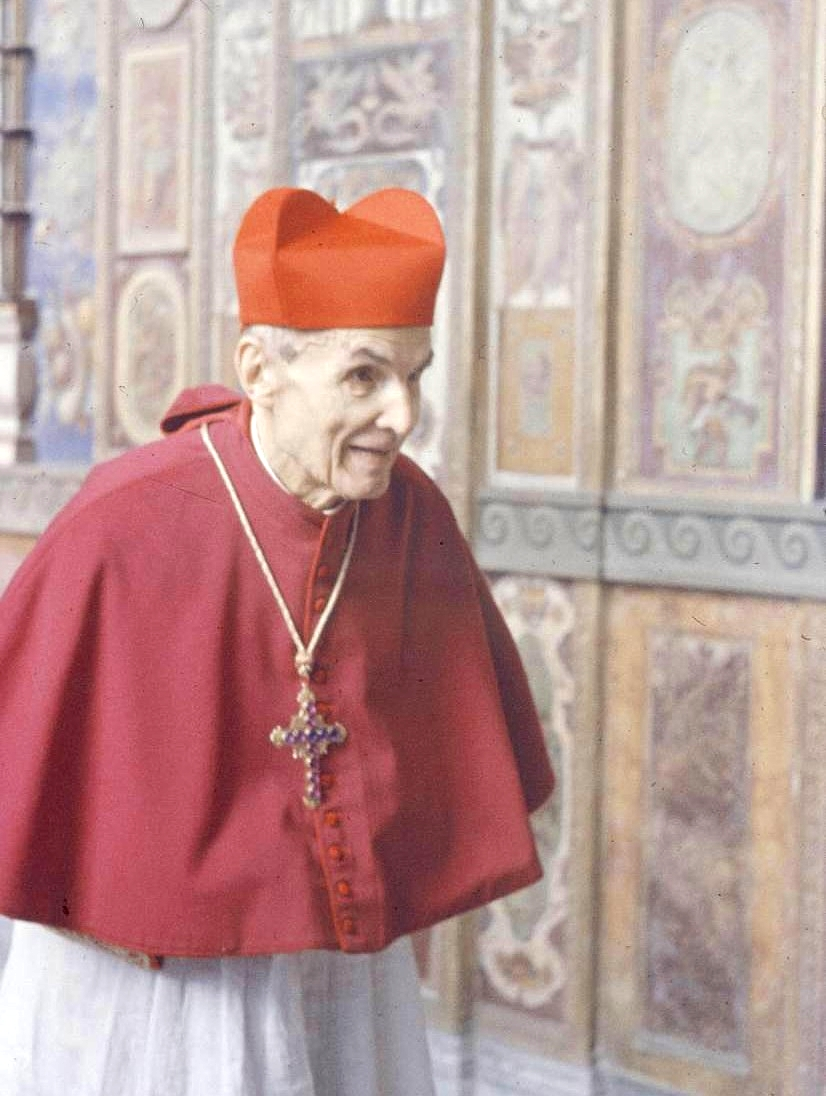
- Dalla Costa in October 1958
- Church: Roman Catholic Church
- Archdiocese: Florence
- See: Florence
- Appointed: 19 December 1931
- Installed: 21 February 1932
- Term ended: 22 December 1961
- Predecessor: Alfonso Mistrangelo
- Successor: Ermenegildo Florit
- Other post: Cardinal-Priest of San Marco (1933–1961)
- Previous posts: Bishop of Padua (1923–1931); Apostolic Administrator of Padua (1932)

Orders
- Ordination: 25 July 1895 by Antonio Feruglio
- Consecration: 12 August 1923 by Ferdinando Rodolfi
- Created cardinal: 13 March 1933 by Pope Pius XI
- Rank: Cardinal-Priest

Personal details
- Born: Elia Dalla Costa; 14 May 1872 Villaverla, Veneto, Kingdom of Italy
- Died: 22 December 1961 (aged 89) Florence, Tuscany, Italy
- Buried: Duomo di Firenze
- Denomination: Roman Catholic
- Parents: Luigi Dalla Costa and Tresa Dal Balcon
- Motto: Virtus ex Alto ("Power from on high" or "Strength from above")
- Coat of arms: Elia Dalla Costa's coat of arms

Sainthood
- Venerated in: Roman Catholic Church
- Title as Saint: Venerable

Styles of Elia Dalla Costa
- Reference style: His Eminence
- Spoken style: Your Eminence
- Religious style: Cardinal
- Informal style: Cardinal

Ordination history of Elia Dalla Costa
History
Priestly ordination
- Ordained by: Antonio Feruglio
- Date: 25 July 1895
Episcopal consecration
- Principal consecrator: Ferdinando Rodolfi
- Co-consecrators: Andrea Giacinto Bonaventura Longhin; Apollonio Maggio
- Date: 12 August 1923
Cardinalate
- Elevated by: Pope Pius XI
- Date: 13 March 1923
Episcopal succession
Bishops consecrated by Elia Dalla Costa as principal consecrator
- Francesco Niccoli: 26 June 1932
- Faustino Baldini: 21 September 1933
- Antonio Bagnoli: 7 October 1943
- Irzio Luigi Magliacani, O.F.M. Cap.: 28 May 1950
- Dino Luigi Romoli, O.P.: 25 April 1951

Elia Dalla Costa (14 May 1872 – 22 December 1961) was an Italian Roman Catholic prelate and cardinal who served as the Archbishop of Florence from 1931 until his death. Dalla Costa served as the Bishop of Padua from 1923 until 1931 when he was transferred to Florence; he was elevated to the cardinalate on 13 March 1933. Dalla Costa was a staunch anti-fascist and anti-communist and was known best for providing refuge for Jewish people during World War II and providing others with fake documentation to flee from persecution.

Dalla Costa was noted for his deep faith and holiness and became a revered figure in Florence. He was considered "papabile" in the conclave in 1939 since he was considered a pastoral and non-political prelate with a strong sense of faith. In 2012, the organization Yad Vashem named him as a "Righteous Among the Nations" due to saving the lives of Jews during the Holocaust at great risk to himself.

The cause for his beatification opened two decades after his death in 1981, and he was titled as a servant of God; he was named as venerable after Pope Francis confirmed his heroic virtue.

== Life ==
=== Education and priesthood ===
Elia Dalla Costa was born in 1872 in Villaverla as the last of five children to Luigi Dalla Costa and Teresa Dal Balcon; the couple's first three children had all died as infants. Dalla Costa received his baptism as "Elia Angelo" on 23 June from Father Angelo Rossi, and his godparents were Francesco Muraro di Bressanvido and Eugenia Dalla Costa. His mother died in 1877 when Dalla Costa was five, which left him in the care of his father.

Dalla Costa completed his high school education in 1886 and set out to commence his ecclesial studies after this. He attended the seminaries in Vicenza and Padua (graduating in literature from the college in Padua) before being ordained to the priesthood in 1895. He underwent further studies in 1895 and finished them later in 1897 before doing pastoral work in Vicenza, where he also taught. He served a brief stint as the parish priest at Villaverla as he substituted for an old and ailing pastor. He later served as the curate for Pievebelvicino and from 1902 until 1910 was the parish priest for Pozzoleone. On 10 November 1910, he was made the parish priest for Schio and remained there until 1922.

Dalla Costa rendered humanitarian services to the wounded and assumed care for orphaned children throughout World War I and was later decorated with the Croce di Cavaliere della Corona d'Italia for his actions. It was while serving as a bishop in Padua that he would restore 50 parishes that were damaged during the war.

=== Episcopate ===
In mid-1923, he was appointed as the Bishop of Padua and he received his episcopal consecration on the following 12 August from Bishop Ferdinando Rodolfi in the Vicenza Cathedral with Bishops Andrea Longhin and Apollonio Maggio serving as the co-consecrators. He was enthroned in his new diocese on the following 7 October at an installation Mass. Dalla Costa was later named as the Archbishop of Florence on 19 December 1931 and, for five months in 1932, served as the apostolic administrator for his old Padua diocese. He was enthroned in his new archdiocese in 1932.

=== Cardinalate ===
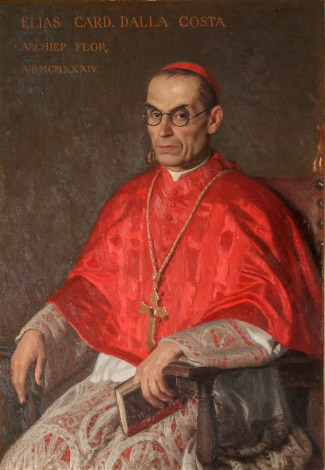
Portrait of cardinal Dalla Costa (1934)

Pope Pius XI created Dalla Costa as the Cardinal-Priest of San Marco on 13 March 1933. He received the red hat and his titular church on 16 March. Dalla Costa was a staunch anti-communist and anti-fascist; when Adolf Hitler visited Florence in 1938, he took the dramatic decision (despite great external pressure) to close all the doors and windows of the episcopal palace and refused to participate in the celebrations. He railed against the Italian Racial Laws, deeming them an affront to human rights and dignities. He was one of the cardinal electors in the 1939 papal conclave (at which he received some votes as he was also a "papabile" candidate) that selected Pope Pius XII. He was considered to be papabile due to his pastoral sensitivities and due to the fact that he was considered a non-political prelate. Cardinal Francesco Marchetti Selvaggiani — who had voted for Pacelli (later Pius XII) — said Dalla Costa would have been elected as pope if the cardinals had wanted "an angel" rather than a diplomat. There were some sources suggesting that Pacelli himself had voted for either Dalla Costa or Federico Tedeschini. But others suggested that his candidature did not gain traction since he was deemed too anti-fascist (which could have been problematic) and was deemed to be cold and aloof.

During World War II and the Holocaust, he became known for helping to save thousands of Italians from execution under the Fascist regime. He encouraged his priests to save Jewish people from persecution knowing all too well the fate that would befall them if arrested and deported. Dalla Costa organized an elaborate rescue network and also wrote to the heads of all the Florentine convents and monasteries asking them to shelter Jews to keep them safe. The cardinal also established a shelter for Jews within the Seminario Minore di Montughi and even sheltered some in the episcopal palace with him. Dalla Costa provided Jews with fake documents for them to flee and received these fake documents from one of the Franciscan monasteries in Assisi. But it soon became too dangerous to accept them from Assisi himself, so he decided that the Tour de France winner and famed athlete Gino Bartali (he presided over Bartali's 1940 wedding) could do so. Dalla Costa's rationale was that no soldier would dare stop Bartali from training when he was in fact delivering the fake documents. He had given safe haven to over 100 Italian Jews and 220 others from other countries.

After World War II, Florence emerged as an Italian capital of progressive Catholicism and left-wing thought; historian Gerd-Rainer Horn remarked: "Newly liberated Florence was then a laboratory of political and cultural experimentation, second to none in all of Italy. Nontraditional Catholic thinkers coexisted in the Tuscan capital city in fruitful interaction with radical democratic spokespersons and intellectuals emerging from the Partito d’Azione, side-by-side with open-minded representatives of the Communist tradition." This vibrant and reformist culture of Florentine Catholicism was attributed to Dalla Costa, who served as archbishop of Florence and represented a left-wing, staunchly progressive faction of Christian Democracy; Florence was also home to many left-wing Catholic politicians such as Giorgio La Pira. Ernesto Balducci argued that progressive Catholicism of Florence was a precursor to reforms of Vatican II: "I dare to say that in Florence one experienced the [Vatican II] Council [long] before the Council."

Dalla Costa was credited with being the "protective hand" of the city, aiding and speaking in favour of nonconformist and progressive Catholics in Florence. His reformist approach allowed for free development of reform-oriented and Catholic intellectuals in Florence, in effect producing more reformists than any other Italian city. Dalla Costa was also the mentor of Bruno Borghi, who took up full-time industrial labour in the 1950s and became involved in local trade unions, also forming postulates similar to liberation theology. Because of this, Borghi is regarded as the first worker-priest in Italy. Another progressive Catholic priest that received Dalla Costa's support was Enzo Mazzi, who became the parish priest of the newly built neighbourhood Isolotto in 1954. Under Mazzi's watch, Isolotto "became to second wave European Left Catholicism what the Besançon watch factory LIP became for the post-1968 European New and Far Left: the internationally most famous and infamous location of visionary conflict". To this end, Florence became known for its Left Catholic grassroots communities.

Together with Enzo Mazzi, Dalla Costa organized a Catholic social club in an abandoned factory in Isolotto, which also became a daycare centre, library and after-school coaching for the schoolchildren of socially disadvantaged families. It also expanded into other areas, such as becoming a nursery and a place for evening education classes and job training, as well as financial and moral assistance. Local newspapers hailed the club as “an organism articulated according to the highest standards of modern sociology”, praising it for filling the gap in the social life of the community and providing residents with a place to gather. Dalla Costa would also create a charity network through the centre, which was tasked with the distribution of clothing and food to local families in need.

On 15 November 1958, directors of the Galileo factory in Isolotto, which made optical equipment, announced plans to dismiss nearly 1000 workers. As a significant number of workers lived in Isolotto and were dependent on their job in manufacturing, the announcement sparked protests. In response, Dalla Costa released a public statement condemning the company for the layoffs and arguing that industrial leaders must recognize their social obligations instead of pursuing profit. Further chastising the industrialists, Dalla Costa stated that “those who do not use their assets for the good of the community hinder the affirmation of fundamental human and Christian values.” Cardinal's statement attracted significant attention, and "many newspapers printed the full text of Dalla Costa’s statement on the first page". Local trade unions and left-wing circles praised Dalla Costa's statement, with Giorgio La Pira declaring that his statement was “a type of act that recalls the gestures of the Prophets and Apostles of the Scriptures.” Left-wing newspaper Il Giornale del Mattino hailed Dalla Costa as the hero of the working class, listing his other achievements such as his stand against Mussolini as Bishop of Padova, rescuing Jewish refugees and intervening on behalf of striking workers during the Pignone crisis in 1953.

One of the consequences of the progressive Catholicism of the city was that Florence became the organizational hub of international meetings and peace conferences. The city largely resisted the anti-communist sentiment that marked the Cold War and was home to many conciliatory-minded clergy and thinkers who spoke in favour of peaceful, non-military solutions to Cold War confrontations between the Western and Eastern blocs. Dalla Costa himself stressed the need to enter dialogue with the Soviet bloc and seek rapprochement. An example of this was Dalla Costa's meeting with the acting mayor of Moscow, which became controversial in Italy; Horn recalled: "Virtually nowhere else in Italy — and probably nowhere else in Europe and the world at that time — could lay and Catholic observers witness the spectacle of a cardinal extending his welcoming hand to the acting mayor of Moscow in a location of such venerable tradition as Santa Croce in downtown Florence on the occasion of one of the spectacular international peace initiatives animated by La Pira."

Dalla Costa was close friends with Giorgio La Pira and the two often dined together and had discussions about the issues of the times. It was Dalla Costa who encouraged La Pira to run in Florentine local elections in 1951. The cardinal held two Catechetical Conferences in the archdiocese in 1933 and in 1940, and held two Diocesan Eucharistic Conferences in 1937 and later in 1946. He made four pastoral visits while serving as the archbishop. In 1951, he offered his resignation to Pope Pius XII though the pope refused it. But a compromise was later reached in 1954: Ermenegildo Florit was made the coadjutor so that he could aid Dalla Costa in his episcopal duties as the aged prelate grew ill.

He later participated in the 1958 conclave that resulted in the election of Pope John XXIII. Dalla Costa was a close friend of Roncalli and met with him twice prior to the conclave to discuss it. It was alleged that Roncalli had either voted for Valerio Valeri or his friend Dalla Costa. Dalla Costa believed that Roncalli would make a good pope and confided as much to his old friend. But Roncalli objected that he was too old to serve at 76 though the aged cardinal was said to have replied: "That's ten years younger than me". He attended the coronation for the new pope on 4 November 1958 and returned to Florence that month where he said to people: "We have chosen a pope that you will like". It had been said that Dalla Costa voted for Roncalli in the conclave.

Dalla Costa ordained the two future cardinals Domenico Bartolucci (1939) and Silvano Piovanelli (1947) as priests.

=== Death ===
Dalla Costa died from lung complications in Florence during the morning on 22 December 1961 and is buried in the Duomo di Firenze. He was the oldest member of the College of Cardinals at his death.

== Beatification process ==
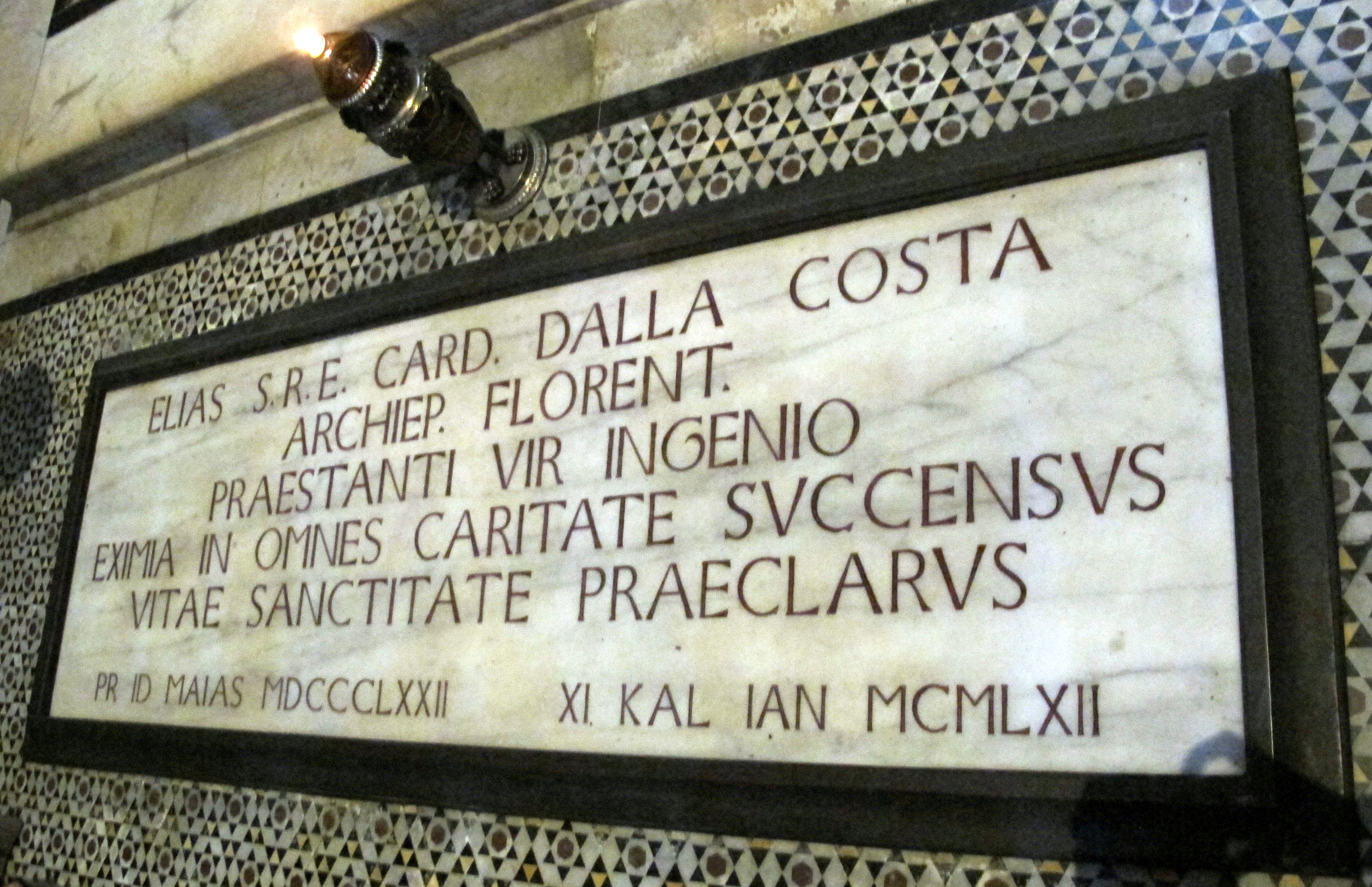
Tomb in the Florentine cathedral.

The cause for Dalla Costa's canonization opened on 26 January 1981 under Pope John Paul II after the Congregation for the Causes of Saints issued the edict of "nihil obstat" (nothing against the cause) and titled him a Servant of God. On 22 December 1981, the diocesan phase for the cause opened and closed sometime later. This investigation was held in the Florence archdiocese, and the C.C.S. later validated this investigation on 19 November 1993 before receiving the Positio dossier from the postulation in 2007. This dossier was an extensive collation of documents and testimonies collected throughout the diocesan process.

The board of theologians assented to the continuation of the cause after investigating the dossier in their meeting held on 29 November 2016, while the cardinal and bishop members of the C.C.S. also approved it later on 2 May 2017. Dalla Costa was named as Venerable on 4 May 2017 after Pope Francis confirmed that the late cardinal had lived a model Christian life of heroic virtue.

== Recognition ==
In November 2012 it was announced that Dalla Costa had been named on the previous 29 February as a "Righteous Among the Nations" after Yad Vashem in Jerusalem determined that he had done the most — at risk to himself — to save Jews from the horror of the Nazi Holocaust (or the Shoah) during the period before and during the war.

== Bibliography ==
- Bräuer, Martin (2014). Handbuch der Kardinäle: 1846-2012 (in German). Berlin: De Gruyter. pp. 281–282. ISBN 978-3-11-026947-5.
- Casini, Tito (1972). Elia Dalla Costa : vita e magistero. Firenze: Libreria editrice fiorentina. (in Italian)
- Pallanti, Giovanni (2012). Elia Dalla Costa. Il Cardinale della carità e del coraggio. Cinisello Balsamo: Edizioni San Paolo. (in Italian)
- Villani, Giulio (1974). Il vescovo Elia Dalla Costa. Per una storia da fare. Firenze: Vallecchi. (in Italian)

Catholic Church titles
Preceded by Luigi Pellizzo	Bishop of Padua; 25 May 1923 – 19 December 1931	Succeeded by Carlo Agostini
Preceded by Alfonso Mistrangelo	Archbishop of Florence; 19 December 1931 – 22 December 1961	Succeeded by Ermenegildo Florit
Preceded by Friedrich Gustav Piffl	Cardinal-Priest of San Marco; 16 March 1933 – 22 December 1961	Succeeded by Giovanni Urbani
Records
Preceded by Georges Grente	Oldest living Member of the Sacred College; 4 December 1956 – 5 May 1958	Succeeded by Francesco Morano
