= Archdiocese of Florence =

Metropolitan see of the Catholic Church

Archdiocese of Florence Archidioecesis Florentina

Catholic
- The Cattedrale di Santa Maria del Fiore, illuminated at night, showing the large red brick dome.

Location
- Country: Italy
- Ecclesiastical province: Florence
- Coordinates: 43°46′23″N 11°15′15″E

Statistics
- Area: 2,205 km^{2} (851 sq mi)
- Population: Total; Catholics: (as of 2021); 812,474; 808,286
- Parishes: 291

Information
- Denomination: Catholic
- Sui iuris church: Latin Church
- Rite: Roman Rite
- Established: 1st century
- Cathedral: Basilica Cattedrale di S. Maria del Fiore
- Secular priests: 352 (diocesan); 238 (religious); 66 permanent deacons

Current leadership
- Pope: Leo XIV
- Archbishop: Gherardo Gambelli
- Bishops emeritus: Ennio Antonelli; Giuseppe Betori

Map

Website
- diocesifirenze.it

The Archdiocese of Florence (Latin: Archidioecesis Florentina) is a Latin Church metropolitan see of the Catholic Church in Italy. It was traditionally founded in the 1st century, according to the 14th century chronicler Giovanni Villani. The diocese was directly subordinate to the Holy See (Papacy) until 1420.

Florence was elevated to the dignity of an archdiocese on 10 May 1419, by Pope Martin V. The ecclesiastical province of Florence, of which the Archbishop of Florence is the metropolitan, includes the suffragan dioceses of Arezzo-Cortona-Sansepolcro, Fiesole, Pistoia, Prato, and San Miniato.

The seat of the Archbishop of Florence is Florence Cathedral, otherwise the Basilica di Santa Maria del Fiore. Since 24th June 2024 Archbishop Gherardo Gambelli has been the Archbishop of Florence.

== History ==
=== Early history ===
The earliest reference to Christianity in Florence is Saint Minias of Florence, who according to his hagiography was an Armenian royal who refused to sacrifice to the roman gods due to his christianity, and was martyred in the city in 250 AD. However, no contemporary records of his life survive, and so he is considered to likely be legendary, or a figure of hagiographical elaboration.

The first historically verifiable evidence of a christian community in Florence is a recorded presence in the Roman Synod of Bishop Felix of Florentia Tuscorum dating to 313 AD, although the christian community likely emerged much earlier without official records.

=== 14th century ===
On 29 July 1322, Pope John XXII reserved to the pope the right to nominate as well as confirm the bishops of Florence.

Due to heavy rains in the autumn and winter of 1346–1347, the crops were a failure, in wheat as well as in grapes and olives. By May 1347 the price of wheat in Florence had doubled. Arrangements were made to import grain from south Italy, Sicily and Africa, but the merchants of Siena and Genoa, who were contracted to transport the foodstuffs, kept half for their own cities. 94,000 inhabitants of Florence were dependent upon municipal charity, and some 4,000 were said to have died of starvation.

Then, in April 1348, the pestilence known as the Black Death, struck Florence. By July nearly 100,000 people were dead. The historian Giovanni Villani estimated that nearly three out of every five persons in Florence and its neighborhood had been struck down. Ultimately he himself succumbed. In his famous introduction to the Decameron, Giovanni Boccaccio repeats the number 100,000 and provides harrowing details of the breakdown of social connections and human feelings.

Other episodes of pestilence in Florence occurred in 1325, 1340, 1344, 1363, 1509, 1522–1528, and 1630.

=== Council of Florence ===
In 1438, the Council of Basel was moved to Ferrara, and, in doing so, split into two factions, one remaining at Basel and electing their own pope, the Antipope Felix V. The faction that settled at Ferrara had to leave soon, however, due to an appearance of the plague. They were reconstituted at Florence by Pope Eugenius IV, and became the Council of Florence, which was transferred to Rome in 1443.

=== Chapter and cathedral ===
The current cathedral of Florence is dedicated to the Assumption of the Body of the Virgin Mary into Heaven. The cathedral was originally dedicated to S. John the Baptist, and occupied the former temple of Mars. When it became too small for the clergy and necessary rituals, a new cathedral, dedicated to S. Reparata, was built.

In 816, the Emperor Louis the Pious held a council at Aix, at which it was ordered that Canons and Canonesses live together according to a set of rules (canons, regulae). In the Roman synod of Pope Eugene II of November 826, it was ordered that Canons live together in a cloister next to the church. In 876, the Council of Pavia decreed in Canon X that the bishops should enclose the Canons: uti episcopi in civitatibus suis proximum ecclesiae claustrum instituant, in quo ipsi cum clero secundum canonicam regulam Deo militent, et sacerdotes suos ad hoc constringant, ut ecclesiam non relinquant et alibi habitare praesumant. The cathedral was administered by a Chapter, composed of five dignities and thirty-seven Canons. The dignities were: the Provost, the Archdeacon, the Archpriest, and the Dean.

The diocese also had twelve collegiate churches, the most important of which is San Lorenzo.

=== Diocesan synods ===
A diocesan synod was an irregularly held, but important, meeting of the bishop of a diocese and his clergy. Its purpose was (1) to proclaim generally the various decrees already issued by the bishop; (2) to discuss and ratify measures on which the bishop chose to consult with his clergy; (3) to publish statutes and decrees of the diocesan synod, of the provincial synod, and of the Holy See.

- 1073 - Raynerius.
- 1139 - Gottifredo degli Alberti.
- 1310, 13 August - Antonio D'Orso.
- 1327, 1 August - Francesco di Silvestro.
- 1343 - Angelo Acciaiuoli seniore.
- 1346 Angelo Acciaiuoli
- 1350, March - Angelo Acciaioli seniore.
- 1372, 13–14 January -Angelo Ricasoli.
- 1393, 3 July - Onofrio Visdomini.
- 1415 - Amerigo Corsini.
- 1446, 22 April - Antonino Pierozzi.
- 1508 - Cosimo Pazzi.
- 1517 - Cardinal Giulio de' Medici
- 1565, 29 March - Antonio Altoviti.
- 1569, 5 May - Antonio Altoviti.
- 1573, 9 April - Antonio Altoviti (provincial synod)
- 1589, 26 March – 11 June - Cardinal Alessandro de' Medici.
- 1603, 17 June - Cardinal Alessandro de' Medici.
- 1610, 27 May - Alessandro Marzi Medici.
- 1614, 4 June - Alessandro Marzi Medici.
- 1619, 14–15 May - Alessandro Marzi Medici.
- 1623, 17 May - Alessandro Marzi Medici.
- 1627, 18 May - Alessandro Marzi Medici.
- 1629, 10 May - Alessandro Marzi Medici.
- 1637, 16 June - Pietro Niccolini.
- 1645, 17 May - Pietro Niccolini.
- 1656, 4 April - Cardinal Francesco Nerli seniore.
- 1663, 26 September - Cardinal Francesco Nerli seniore.
- 1666, 23 September - Cardinal Francesco Nerli seniore.
- 1669, 25 September - Cardinal Francesco Nerli seniore.
- 1674, 12 September - Cardinal Francesco Nerli iuniore.
- 1678, 31 August - Cardinal Francesco Nerli iuniore.
- 1681, 27 August - Cardinal Francesco Nerli iuniore.
- 1691, 26 September - Jacopo Antonio Morigia.
- 1699, 24 September - Jacopo Antonio Morigia
- 1710, 10 September - Tommaso Bonaventura Della Gherardesca.
- 1732, 24 September - Giuseppe Maria Martelli.
- 1905, 21–23 November - Alfonso Maria Mistrangelo.
- 1936, 10–12 September - Cardinal Elia Dalla Costa.
- 1946, 8–9 May - Cardinal Elia Dalla Costa.
- 1988 - Cardinal Silvano Piovanelli.
- 1992 - Cardinal Silvano Piovanelli.

== Bishops of Florence ==
=== to 1200 ===
- Felix (attested 313)

...

- Zenobius (c. 376–417)

...
Mauritius ( –550)
...

- Reparatus (attested 679, 684)

...

- Speciosus (attested 716, 724)

...

- Thomas (attested 743)

...

- Aliprandus (attested 826, 833)

...

- Rodingus (attested 852)
- Gerardus (attested 853, 855)
- Petrus (attested 861)
- Andreas (attested 873, 876, 890)

...

- Grasulphus (attested 897, 898, 904)

...

- Podo (Podio) (attested 908–926)

...

- Raimbaldus (attested 941, 964)
- Sichelmus (attested 966, 972)

...

- Podio (Podius) (attested 987–999)
- Guido (attested 1004–1007)
- Ildebrandus (Hildebrand) (attested 1008–1024)
- Lambertus (attested 1025, 1028, 1032)
- Atto (attested 1036, 1037)
- Gérard de Bourgogne (1045–1058)
- Petrus Mezzabarba (attested 1065–1068). (Note: A native of Pavia, Petrus was the son of the wealthy Teuzo Mezzabarba, who may have engaged in simony to get his son elected bishop of Florence. Petrus then angered Pope Alexander II by seeking confirmation from the Emperor rather than the Pope. On 13 February 1065, Bishop Petrus made a feudal grant: Lami II, p. 783 column 1. In 1067, complaints against Petrus were brought to Pope Alexander in the Roman synod of that year; Cardinal Peter Damiani was sent to Florence to deal with the complaints. When the full facts were known, however, Pope Alexander condemned Bishop Petrus as a simoniac, and had him deposed.)

Sede vacante (1068–1071)

Rodulfus, Bishop of Todi, Apostolic Administrator

- Rainerius (attested 1071–1113): Rainerius died on 12 July 1113.
- Gotefridus (c.1114–c.1146)
- Actius (Atto) (1143–1154)
- Ambrosius (1155–1158)
- Julius (attested 1158–1182)
- Bernardus (1182-1187)
- Paganus (1087–1090)
- Petrus (1190–1205)

=== 1200 to 1411 ===
- Joannes de Velletri (1205–1230)
- Ardingus Trotti (1231–1247)
- Philippus Fontana (1250–1251)
- Joannes de Mangiadori (1251–after 1275)
- Jacobus (Castelbuono), O.P. (1286)
- Andreas de Mozzi (1286–1295)
- Franciscus de Monaldeschi (1295–1302)
- Loterius della Tosa (1303–1309)
- Antonius Orso (1310–1321)
- Franciscus Silvestri (1323–1341)
- Angelo Acciaiuoli, O.P. (26 Jun 1342–1355)
- Francesco degli Atti (1355–1356)
- Filippo dell'Antella (1357–1363)
- Pietro Corsini (1 Sep 1363 Appointed – 7 June 1370)
- Angelo Ricasoli (1370–1383)
- Angelo Acciaioli (1383 Appointed – 20 November 1385)
- Bartolomeo Uliari, O.Min. (1385–1389)
- Onofrio Visdomini, O.E.S.A. (1390–1400)
- Alamanno Adimari (1400–1401)
- Jacopo Palladini (1401–1410)
- Francesco Zabarella (1410– 17 June 1411)

=== Metropolitan Archbishops of Florence ===
==== 1411 to 1700 ====
- Amerigo Corsini (1411–1434)
- Giovanni Vitelleschi (1435– 9 August 1437)
- Ludovico Trevisano (Scarampi Mezzarota) (1437–1439)
- Bartolomeo Zabarella (18 December 1439 – 21 December 1445 Died)
- Antonino Forcilioni, O.P. † (10 Jan 1446 – 2 May 1459 Died)
- Orlando Bonarli (16 Jun 1459 – 1461 Died)
- Giovanni Neroni Diotisalvi (22 Mar 1462 – 1473 Died)
- Pietro Riario, O.F.M. Conv. (20 Jul 1473 – 3 January 1474 Died)
- Rinaldo Orsini (28 Jan 1474 –1508)
- Cosimo de' Pazzi (5 Jul 1508 – 8 April 1513 Died)
- Giulio de' Medici (9 May 1513 – 1523)
- Niccolò Ridolfi (11 Jan 1524 – 11 October 1532 Resigned)
- Andrea Buondelmonti (1532–1542)
- Niccolò Ridolfi, second term (1543–1548)
- Antonio Altoviti (25 May 1548 – 28 December 1573 Died)
- Alessandro Ottaviano de' Medici (15 Jan 1574 –1605)
- Alessandro Marzi de' Medici (1605–1630)
- Cosimo de' Bardi (9 Sep 1630 – 18 April 1631 Died)
- Pietro Niccolini (7 Jun 1632 – 1 December 1651 Died)
- Francesco Nerli (seniore) (16 Dec 1652 – 6 November 1670 Died)
- Francesco Nerli (iuniore) (22 Dec 1670 – 31 December 1682 Resigned)
- Giacomo Antonio Morigia, B. (15 Feb 1683 – 23 October 1699 Resigned)

==== Since 1700 ====
- Leone Strozzi, O.S.B. (21 Jun 1700 – 4 October 1703 Died)
- Tommaso Bonaventura della Gherardesca (12 Nov 1703 – 21 September 1721 Died)
- Giuseppe Maria Martelli (2 Mar 1722 – 10 February 1740 Resigned)
- Francesco Gaetano Incontri (29 May 1741 – 25 March 1781 Died)
- Antonio Martini (25 Jun 1781 – 31 December 1809 Died)
- Pietro Francesco Morali (15 March 1815 – 29 September 1826 Died) (Note: Pope Pius VII wrote to Morali in 1818 in connection with the Grand Duchy of Tuscany's regulations preventing senior ecclesiastical leaders from issuing pastoral writings without lay magistrate approval.)
- Ferdinando Minucci (28 Jan 1828 – 2 July 1856 Died)
- Giovacchino Limberti (3 Aug 1857 – 27 October 1874 Died)
- Eugenio Cecconi (21 Dec 1874 – 15 June 1888 Died)
- Agostino Bausa, O.P. (11 Feb 1889 – 15 April 1899 Died)
- Alfonso Mistrangelo, Sch. P. (19 Jun 1899 – 7 November 1930 Died)
- Elia Dalla Costa (19 Dec 1931 – 22 December 1961 Died)
- Ermenegildo Florit (9 Mar 1962 Succeeded – 3 June 1977 Retired)
- Giovanni Benelli (3 Jun 1977 – 26 October 1982 Died)
- Silvano Piovanelli (18 Mar 1983 – 21 March 2001 Retired)
- Ennio Antonelli (2001–2008)
- Giuseppe Betori (8 Sep 2008 – 18 April 2024 Retired)
- Gherardo Gambelli (24 June 2024 - Present)

== Churches ==
- Santa Maria e Santa Brigida al Paradiso

== Bibliography ==
=== Reference for bishops ===
- Gams, Pius Bonifatius (1873). Series episcoporum Ecclesiae catholicae: quotquot innotuerunt a beato Petro apostolo (in Latin). Ratisbon: Typis et Sumptibus Georgii Josephi Manz. pp. 747–748.
- Eubel, Conradus, ed. (1913). Hierarchia catholica (in Latin). Vol. Tomus 1 (second ed.). Münster: Libreria Regensbergiana.
- Eubel, Conradus, ed. (1914). Hierarchia catholica (in Latin). Vol. Tomus 2 (second ed.). Münster: Libreria Regensbergiana.
- Eubel, Conradus; Gulik, Guilelmus, eds. (1923). Hierarchia catholica (in Latin). Vol. Tomus 3 (second ed.). Münster: Libreria Regensbergiana.
- Gauchat, Patritius (Patrice) (1935). Hierarchia catholica. Vol. Tomus IV (1592-1667). Münster: Libraria Regensbergiana. (in Latin)
- Ritzler, Remigius; Sefrin, Pirminus (1952). Hierarchia catholica medii et recentis aevi V (1667-1730). Patavii: Messagero di S. Antonio.
- Ritzler, Remigius; Sefrin, Pirminus (1958). Hierarchia catholica medii et recentis aevi. Vol. Tomus VI (1730-1799). Patavii: Messagero di S. Antonio. (in Latin)
- Ritzler, Remigius; Sefrin, Pirminus (1968). Hierarchia Catholica medii et recentioris aevi sive summorum pontificum, S. R. E. cardinalium, ecclesiarum antistitum series... A pontificatu Pii PP. VII (1800) usque ad pontificatum Gregorii PP. XVI (1846) (in Latin). Vol. VII. Monasterii: Libr. Regensburgiana.
- Remigius Ritzler; Pirminus Sefrin (1978). Hierarchia catholica Medii et recentioris aevi... A Pontificatu PII PP. IX (1846) usque ad Pontificatum Leonis PP. XIII (1903) (in Latin). Vol. VIII. Il Messaggero di S. Antonio.
- Pięta, Zenon (2002). Hierarchia catholica medii et recentioris aevi... A pontificatu Pii PP. X (1903) usque ad pontificatum Benedictii PP. XV (1922) (in Latin). Vol. IX. Padua: Messagero di San Antonio. ISBN 978-88-250-1000-8.

=== Studies ===
- Barletti, Emanuele (1989). Il Palazzo arcivescovile di Firenze: vicende architettoniche dal 1533 al 1895 (in Italian). Firenze: Il Torchio.
- Caponi, Matteo (2009). "Una diocesi in guerra: Firenze (1914-1918)." Studi Storici vol. 50, no. 1, 2009, pp. 231–255. JSTOR, www.jstor.org/stable/25677430.
- Cerracchini, Luca Giuseppe (1716). Cronologia sacra de' vescovi e arcivescovi di Firenze (in Italian). Firenze: Jacopo Guiducci.
- Cappelletti, Giuseppe (1861). Le chiese d'Italia dalla loro origine sino ai nostri giorni (in Italian). Vol. Tomo decimosesto (16). Venice: G. Antonelli. pp. 409–712.
- Faini, Enrico (2013), "I vescovi dimenticati. Memoria e oblio dei vescovi fiorentini e fiesolani dell'età pre-gregoriana," in: Annali di Storia di Firenze VIII (2013), pp. 11–49. (in Italian)
- Kehr, Paul Fridolin (1908). Italia pontificia (in Latin). Vol. Tomus Tertius: Etruria. Berlin: Weidmann. pp. 7–72.
- Lami, Giovanni (1758). Sanctae Ecclesiae Florentinae Monumenta: Quibus Notitiae Innumerae Ad Omnigenam Etruriae Aliarumque Regionum Historiam Spectantes Continentur (in Latin). Vol. Tomus I. Florence: Salutata. Lami, Giovanni (1758). Tomus II. Lami, Giovanni (1758). Tomus III.
- Lanzoni, Francesco (1927). Le diocesi d'Italia dalle origini al principio del secolo VII (an. 604), Faenza 1927, pp. 573–584. (in Italian)
- Richa, Giuseppe (1757). Notizie istoriche delle chiese fiorentine divise ne'suoi quartieri (in Italian). Vol. Tomo sesto (6). Florence: Viviani. pp. 264–360.
- Ristori, G. B. (1896). "Alcune notizie sul palazzo del vescovo Fiorentino" in: Archivio storico italiano (in Italian). Vol. XVIII. Firenze: Leo S. Olschki. 1896. pp. 58–65.
- Schwartz, Gerhard (1907). Die Besetzung der Bistümer Reichsitaliens unter den sächsischen und salischen Kaisern: mit den Listen der Bischöfe, 951-1122. Leipzig: B.G. Teubner. pp. 207–210. (in German)
- Trexler, Richard C (1971). Synodal Law in Florence and Fiesole, 1306-1518. Città del Vaticano: Biblioteca Apostolica Vaticana 1971. [Studi e testi, 268].
- Ughelli, Ferdinando; Coleti, Niccolò (1718). Italia sacra sive De episcopis Italiæ, et insularum adjacentium (in Latin). Vol. Tomus tertius (3). Venice: apud Sebastianum Coleti. pp. 3–194.
