= Ennio Antonelli =

Italian prelate (born 1936)

His Eminence Ennio Antonelli
- President Emeritus of the Pontifical Council for the Family
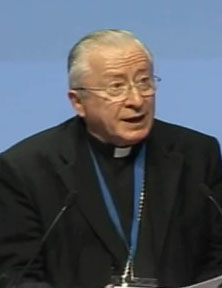
- Antonelli in Madrid in 2012.
- Church: Roman Catholic Church
- Appointed: 7 June 2008
- Term ended: 26 June 2012
- Predecessor: Alfonso López Trujillo
- Successor: Vincenzo Paglia
- Other post: Cardinal-Priest of Sant'Andrea delle Fratte (2003–)
- Previous posts: Bishop of Gubbio (1982–88); Archbishop of Perugia-Città della Pieve (1988–95); Secretary General of the Italian Episcopal Conference (1995–2001); Archbishop of Florence (2001–08); Apostolic Administrator of Florence (2008)

Orders
- Ordination: 2 April 1960 by Ilario Alcini
- Consecration: 29 August 1982 by Decio Lucio Grandoni
- Created cardinal: 21 October 2003 by Pope John Paul II
- Rank: Cardinal-Priest

Personal details
- Born: 18 November 1936 (age 89) Todi, Kingdom of Italy
- Denomination: Roman Catholic
- Education: Pontifical Lateran University; University of Perugia
- Motto: Voluntas Dei pax nostra
- Coat of arms

Styles of Ennio Antonelli
- Reference style: His Eminence
- Spoken style: Your Eminence
- Religious style: Cardinal
- Posthumous style: not applicable
- Informal style: Cardinal
- See: Florence (emeritus)

Ennio Antonelli (born 18 November 1936) is an Italian prelate of the Catholic Church who was president of the Pontifical Council for the Family from 2008 to 2012. He has been a bishop since 1982, serving as bishop of Gubbio from 1982 to 1988, archbishop of Perugia from 1988 to 1995, and archbishop of Florence from 2001 to 2008. He led the Italian Episcopal Conference from 1995 to 2001 and was raised to the rank of cardinal in 2003.

== Biography ==
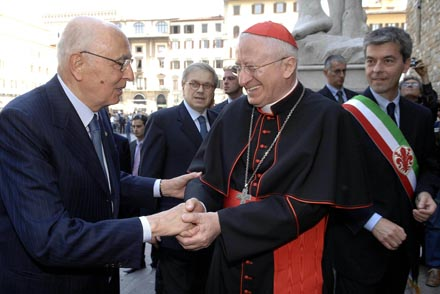
Antonelli, right, greeting Italian President Giorgio Napolitano in 2007

Born in Todi on 18 November 1936, he attended the seminary there, the regional seminary in Assisi, and the pontifical major seminary in Rome. He studied at the Pontifical Lateran University in Rome, earning a licentiate in sacred theology. He later earned a doctorate in classics at the University of Perugia. He was ordained a priest for the Diocese of Todi on 2 April 1960.

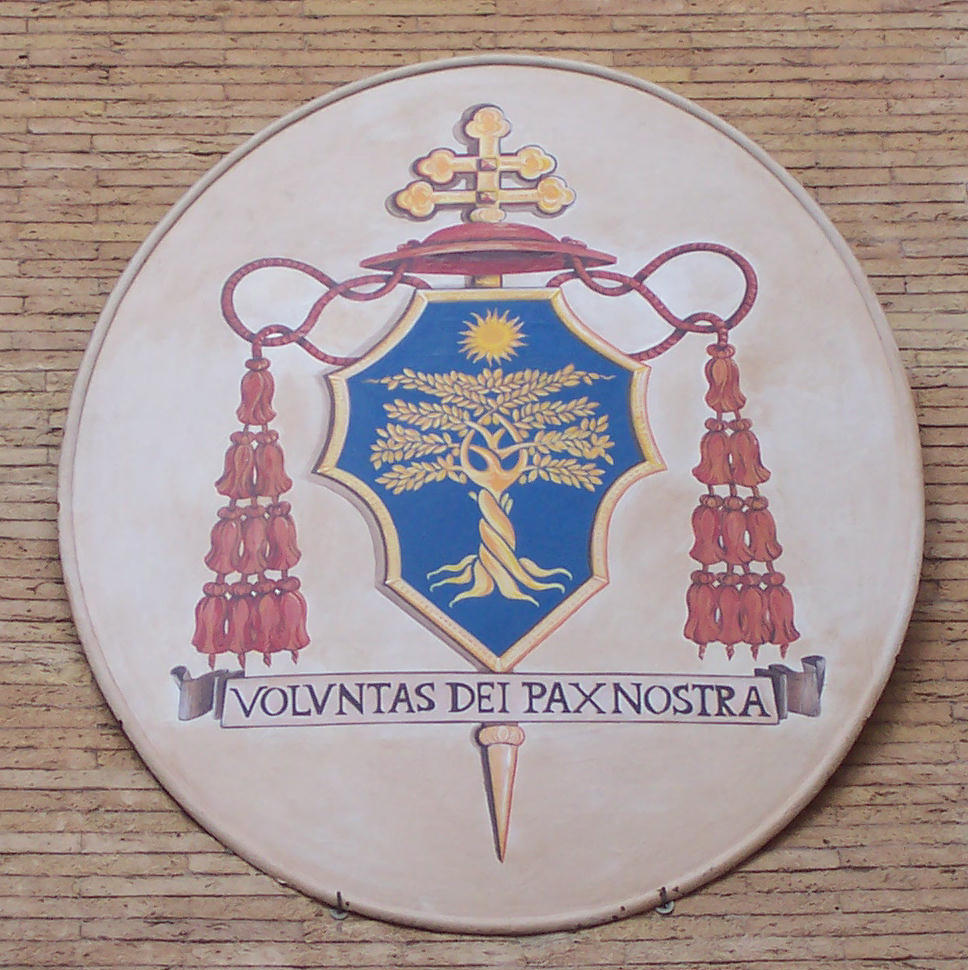
Cardinal Antonelli's coat-of-arms on the basilica of Sant'Andrea delle Fratte

He worked at the Seminary of Perugia as vice-rector, professor, and finally rector. He also taught theology at the regional seminary in Assisi, as well as art history in secondary schools in Assisi and Deruta. He was also a chaplain to Catholic teachers and student groups and a parish priest.

On 25 May 1982, Pope John Paul II appointed him bishop of Gubbio. He received his episcopal consecration on 29 August 1982 from Decio Lucio Grandoni, Bishop of Todi.

On 6 October 1988, he was promoted to Archbishop of Perugia-Città del Pieve.

He resigned as archbishop to serve a five-year term as Secretary-General of the Italian Episcopal Conference on 26 May 1995.

He served in this position until 21 March 2001, when he was named archbishop of Florence. He was installed there on 20 May.

Pope John Paul made him Cardinal-Priest of Sant'Andrea delle Fratte in the consistory held on 21 October 2003.

Antonelli served as a cardinal elector in the 2005 papal conclave that elected Pope Benedict XVI. He was viewed as papabile, a possible candidate for election to the papacy.

On 7 June 2008, Pope Benedict named him president of the Pontifical Council for the Family.

On 29 January 2011, Pope Benedict named Antonelli a member of the Pontifical Council for the Pastoral Care of Migrants and Itinerants.

He retired as president of the Pontifical Council for the Family on 26 June 2012.

On 15 September 2012, he was appointed to a five-year term as a member of the Congregation for the Causes of Saints.

He was one of the cardinal electors who participated in the 2013 papal conclave that elected Pope Francis.

== Views ==
Antonelli is generally seen as a moderate, with a strong interest in social justice and peace issues. In response to demands that the Church denounce divorcees who were candidates for political office in the 1990s, he said the Church should be more concerned with their voting record. When in 2009 the Italian Court of Cassation declared there was no substantial difference in law between a family based on marriage and one resulting from cohabitation, he reacted by saying that, in the light of recent sociological studies that reveal the benefits to society of what is called the traditional family and the disadvantages for society of single-parent families and those of cohabiting couples, the traditional family is needed more than ever today both for family members and for society as a whole.

Catholic Church titles
Preceded by Cesare Pagani	Bishop of Gubbio; 25 May 1982 – 6 October 1988	Succeeded by Pietro Bottaccioli
Preceded by Cesare Pagani	Archbishop of Perugia–Città della Pieve; 6 October 1988 – 26 May 1995	Succeeded by Giuseppe Chiaretti
Preceded by Dionigi Tettamanzi	Secretary-General of the Italian Episcopal Conference; 26 May 1995 – 5 April 2001	Succeeded by Giuseppe Betori
Preceded by Silvano Piovanelli	Archbishop of Florence; 21 March 2001 – 7 June 2008	Succeeded by Giuseppe Betori
Preceded by Thomas Joseph Winning	Cardinal-Priest of Sant'Andrea delle Fratte; 21 October 2003 –	Incumbent
Preceded by Alfonso López Trujillo	President of the Pontifical Council for the Family; 7 June 2008 – 26 June 2012	Succeeded by Vincenzo Paglia
