= Giuseppe Betori =

Italian Roman Catholic cardinal (born 1947)

His Eminence Giuseppe Betori
- Cardinal, Archbishop Emeritus of Florence
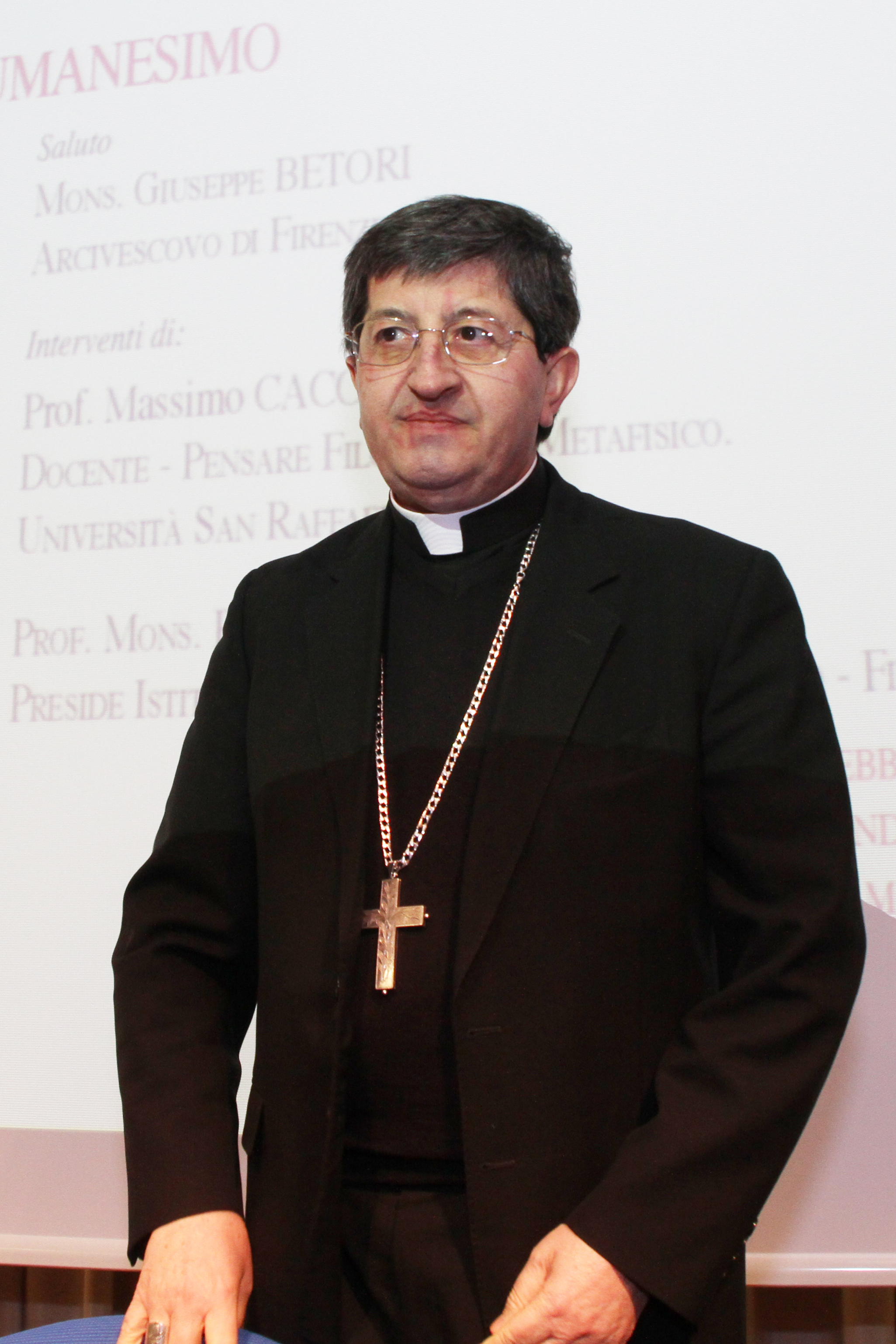
- Church: Roman Catholic Church
- Archdiocese: Florence
- See: Florence
- Appointed: 8 September 2008
- Installed: 26 October 2008
- Term ended: 18 April 2024
- Predecessor: Ennio Antonelli
- Successor: Gherardo Gambelli
- Other post: Cardinal-Priest of San Marcello (2012–)
- Previous posts: Secretary-General of the Episcopal Conference of Italy (2001–08); Titular Bishop of Falerone (2001–08); Archbishop of Florence (2008–24)

Orders
- Ordination: 26 September 1970 by Siro Silvestri
- Consecration: 6 May 2001 by Camillo Ruini
- Created cardinal: 18 February 2012 by Pope Benedict XVI
- Rank: Cardinal-Priest

Personal details
- Born: Giuseppe Betori; 25 February 1947 (age 79) Foligno, Italy
- Denomination: Roman Catholic
- Motto: Deo et Verbo Gratiae (Acts 20:32; Thanks be to God and the Word)

- Coat of arms

Styles of Giuseppe Betori
- Reference style: His Eminence
- Spoken style: Your Eminence
- Religious style: Cardinal
- Posthumous style: not applicable
- Informal style: Cardinal
- See: Florence

Giuseppe Betori (born 25 February 1947) is an Italian prelate of the Catholic Church who was Archbishop of Florence from 2008 to 2024. He became a bishop in 2001 when he was appointed secretary general of the Italian Episcopal Conference (CEI), a post he held until 2008. He was elevated to the rank of cardinal in 2012.

== Biography ==
Giuseppe Betori was born in Foligno, Italy, on 25 February 1947. He was ordained a priest on 26 September 1970. He earned a licentiate in theology at the Pontifical Gregorian University and a doctorate in Sacred Scripture at the Pontifical Biblical Institute. While serving in local parishes in Foligno he was Professor of Sacred Scripture and Dean of the Theological Institute of Assisi; diocesan assistant of Catholic Action; director of the Regional Pastoral Centre; assistant at the Youth Pastoral Center of the S. Carlo Institute in Foligno; coordinator of the Secretariat of the Ecclesiastical Conference held in Palermo in 1995; vice-president of the Italian Committee for the XV World Youth Day; and director of the Catechistic Office of the CEI. He also served as undersecretary of Italian Episcopal Conference from 1996 to 2001.

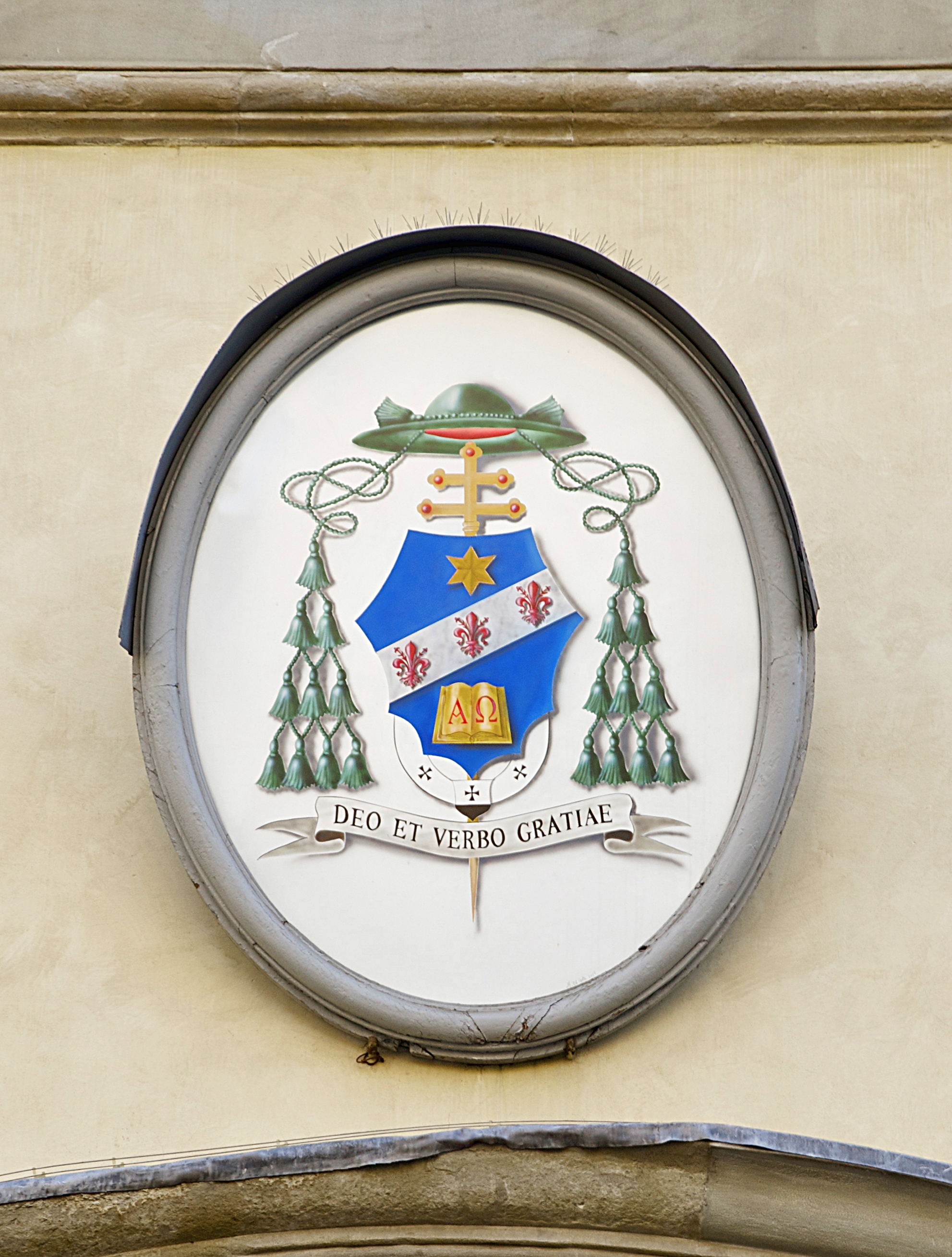
The coat of arms of H.E. Mgr Giuseppe Betori, as archbishop of Florence before his elevation to Cardinal, as seen on the façade of the archbishop's residence

On 5 April 2001, Pope John Paul II named Betori Secretary General of the Italian Episcopal Conference and Titular Bishop of Falerone. He received his episcopal consecration on 6 May 2001.

In 2005, Betori supported a ban on the ordination of homosexuals. He said this could not be called "discrimination" because a priestly vocation is a "gift" rather than a "right".

His appointment as secretary general of the CEI was confirmed for another five-year term on 6 April 2006.

Pope Benedict XVI named Betori archbishop of Florence on 8 September 2008. He ended his service as secretary general of the CEI on 25 September 2008 and was installed in Florence the next day. He was elected president of the Episcopal Conference of Tuscany on 10 February 2009.

On 5 November 2011, Betori survived an apparent assassination attempt. An unidentified man confronted him outside his office, shot and wounded his secretary, and waved a gun at Betori before fleeing. Betori and other witnesses said they could not make sense of what the gunman said or intended as he gestured toward Betori with his the gun.

On 10 December 2011 he was appointed a member of the Pontifical Council for Culture for a five-year renewable term.

On 6 January 2012, Pope Benedict announced he planned to make Betori a cardinal and Betori was made Cardinal-Priest of San Marcello on 18 February. On 21 April 2012, Betori was appointed a member of the Congregation for Catholic Education and the Pontifical Council for Culture. On 17 May 2014, Pope Francis nominated him a member of the Pontifical Council of the Laity.

He was one of the cardinal electors who participated in the 2013 papal conclave that elected Pope Francis and the 2025 papal conclave that elected Pope Leo XIV.

Pope Francis accepted his resignation as archbishop of Florence on 18 April 2024.

Catholic Church titles
| Preceded by Damião António Franklin | — TITULAR — Titular Bishop of Falerone; 5 April 2001 – 8 September 2008 | Succeeded by Luigi Bianco |
| Preceded by Ennio Antonelli | Secretary General of the Italian Episcopal Conference; 5 April 2001 – 8 September 2008 | Succeeded by Mariano Crociata |
| Preceded by Ennio Antonelli | Archbishop of Florence; 8 September 2008 – 18 April 2024 | Succeeded by Gherardo Gambelli |
| Preceded by Agustín García-Gasco y Vicente | Cardinal-Priest of San Marcello; 18 February 2012 – | Incumbent |
