= Silvano Piovanelli =

Catholic cardinal

His Eminence Silvano Piovanelli
- Cardinal, Archbishop Emeritus of Florence
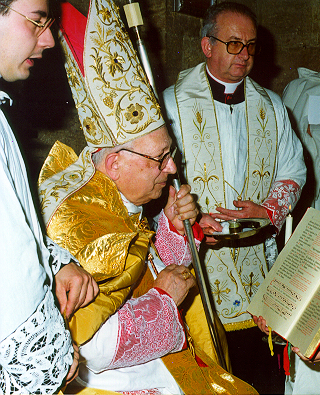
- Church: Catholic Church
- Archdiocese: Florence
- Installed: 18 March 1983
- Term ended: 21 March 2001
- Predecessor: Giovanni Benelli
- Successor: Ennio Antonelli
- Other post: Cardinal-Priest of Santa Maria delle Grazie a Via Trionfale (1985–2016)
- Previous post: Auxiliary Bishop of Florence (1982–1983)

Orders
- Ordination: 13 July 1947 by Elia Dalla Costa
- Consecration: 24 June 1982 by Giovanni Benelli
- Created cardinal: 25 May 1985 by John Paul II
- Rank: Cardinal-Priest

Personal details
- Born: 21 February 1924 Borgo San Lorenzo, Kingdom of Italy
- Died: 9 July 2016 (aged 92) Florence, Italy
- Denomination: Catholic
- Education: University of Florence
- Motto: In verbo Tuo

- Coat of arms

Silvano Piovanelli (21 February 1924 – 9 July 2016) was an Italian cardinal of the Catholic Church. He served as Archbishop of Florence from 1983 to 2001, and was elevated to the cardinalate in 1985.

== Biography ==
Silvano Piovanelli was born in Borgo San Lorenzo, in the province of Florence, on 21 February 1924. He studied at the seminary of Florence from 1935 to 1947, and was ordained to the priesthood by Cardinal Elia Dalla Costa on 13 July 1947. He then served as a curate in the industrial town of Rifredi until October 1948, when he became vice-rector of minor seminary of Florence. He resumed his pastoral ministry in 1961 as a parish priest in Castelfiorentino, and was raised to the rank of Chaplain of His Holiness on 26 October 1966. From 1979 to 1982, he was vicar general of the Archdiocese of Florence.

On 28 May 1982, Piovanelli was appointed Auxiliary Bishop of Florence and Titular Bishop of Tubunae in Mauretania by Pope John Paul II. He received his episcopal consecration on the following 24 June from Cardinal Giovanni Benelli, with Bishops Antonio Bagnoli and Giovanni Bianchi serving as co-consecrators, at the Cathedral-Basilica of Santa Maria del Fiore. He selected as his episcopal motto: "In Verbo Tuo". Following the unexpected death of Cardinal Benelli in October 1982, Piovanelli was promoted to Archbishop of Florence on 18 March 1983. John Paul II created him Cardinal-Priest of S. Maria delle Grazie a Via Trionfale in the consistory of 25 May 1985.

After an 18-year-long tenure, he retired as Archbishop on 21 March 2001. He lost the right to participate in a papal conclave upon reaching the age of 80 on 21 February 2004.

Piovanelli died in his sleep on the morning of 9 July 2016 at the age of 92, after three months hospitalisation in a Florence retirement home for priests. Days before his death, he was telephoned by Pope Francis on the pontiff's visit to the city. His funeral Mass was celebrated in the late afternoon of 12 July 2016 by cardinal Giuseppe Betori and his remains were buried in Santa Maria del Fiore cathedral.

Catholic Church titles
Preceded by Giovanni Benelli	Archbishop of Florence; 18 March 1983 – 21 March 2001	Succeeded by Ennio Antonelli
