= Ermenegildo Florit =

Italian cardinal

His Eminence Ermenegildo Florit
- Cardinal, Archbishop Emeritus of Florence
- Church: Roman Catholic Church
- Archdiocese: Florence
- See: Florence
- Appointed: 9 March 1962
- Term ended: 3 June 1977
- Predecessor: Elia Dalla Costa
- Successor: Giovanni Benelli
- Other post: Cardinal-Priest of Regina Apostolorum (1965–85)
- Previous posts: Titular Archbishop of Hierapolis in Syria (1954–62); Coadjutor Archbishop of Florence (1954–62)

Orders
- Ordination: 11 April 1925
- Consecration: 12 September 1954 by Clemente Micara
- Created cardinal: 22 February 1965 by Pope Paul VI
- Rank: Cardinal-Priest

Personal details
- Born: Ermenegildo Florit; 5 July 1901 Fagagna, Kingdom of Italy
- Died: 8 December 1985 (aged 84) Florence, Italy
- Education: Pontifical Roman Seminary; Pontifical Biblical Institute; Pontifical Lateran University
- Motto: Incrementum dat Deus
- Coat of arms

Styles of Ermenegildo Florit
- Reference style: His Eminence
- Spoken style: Your Eminence
- Informal style: Cardinal
- See: Florence (emeritus)

Ermenegildo Florit (5 July 1901 – 8 December 1985) was an Italian cardinal of the Roman Catholic Church. He served as Archbishop of Florence from 1962 to 1977, and was elevated to the cardinalate in 1965.

== Biography ==
Ermenegildo Florit was born in Fagagna, and attended the seminary in Udine, the Pontifical Roman Seminary, and the Pontifical Biblical Institute and Pontifical Lateran University in Rome. Before finishing his studies in 1927, he was ordained to the priesthood on 11 April 1925. Florit served as a professor (1929–1954) and later the dean of theology and vice-rector (1951–1954) at the Pontifical Lateran University, while also doing pastoral work in Rome. In 1951, he was made a canon of St. Mark's Basilica and, on 21 August, a domestic prelate of his holiness.

On 12 July 1954, Florit was appointed Coadjutor Archbishop of Florence and Titular Archbishop of Hierapolis in Syria. He received his episcopal consecration on the following 12 September from Cardinal Clemente Micara, with Archbishop Luigi Traglia and Bishop Emilio Pizzoni serving as co-consecrators, in the Lateran Basilica. Florit succeeded the late Elia Dalla Costa as Archbishop of Florence on 9 March 1962, and then attended the Second Vatican Council until 1965. During the council, he was heavily involved with the drafting of Dei verbum, the Dogmatic Constitution on Divine Revelation.

Pope Paul VI created him Cardinal-Priest of Regina Apostolorum in the consistory of 22 February 1965. In 1968, the cardinal engaged in a dispute with the popular Florentine priest Enzo Mazzi, whose rebellious attitude the former saw as a threat to "ecclesiastical unity". Resigning as Florence's archbishop on 3 June 1977, Florit was one of the cardinal electors who participated in the conclaves of August and October 1978, which selected Popes John Paul I and John Paul II respectively.

He died in Florence, at age 84, and is buried in the Basilica of Santa Maria del Fiore.

Catholic Church titles
Preceded by Elia Dalla Costa	Archbishop of Florence; 1962–1977	Succeeded by Giovanni Benelli
