= Satafi =

Africa Roman map

Satafi (Latin: Satafensis), was a Roman town in the Roman province of Mauretania Caesariensis, North Africa. It lasted through the Vandal Kingdom and Roman Empire, until at least the Muslim conquest of the Maghreb, in late antiquity. An exact location of the town is not known but, it was probably in Algeria.

Like most of Mauretania Caesariensis, Christianity appears to have been not well established until after the Council of Nicaea. A bishop of Satafi, Ascendant, took part in the synod assembled in Carthage in 484 by the Vandal King Huneric, after which Ascendant was exiled to Sicily. A Donatist bishop called Saiacensis or Saiensis, has also been attributed to this town but instead he was probably from Saia Maggiore. Today Satafi retains a titular bishopric held by Eduardo Muñoz Ochoa, of Guadalajara, Jalisco.
