= Santa Maria e Santa Brigida al Paradiso =

Church building in Florence, Italy

Coordinates: 43.750637°N 11.284292°E

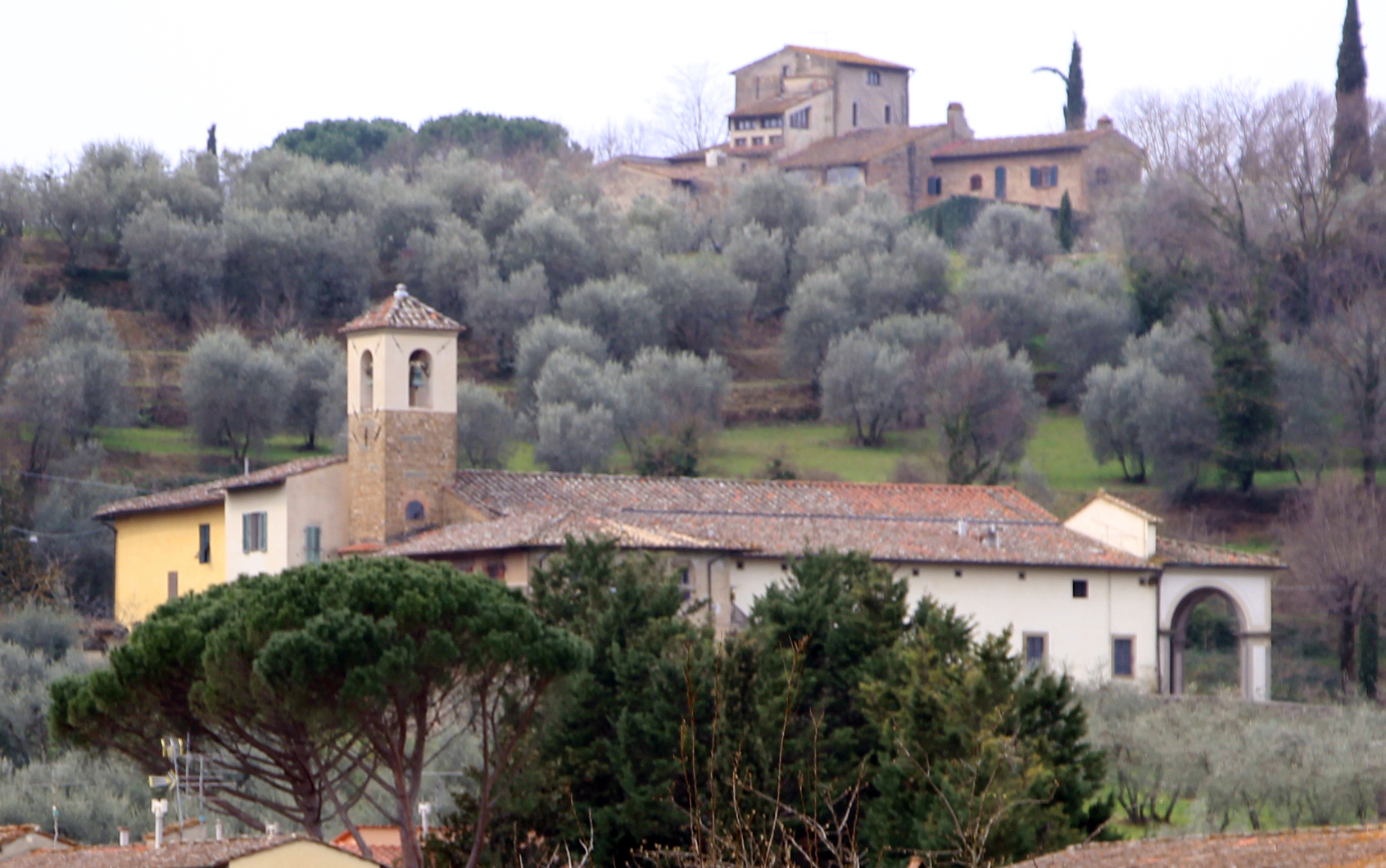
- Church with apse belltower on hillside

Religion
- Affiliation: Roman Catholic

Location
- Location: Florence, Italy
- Interactive map of Santa Maria e Santa Brigida al Paradiso

Architecture
- Type: Church
- Style: Romanesque

Santa Maria e Santa Brigida al Paradiso is a Roman Catholic parish church located on via Benedetto Fortini in the quartiere of Gavinana in the zone of Paradiso, just south of the urban center of Florence, region of Tuscany, Italy. The church is also known as Santi Maria e Brigida alla Badiuzza di Fabroro

== History ==
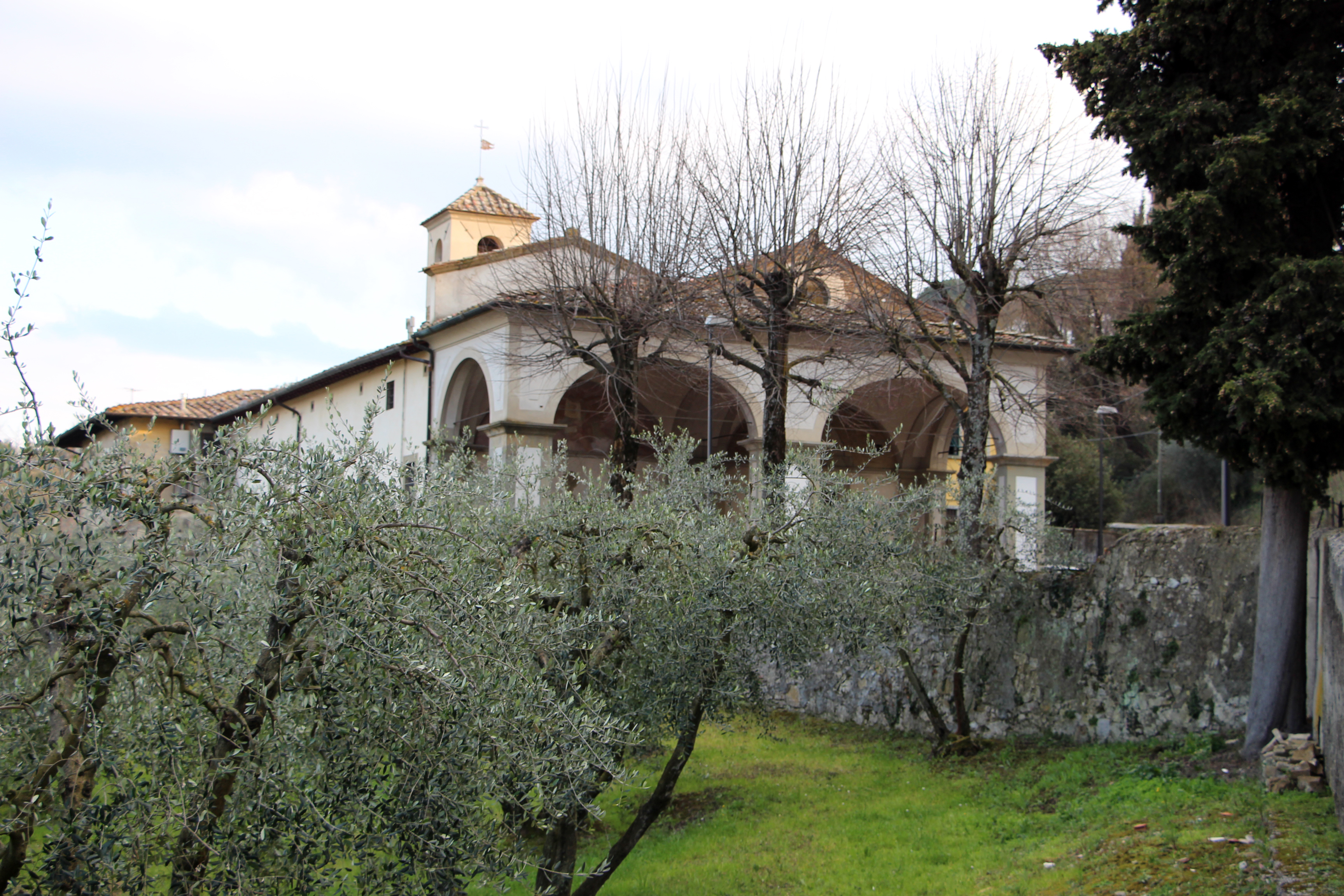
Facade with portico

By the 12th-century, a group of reformed Benedictines known as Scalzi Pulsanesi had a small abbey here with attached church. The abbey was dependent on a monastery in Montici. Neither convent prospered, and in 1305, the monks briefly abandoned the monastery, then known as Badiuzza di Santa Maria di Fabroro, that was prone to much damage due to the wars that reigned and its location in the midst of a perverse nation By 1416, this small monastery and church were transferred to the female Benedictine convent of Santa Brigida al Paradiso, located just down the hill. That monastery was suppressed in 1776 and the abbey church was deconsecrated.

The Romanesque-style church layout is simple: it consists of a single long nave, oriented with the facade facing east, with high narrow windows. The apse is a semicircular half dome with a single window. The portico (1706) has some frescoes; the poorly conserved Madonna and Child was attributed to Pier Dandini. To the left of the nave, a wooden 15th-century Christ of the Cross is attributed to Bernardo della Cecca.
