= Bruno Fanciullacci =

Italian anti-fascist partisan

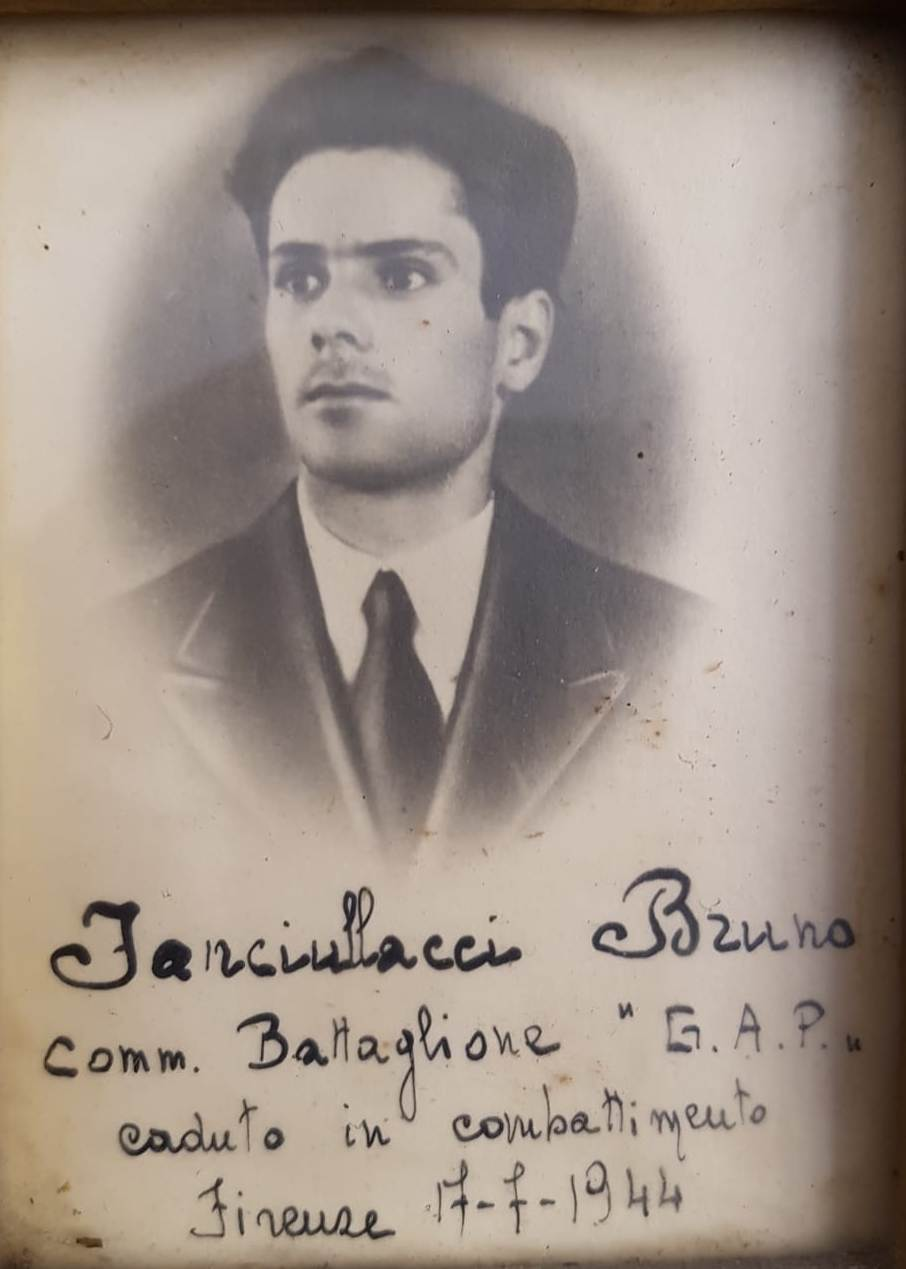
- Born: 13 November 1919; Pieve a Nievole, Pistoia, Tuscany, Italy
- Died: 17 July 1944 (aged 24); Florence, Tuscany, Italy
- Resting place: Soffiano Cemetery
- Other name: Massimo
- Citizenship: Italy
- Known for: Assassination of Giovanni Gentile
- Political party: Gruppi di Azione Patriottica
- Awards: Medal of Military Valor

Bruno Fanciullacci (Italian pronunciation: [ˈbruːno fantʃulˈlattʃi]; 13 November 1919 – 17 July 1944) was an Italian Partisan during World War II. During the Italian Civil War, he co-founded the Gruppi di Azione Patriottica (GAP), a Communist partisan organisation. He was involved in the assassination of the "Philosopher of Fascism" Giovanni Gentile in April 1944.

== Early life and political activities ==
Bruno Fanciullacci was born in the village of Pieve a Nievole in rural Tuscany in 1919 to Raffaello and Rosa Michelini. The family moved to Florence in 1932 after his father was left unemployed due to his anti-fascist leanings. The young Fanciullacci worked as a milkman and as an elevator boy at the Grand Hotel Cavour. He established contact with clandestine anti-fascist networks at age 16, getting arrested in 1938 and being sentenced to 7 years in prison for "subversive activities" including the distribution of left-wing pamphlets and posters.

Upon the fall of Fascism in July 1943, Fanciullacci was released from prison, joining the Partisans against Republic of Salò troops in the civil war 2 months later, choosing "Massimo" as his nom de guerre. He proceeded to co-found the Gruppi di Azione Patriottica (The Patriotic Action Groups or GAP, known in Italian as the Gappisti).

On 14 January 1944, Fanciullacci disguised himself as a Fascist militia officer and gained entry to the Fascist Party Florence headquarters, placing a bomb which killed two and injured others. In the following months, he participated in several small-scale attacks against Fascist targets.

== Assassination of Giovanni Gentile ==
After the 22 March 1944 execution of the Martyrs of Campo di Marte, the self-proclaimed "Philosopher of Fascism" and key figure of Benito Mussolini's Fascist government Giovanni Gentile received a death threat in the form of a letter, now believed to have been sent by Fanciullacci or his GAP associates. It read:

Tu come esponente del neofascismo sei responsabile dell'assassinio dei cinque giovani al mattino del 22 marzo 1944.
As an exponent of neo-fascism, you are responsible for the murder of the five young men on the morning of 22 March 1944.

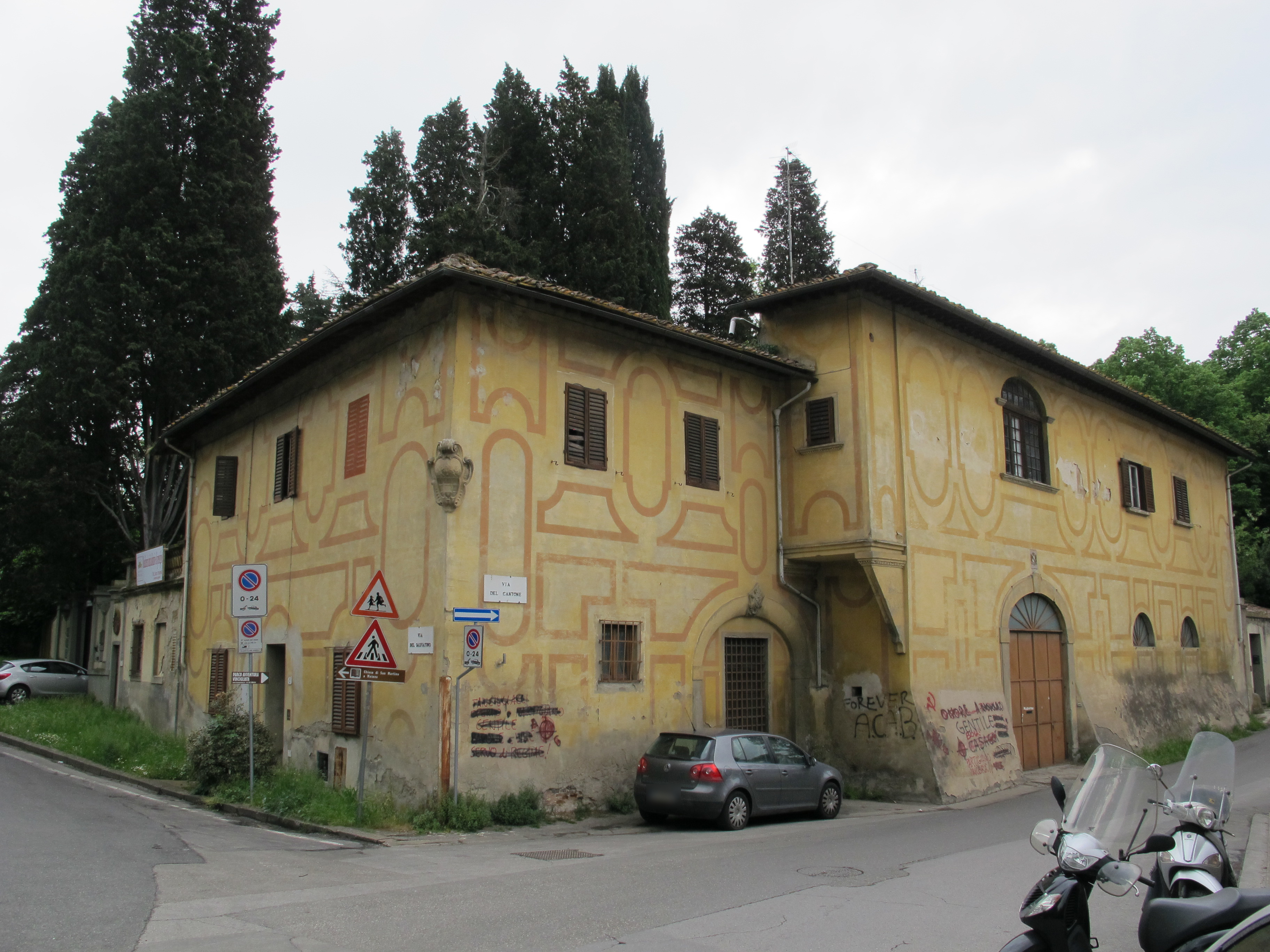
Villa di Montalto in Florence, location of Giovanni Gentile's assassination. Fascist and Communist graffiti honouring and denouncing Gentile, respectively, is visible.

On 15 April, Gentile sat in his car in Florence when he was approached by Fanciullacci and an associate (said to be either Antonio Ignesti or Giuseppe Martini), both hiding pistols under books, when Gentile rolled down the car's window, he was shot several times in the chest by the assassins, and died shortly afterwards.

Some historians have claimed that, while shooting Gentile, Fanciullacci exclaimed: "I don't kill the man, but his ideas!". According to other sources, Fanciullacci said: "This is sent by popular justice!"

Fanciullacci was captured on 26 April and tortured by Mario Carità before being rescued by his GAP comrade Elio Chianesi on 8 May after a failed attempt on 4 May. He was hidden at the house of the painter Ottone Rosai to avoid recapture and to recover from injuries sustained during captivity (including several stab wounds).

The assassination was criticized by the Partisan movement's Tuscany leadership, with the exception of the Communist Party, which approved.

== Subsequent activity, capture and death ==
On 9 July 1944, Bruno Fanciullacci and Elio Chianesi led a GAP squadron in a raid against the Santa Verdiana monastery, where some anti-fascists were being held prisoner. They succeeded in liberating 17 prisoners, including future Florence city councillor and Italian Communist Party activist Tosca Bucarelli.

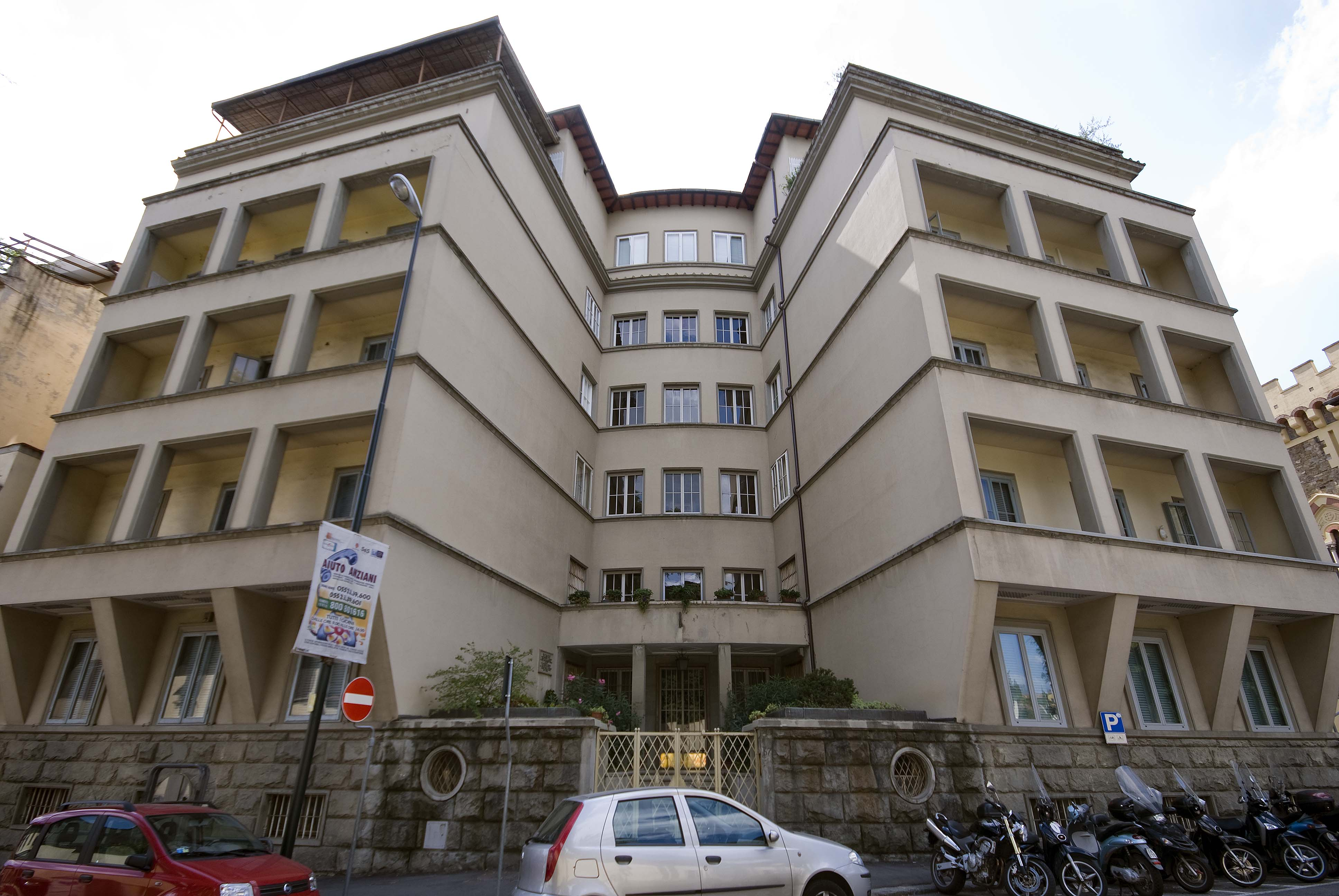
Villa Triste in Florence, the location of Bruno Fanciullacci's interrogation and death

A few days later, Fanciullacci and Chianesi were captured by Mario Carità's Fascist forces in a trap set at the Piazza Santa Croce, having hidden themselves in an ambulance car. Chianesi was tortured to death on 15 July, while Fanciullacci was heavily injured while attempting escape on 17 July. He jumped out of the window of the Villa Triste where he was held for interrogation, and suffered a fractured skull. As he lay unconscious, he was shot dead by the Fascist guards at point-blank range. Later that day, Mario Carità's forces committed the Piazza Tasso massacre, during which 5 were killed and 17 arrested and executed six days later on suspicion of Partisan activity.

== See also ==
- Garibaldi Brigade
- Italian Civil War
