= Alfonso Mistrangelo =

Italian prelate of the Catholic Church (1952–1930)

His Eminence Alfonso Mistrangelo Sch. P.
- Cardinal, Archbishop of Florence
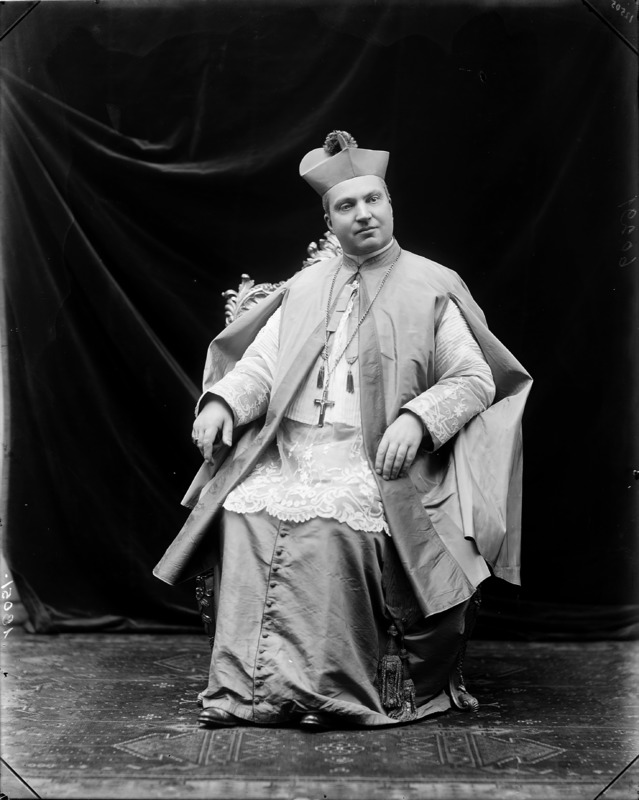
- Church: Catholic Church
- Archdiocese: Florence
- See: Florence
- Appointed: 19 June 1899
- Term ended: 7 November 1930
- Predecessor: Agostino Bausa
- Successor: Elia Dalla Costa
- Other post: Cardinal-Priest of Santa Maria degli Angeli (1915–30)
- Previous posts: Bishop of Pontremoli (1893–99); Superior General of the Piarists (1900–04)

Orders
- Ordination: 17 March 1877
- Consecration: 22 January 1893 by Lucido Maria Parocchi
- Created cardinal: 6 December 1915 by Pope Benedict XV
- Rank: Cardinal-Priest

Personal details
- Born: Alfonso Maria Mistrangelo; 26 April 1852 Savona, Kingdom of Piedmont-Sardinia
- Died: 7 November 1930 (aged 78) Florence, Kingdom of Italy

Styles of Alfonso Mistrangelo
- Reference style: His Eminence
- Spoken style: Your Eminence
- Informal style: Cardinal
- See: Florence

Alfonso Maria Mistrangelo Sch. P. (26 April 1852 – 7 November 1930) was an Italian prelate of the Catholic Church. He served as Archbishop of Florence from 1899 until his death, and was elevated to the cardinalate in 1915. He was also a member of the Piarists religious congregation.

== Biography ==
Alfonso Mistrangelo was born in Savona, and received the sacrament of confirmation on 17 May 1859. He studied at the seminary in Savona before entering the Congregation of the Clerics Poor Regular of the Mother of God of the Pious Schools, more commonly known as the Piarists, on 23 October 1870, in Liguria. Educated at Piarist houses of study from 1870 to 1877, Mistrangelo made his simple profession in 1871, and his solemn profession in 1874.

He received the tonsure and other insignias of the clerical character on 28 February 1875, the subdiaconate on 13 May 1875, and the diaconate on 18 July 1875. Mistrangelo was ordained to the priesthood on 17 March 1877, and then taught at the Piarist schools of Finalborgo, Carcare, and Ovada. In 1880, he became the rector of the Piarist school in Ovada.

On 16 January 1893, Mistrangelo was appointed Bishop of Pontremoli by Pope Leo XIII. He received his episcopal consecration on the following 11 May from Cardinal Lucido Parocchi, with Archbishop Antonio Grasselli OFM Conv, and Bishop Luigi Canestrari serving as co-consecrators, in the Church of San Pantaleone.

Mistrangelo was later promoted to archbishop of Florence on 19 June 1899, and served as superior general of the Piarists from 1900 to 1904 as well. Pope Benedict XV created him cardinal-priest of S. Maria degli Angeli in the consistory of 6 December 1915. He was one of the cardinal electors who participated in the 1922 papal conclave, which selected Pope Pius XI.

Cardinal Mistrangelo died from gastric poisoning in Florence, at the age of 78; his tenure as archbishop lasted for thirty-one years. He is buried in the Cimitero di Soffiano.

Catholic Church titles
Preceded by David Camilli	Bishop of Pontremoli; 1893–1899	Succeeded by Angelo Fiorini
Preceded by Agostino Bausa	Archbishop of Florence; 1899–1930	Succeeded by Elia Dalla Costa
