= Piero Antonio Toma =

Italian journalist, writer and publisher (1935–2026)

- Born: 1935; Tuglie, Apulia, Italy
- Died: 5 April 2026 (aged 91); Naples, Campania, Italy
- Citizenship: Italy
- Occupations: Journalist, writer, publisher
- Notable work: Giornali e giornalisti a Napoli 1799–1999; Il silenzio dei giusti. Napoli 1943. Il ritorno degli Ebrei; Dal Mezzogiorno al Mediterraneo, il lungo tempo della rinascita

Piero Antonio Toma (1935 – 5 April 2026) was an Italian journalist, writer and publisher. Based mainly in Naples, he worked for Il Sole 24 Ore, later contributed to la Repubblica, founded the press agency Informedia in 1984, and in 2005 co-founded the publishing house Compagnia dei Trovatori.

== Life and career ==
Toma was born in Tuglie, in the Province of Lecce, and later moved to Naples. He graduated in political science at the University of Naples and began his career in journalism and communications working first for Tirrenia and then for Finmare in Rome as head of press office.

After returning to Naples, Toma became a correspondent for Il Sole 24 Ore. In 1984, he founded Informedia together with Antonio Filippetti and Vittorio Bongiorno. Through Informedia and related publishing activities, he directed or helped direct periodicals including Gazzetta della Campania, Napoli Guide, Vomero News, and Leggere leggero.

In 2005, Toma co-founded the publishing house Compagnia dei Trovatori with Vittorio Bongiorno and writer Nando Vitali. In later years, he contributed to the Naples cultural pages of la Repubblica.

Toma died in Naples on 5 April 2026, at the age of 91.

== Works ==
Toma wrote fiction, poetry, essays, and historical works; publisher and author profiles described him as the author of about fifteen books. His work often focused on the history of Naples, southern Italy, and local journalism.

One of his best-known books was Il silenzio dei giusti. Napoli 1943. Il ritorno degli Ebrei (2004), about the protection of Jewish internees and evacuees in Tora e Piccilli during the Second World War.

=== Selected works ===
- Storia del porto di Napoli (1991)
- Renato Caccioppoli. L'enigma (1992)
- Armatori meridionali ieri e oggi (with Bianca D'Antonio, 1992)
- Giornali e giornalisti a Napoli 1799–1999 (1999)
- Cronache metropolitane. Viaggio nella provincia di Napoli dal 1995 al 2003 (2004)
- Il silenzio dei giusti. Napoli 1943. Il ritorno degli Ebrei (2004)
- Dal Mezzogiorno al Mediterraneo, il lungo tempo della rinascita (2015)
- Il grande albergo degli scienziati. Centocinquanta anni della Stazione Zoologica Anton Dohrn (2022)
- Una casa per tornare. Storie di emigrazione (2023)

== Honors and recognition ==
In 2015, Toma received the Premio giornalistico Antonio Maglio alla carriera. In 2017, his book Dal Mezzogiorno al Mediterraneo, il lungo tempo della rinascita received the Premio internazionale Francesco Saverio Nitti per il Mediterraneo.
