= Marcello Serrazanetti =

Italian aviator, soldier and politician

- Serrazanetti in Janale during the 1930s

Secretary of the National Fascist Party for Somalia
- In office 1929–1934
- Federal Secretary of the National Fascist Party of Mogadishu
- In office 1928–1929

Personal details
- Born: 31 October 1888 Sant'Agata Bolognese, Kingdom of Italy
- Died: 5 April 1941 (aged 52) Waliso, Ethiopia
- Party: National Fascist Party

Military service
- Allegiance: Kingdom of Italy
- Branch/service: Royal Italian Army
- Battles/wars: World War I; Battles of the Isonzo; World War II; East African campaign
- Awards: Silver Medal of Military Valor; War Merit Cross; Order of the Crown of Italy

Marcello Serrazanetti (Sant'Agata Bolognese, 31 October 1888 – Waliso, 5 April 1941) was an Italian aviator, soldier and Fascist politician, secretary of the National Fascist Party in Somalia.

== Biography ==
=== Aviation pioneer ===
He was born in Sant'Agata Bolognese on 31 October 1888 from a wealthy family of monarchist traditions, and after completing his studies he helped his father Gaspare in the management of a large agricultural estate belonging to the counts of Montpensier, becoming a passionate breeder of horses and dogs and writing a manual for the training of police dogs. He participated in numerous horse riding competitions, both in Italy and abroad.

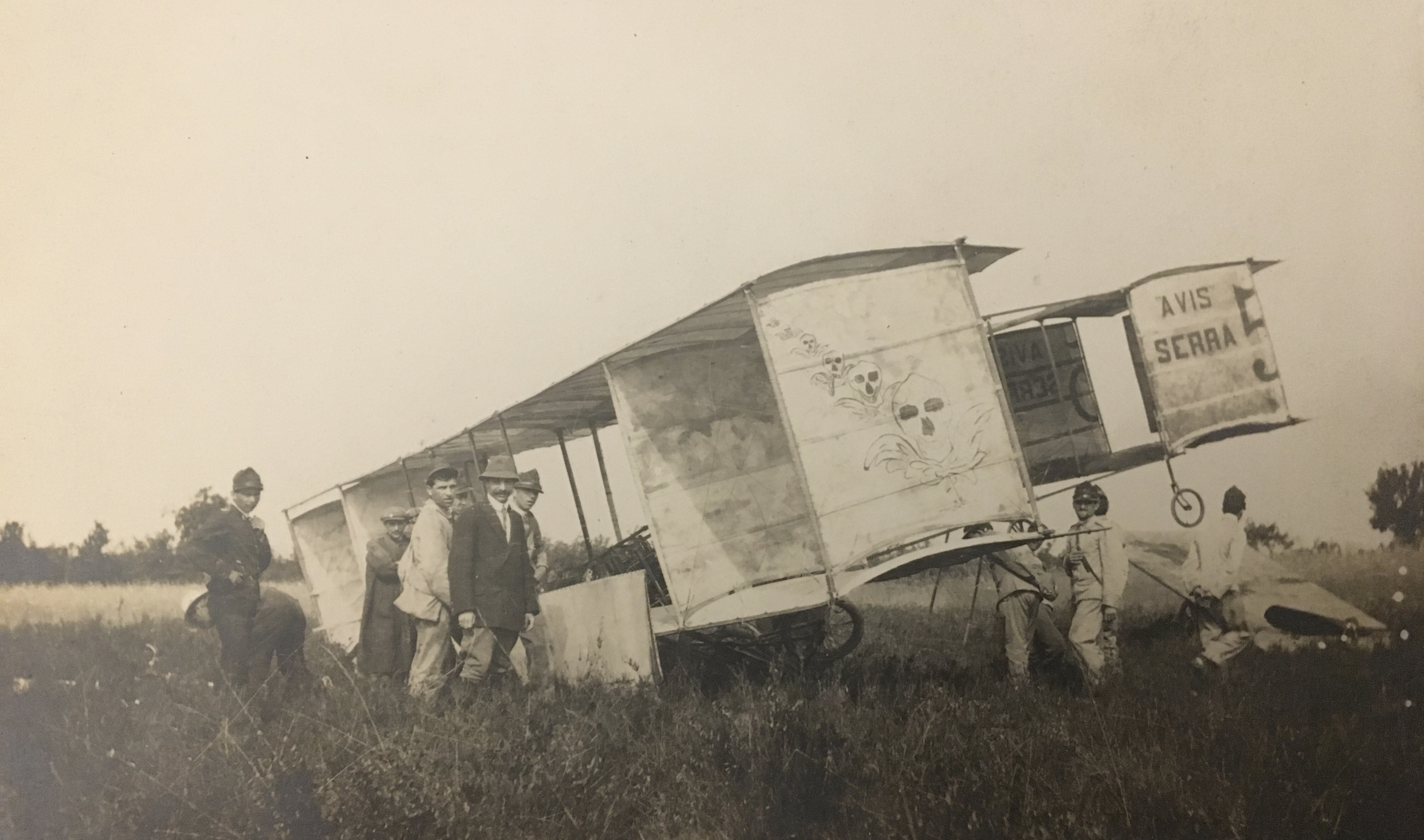
Serrazanetti's AVIS aircraft

Since his youth he showed an adventurous spirit and great curiosity for technical innovations, soon developing an interest in the world of aviation. Between the end of 1909 and 1910, Serrazanetti became one of the first instructors, together with Pasquale Bianchi and Alessandro Cagno, at the newly established Cameri airfield. He made his first flight on an AVIS aircraft, built by a small company in Brescia, founded by the French engineer Clovis Thouvenot, who made biplanes under license from Avions Voisin, equipping them with an Isotta Fraschini engine. Serrazanetti bought one of these aircraft at the 1st Italian Aviation Exhibition, held in Milan on 15 November 1909, equipping it with a 50 HP engine. Taking off from the Cameri airfield on 1 May 1910, he ventured with his plane among the units of the 17th Field Artillery Regiment that were carrying out an exercise just outside the flying area; the aircraft's propeller suddenly stopped working and the aircraft crashed into a tree and was almost completely destroyed, but Serrazanetti was only slightly injured.

He then built a hangar in Prateria di Cortile, a hamlet of Carpi, in order to shelter and repair his damaged AVIS aircraft; this became the Cortile airfield, the third airfield ever built in Italy, after those of Cameri and of Centocelle. On 31 July 1911, he made a second flight, covering a distance of about 500 meters. On 24 August of the same year, he attempted a third flight of six kilometres from Prateria di Cortile to Rolo, where he picked up his friend Guido Corni; he then flew back for about three kilometres. On 26 June 1912 he took off from Verona with three of his friends, Nico Piccoli, Umberto Sanguinetti and Alberico Camporesi, on an aerostat named Libia; the four planned to fly to Budapest, but exhaustion and low temperatures forced them to land in the Hungarian town of Buek, on the border with Austria. On 12 February 1914, Serrazanetti married Adelaide Bonaghi, a girl from the upper bourgeoisie of Bologna, who later gave him two children.

=== World War I and Fascist period ===
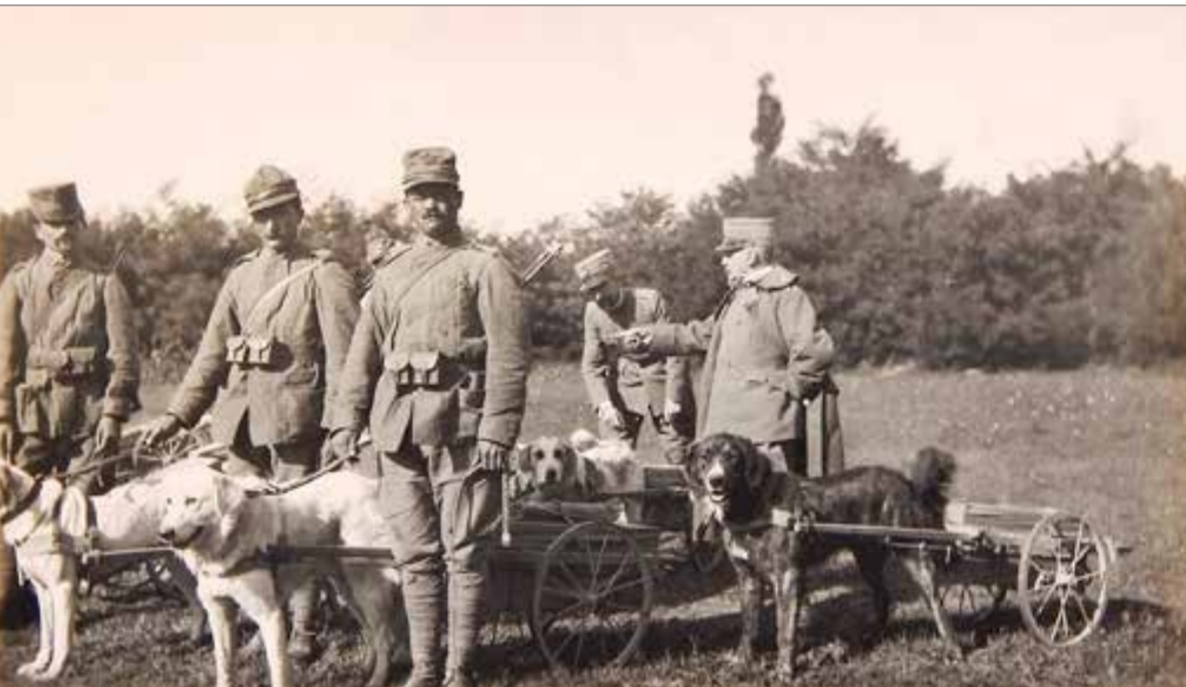
Serrazanetti's dog training school in Castenaso during the First World War

A convinced interventionist, Serrazanetti enlisted as a one-year volunteer in the 12th Cavalry Regiment Cavalleggeri di Saluzzo during the First World War. Having later become an artillery sergeant major, he was wounded on Mount Podgora, near Gorizia, during the Third Battle of the Isonzo and was awarded the Silver Medal of Military Valor. He was later further awarded a War Merit Cross.

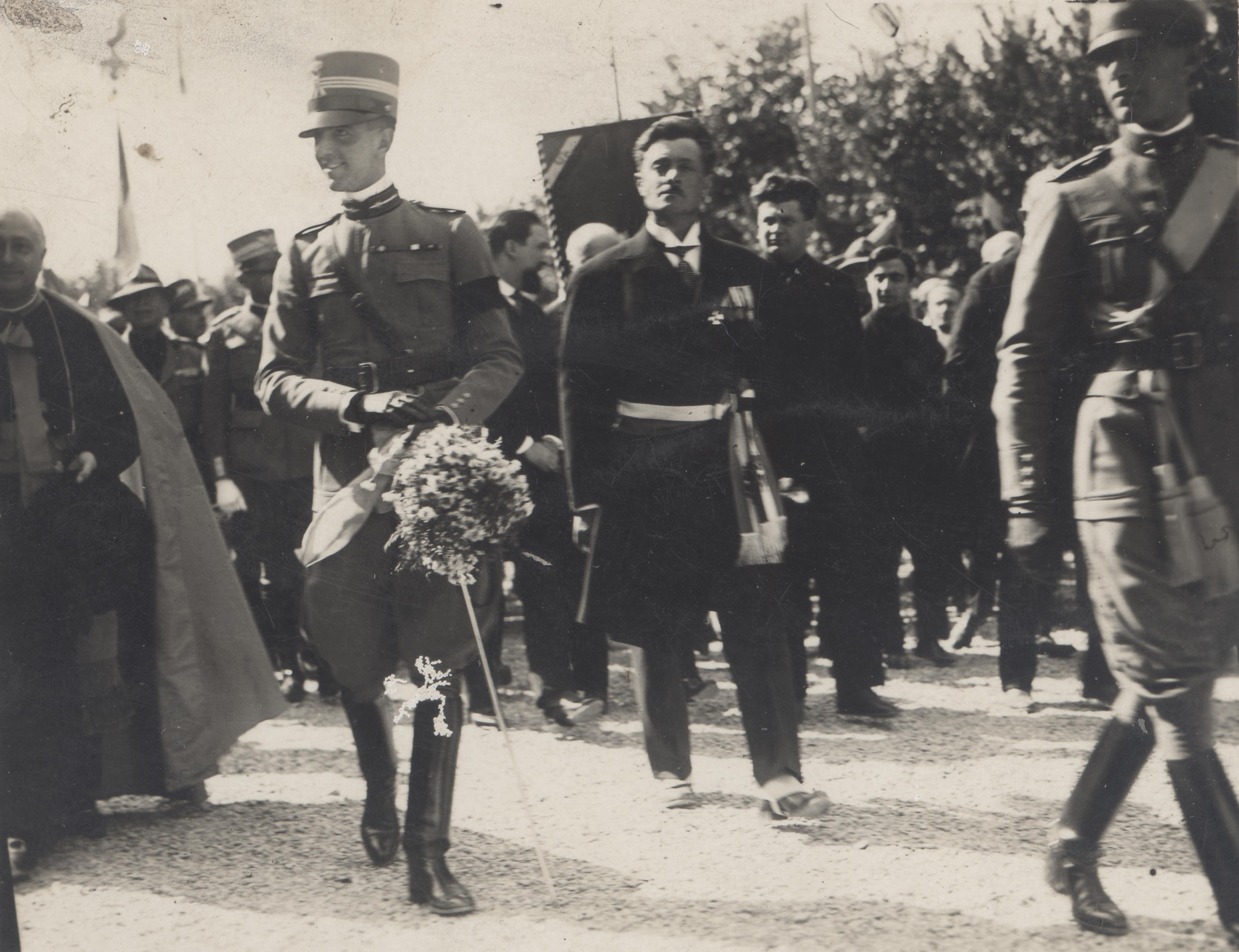
Serrazanetti with Dino Grandi and Leandro Arpinati during Crown Prince Umberto's visit to Bologna in July 1926

An early member of the Fascist movement, a few months after the dissolution of the first Bologna section of the Italian Fasces of Combat, in July 1919 Serrazanetti founded the second local section, along with his friends Leandro Arpinati and Gino Baroncini. He was a squadrista in Bologna during the Biennio Rosso, and participated in the March on Rome. After the resignation of the Socialist municipal council of Sant'Agata Bolognese, which took place on 2 May 1921 following the April clashes between Socialists and Fascists in the Bologna area, which had caused numerous deaths and injuries on both sides, the municipality was managed by a Commissioner sent by the Prefecture and in the subsequent elections of 7 May 1923 Serrazanetti was elected mayor of his hometown. He then became deputy federal secretary of the National Fascist Party of Bologna from 1925 to 1928.

At the end of 1928, Serrazanetti moved to Africa, to which he had always been attracted, becoming an agricultural inspector in Somalia, where he started a large-scale silkworm culture. In the same year, he was appointed Federal Secretary of the Mogadishu section of the National Fascist Party, and in 1929 he became Secretary of the PNF in Somalia, being awarded the title of Officer of the Order of the Crown of Italy in July 1930. He was however harshly critical of the Italian colonial policy in Somalia, which imposed a regime of forced labour on the native population, presenting it as a "work contract" in the reports and relations of governors and the speeches of ministers. In one of the many reports he wrote to Mussolini between 1931 and 1933 he wrote:

The forced labour which for some years has been imposed on the natives of Somalia, to no avail cynically disguised in 1929 with a contract of employment, is far worse than true slavery, as the indigenous worker has been stripped of the valid protection of the slave which was entailed by his venal value, protection that granted him at least the minimum of care that the lowliest of the carters has for his donkey, in the worry of having to buy another if it dies. While in Somalia, when the native assigned to a concession dies or becomes unable to work, their replacement is immediately requested from the competent government office which provides it free of charge.

He also denounced the behaviour of governors like Cesare de Vecchi, who according to him had created real "gold cribs". His critique of Italian policy in Somalia, which he compared to the colonial policies of other countries, resulted in him being forced to resign from the post of federal secretary of the PNF in 1934. Due to his numerous public complaints about influential figures of the Fascist regime as well as his loyalty to Arpinati, who had meanwhile fallen out of favour, Serrazanetti soon antagonized then-secretary of the PNF Achille Starace, who forced him to return to Italy. Back in Bologna, he became deputy secretary of the local fascist federation, alongside Mario Ghinelli.

In July 1934 Arpinati was expelled from the party; when news of this spread many of his friends, including Serrazanetti and Arconovaldo Bonaccorsi, went to his home as a sign of solidarity. In the same month, a special commission sentenced Arpinati to five years of confinement, and a few days later the positions of his friends were also examined; among them Serrazanetti, Marcello Reggiani, Antonio Bedogni, Enrico Gelati and Giuseppe Vittorio Venturi were sentenced to five years of confinement in Sardinia, for "giving solidarity, displaying attitudes in stark contrast to the traditionally fascist spirit, to a party member eliminated from the ranks for having notoriously placed himself against the directives of the PNF". In response to the sentence, Serrazanetti was said to have replied: "I will buy a donkey, and I will name it Achille" (referring to Starace). Following the personal intervention of Mussolini, however, all of the convicted, except Arpinati, were released after a few months. Serrazanetti returned to Bologna already in October 1934, but upon realizing that he could no longer operate politically in Bologna due to the climate created by the Starace clique, in 1938 he decided to move back to Somalia.

=== World War II and death ===
In June 1940, immediately after Italy entered into the Second World War, Serrazanetti enlisted in the Royal Corps of Colonial Troops, participating in the following month in the conquest of the Sudanese town of Kassala. In early 1941 the British counteroffensive resulted in the collapse of the Italian empire in East Africa; on 3 April 1941 Addis Ababa was abandoned, with the Duke of Aosta, Viceroy of Italian East Africa, retreating towards the Amba Alagi with his staff and surviving troops. The viceregal command, while leaving Addis Ababa, decided to transfer some important documents to Jimma, and Serrazanetti volunteered for the mission. On 4 April he left for Jimma at the head of a group of six Italian soldiers, but after marching for eighty kilometres, the party ran into a group of Ethiopian guerrillas, which blocked their way. Serrazanetti handed over the documents to his soldiers, ordering them to continue towards Jimma (where they safely arrived) on a different path, and remained behind to keep the Arbegnoch busy, armed with two rifles and some hand grenades. His lifeless body, surrounded by Ethiopian spears, was found two days later by passing Italian trucks.
