= Tosca Bucarelli Martini =

Italian Partisan and politician

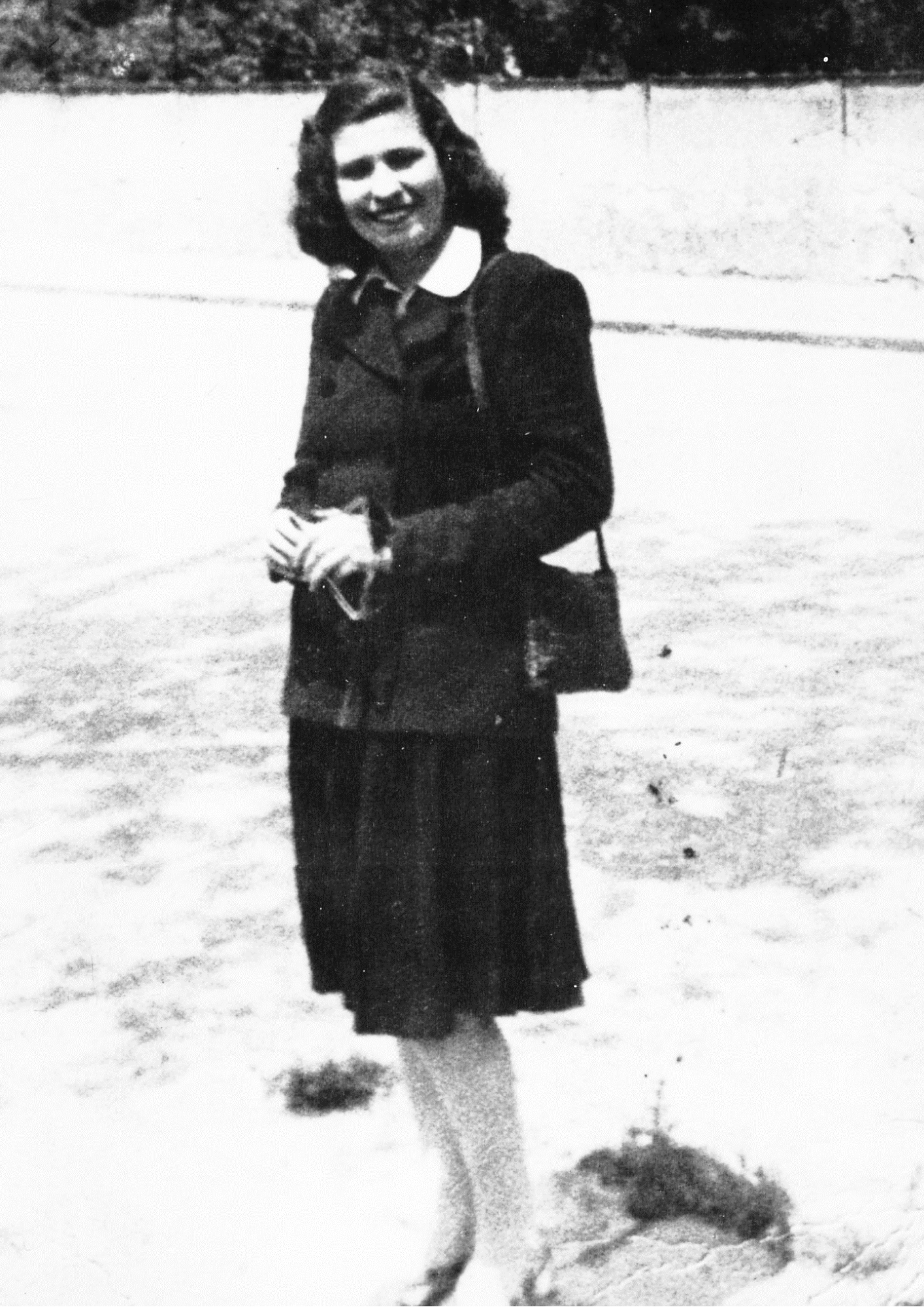
- Born: Tosca Bucarelli; 4 October 1922; Florence, Tuscany, Kingdom of Italy
- Died: 10 January 2000 (aged 77); Florence, Tuscany, Italian Republic
- Political party: Gruppi di Azione Patriottica; Italian Communist Party
- Spouse: Roberto Martini
- Children: 2
- Awards: Silver Medal of Military Valor

Tosca Bucarelli Martini (Italian pronunciation: [ˈtoska bukaˈrɛlli marˈtiːni, ˈtɔs-]; 4 October 1922 – 10 January 2000) was an Italian Partisan and politician from Florence. During the Italian Civil War, she joined the Gruppi di Azione Patriottica (GAP), a Communist Partisan organization resisting Mussolini's Fascist Italian Social Republic. She later served as City Councillor for Florence from 1975 to 1980.

== Partisan activity ==
On 8 February 1944, Bucarelli and her GAP comrade, Antonio Ignesti, attempted to bomb the Bar Paskowski, frequented by Fascist Party members and Nazi soldiers. However, the fuse malfunctioned, and their cover was blown. Ingesti managed to escape, but Bucarelli was captured and subjected to torture by Mario Carità's forces. She was later taken to the Villa Triste, and later to the Santa Verdiana monastery, where other anti-fascists were being held.

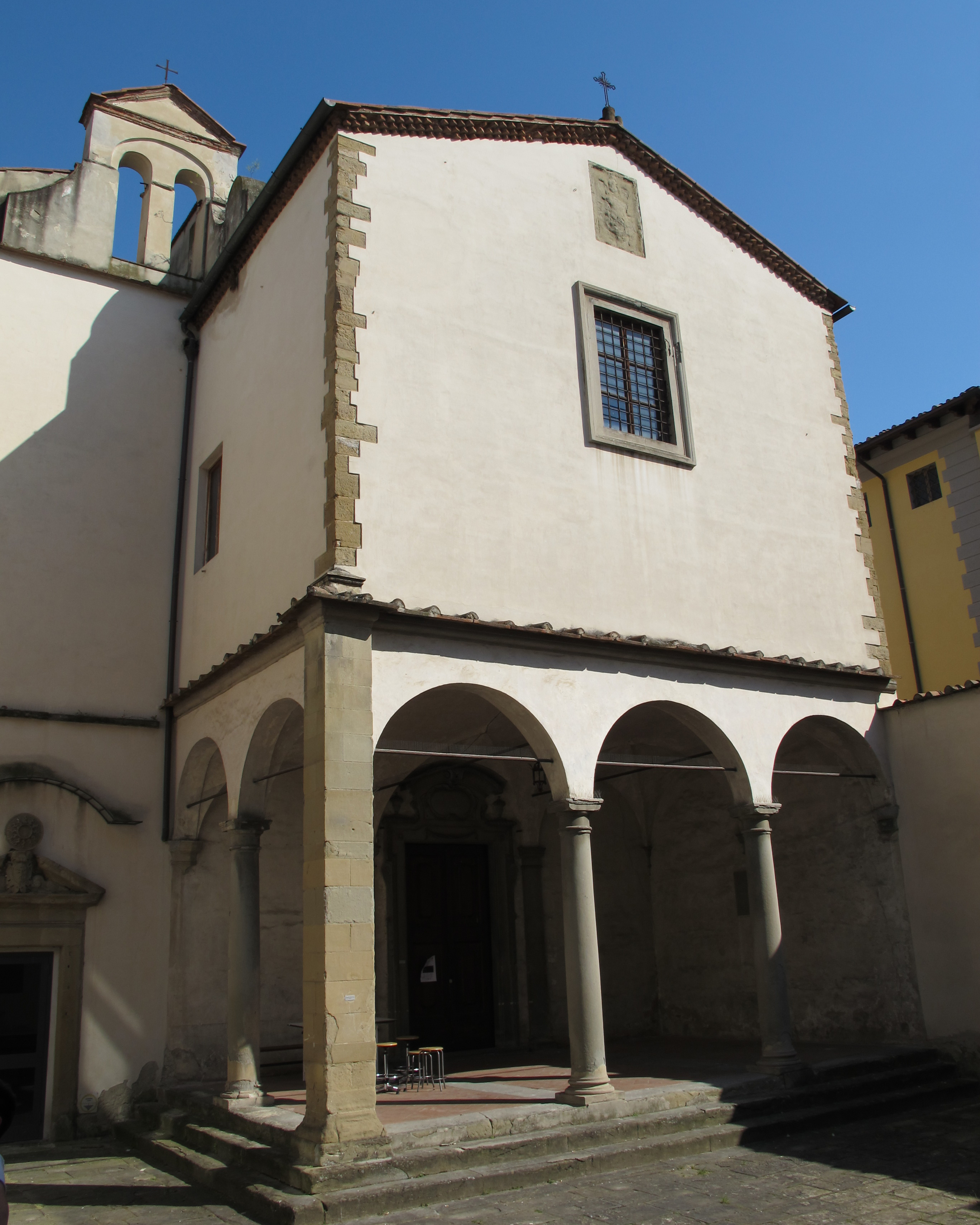
Santa Veridana monastery, where Bucarelli was held prisoner.

On 9 July 1944, she was rescued alongside 16 others from Santa Verdiana by a GAP team led by Bruno Fanciullacci and Elio Chianesi. During her captivity and as a result of Carità's infamous torture methods, she suffered liver damage, which would impact her health for the rest of her life. In fact, both Fanciullacci and Chianesi would be captured and tortured by Carità at Villa Triste less than a week later, with Chianesi dying under torture and Fanciullacci dying during an escape attempt.

== Post-war ==
On 16 October 1944, Bucarelli married fellow Partisan Roberto Martini. She had two children with him: Mario in 1953 and Margherita in 1955. After the war, Roberto Martini became mayor of the small Tuscan town of Scandicci from April 1947 until June 1951. She appeared in Liliana Cavani's 1965 film Women of the Resistance (Italian: La donna nella Resistenza). Bucarelli herself served as City Councillor of the city of Florence from 1975 to 1980 as a member of the Italian Communist Party. She donated her husband's papers to the city archive in 1995.

Upon her death in 2000, the Council Hall of District 4 at Villa Vogel was named in her honour.
