= Cimitero di Soffiano =

Cemetery in Florence, Italy

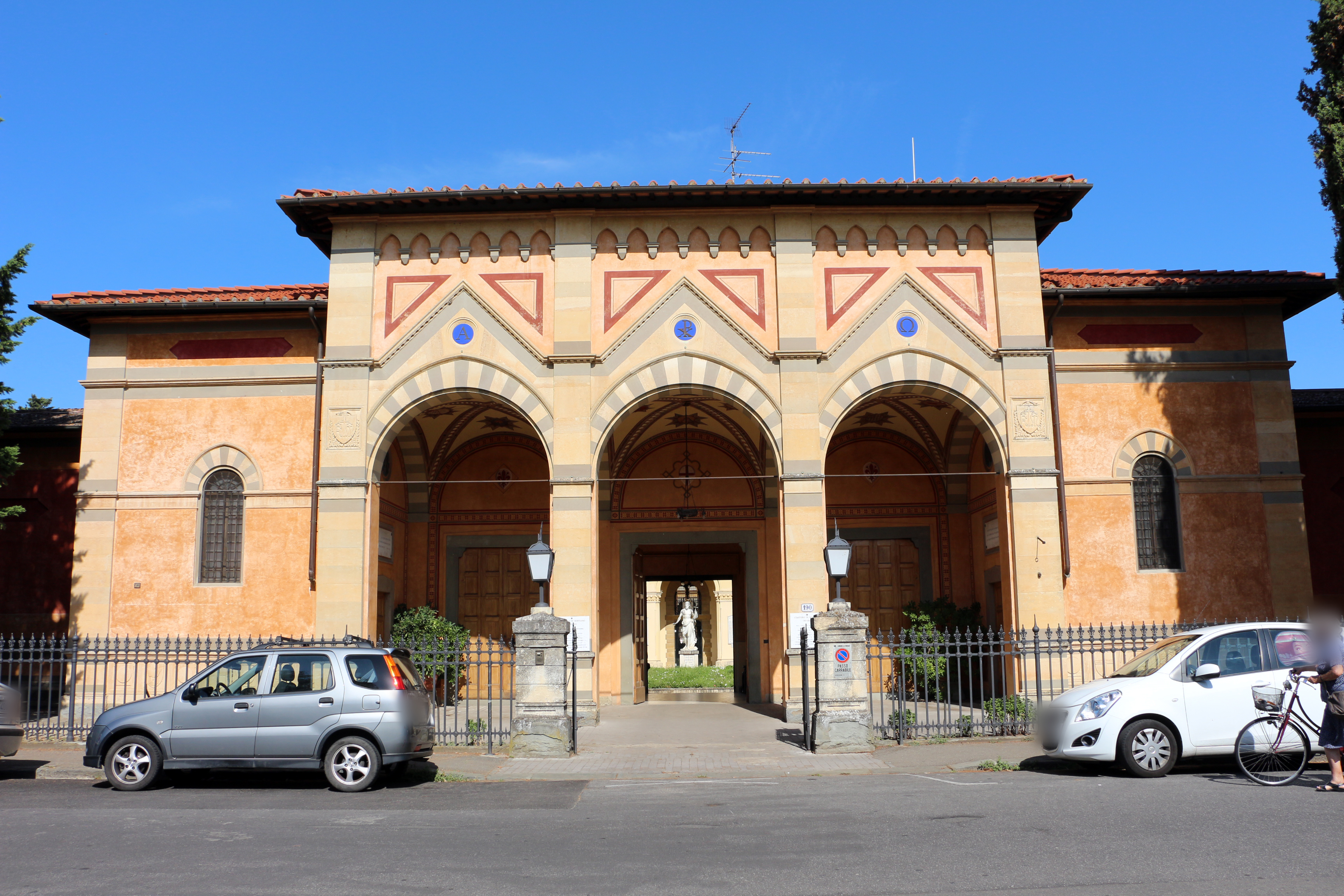

Details
- Established: 1896
- Country: Italy
- Coordinates: 43.7634°N 11.2180°E
- Type: Civil

Cimitero di Soffiano (The Soffiano cemetery) is a cemetery located in Florence. The main entrance is located at the corner between Soffiano and Guardavalle.

== History ==
By decree of 1894 the Venerabile Arciconfraternita della Misericordia di Firenze decided to construct a new cemetery (after that of the Pinti) in the area of Soffiano, at a point imposed by the City of Florence because it was hidden from the town of Florence from the Colle di Bellosguardo and distant of about two miles from San Frediano gate.

Work began in 1896, the design having been done by architect Michelangelo Maiorfi: Cardinal Agostino Bausa blessed the first stone on 31 May that year.

The entrance is provided with a serene and travertine stone facade, with the coats of arms of the Misericordia and Florence painted along with those of the ancient Arts of Florence; on the sides of the entrance are instead sculpted those of the city districts, the Mercy and the People's Cross. Numerous cypress trees are planted in the cemetery. As of 31 January 1997 a total of 38,527 deceased people had been buried in the cemetery.

== Notable burials ==
Among the illustrious figures buried in Soffiano can be mentioned:

- Antonio Baldissera – General of the Italian Army
- Bruno Fanciullacci – partisan
- Artemio Franchi – football administrator
- Enrico Novelli – journalist, illustrator, writer and comic author
- Gian Carlo Oli – lexicographer and politician
- Giulio Piccini – writer
- Roberto Ridolfi – historian and writer
- Giuseppina Lasagni – historian and Latinist
- Giuseppe Rigutini – linguist
- Sergio Ristori – football administrator
- Raffaello Romanelli – artist
- Romano Romanelli – artist, writer and naval officer
- Riccardo Magherini – footballer
- Adriano Salani – publisher
- Corso Salani – actor

=== Families ===
- Antinori
- Capponi
- Ginori Conti
- Pandolfini
- Pucci
- Serristori
- Strozzi
- Torrigiani
- Niccolini di Camugliano
