= Giuseppe Miggiano =

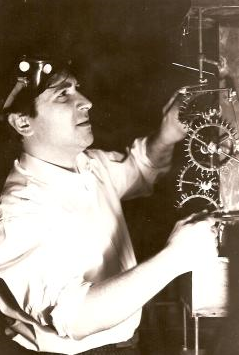
Giuseppe Miggiano Portrait

Giuseppe Miggiano (born 16 October 1938) is a Belgian painter and artist.

He was born at Tuglie, in southern Italy, and moved with his family to Charleroi in the aftermath of World War II.
