= Alcide Cervi =

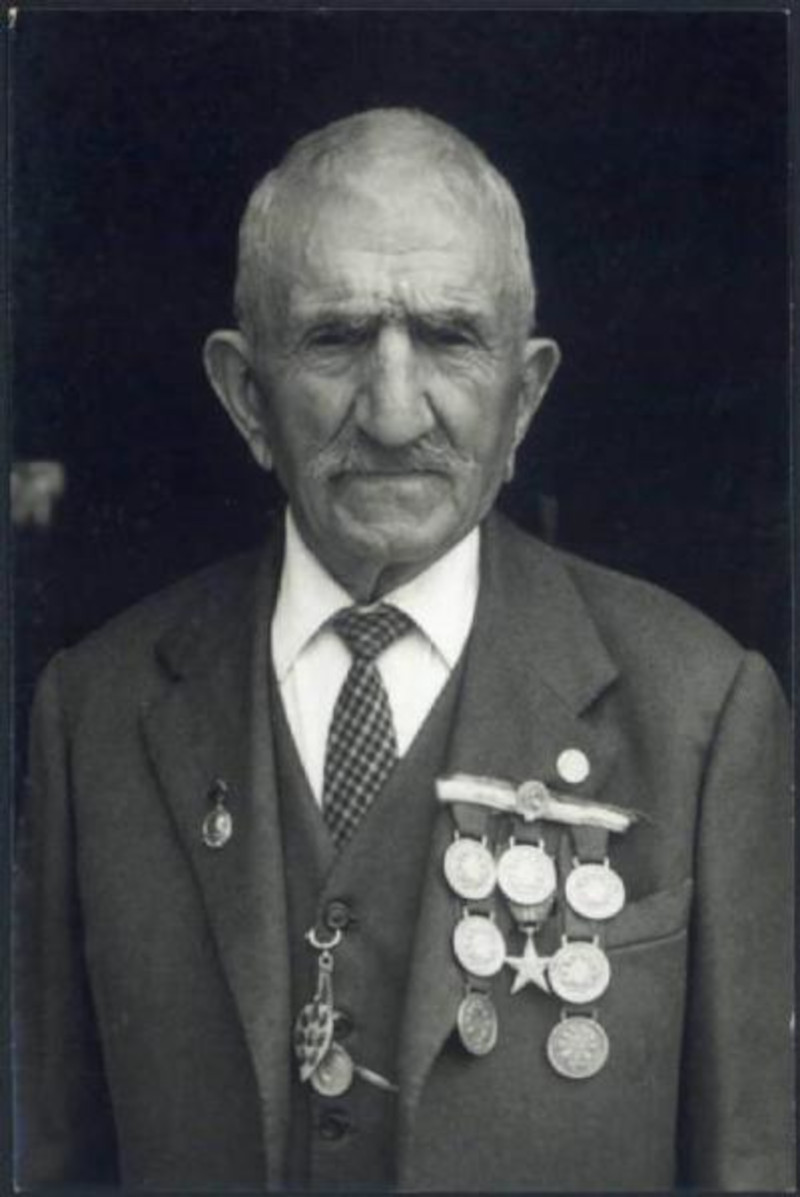
- Born: 6 May 1875; Campegine, Kingdom of Italy
- Died: 27 March 1970 (aged 94); Reggio Emilia, Italy
- Occupations: Farmer; Partisan

Alcide Cervi (6 May 1875 – 27 March 1970) is the patriarch of an Italian family noted for partisan activities that resisted the Italian fascist regime. He is the father of the Cervi Brothers, who were executed during the struggle against Fascism.

== Biography ==
Cervi was born in Campegine, Province of Reggio Emilia, Emilia-Romagna, Italy. He was one of the three sons of Agostino and Virginia Cervi, a family of Emilian mezzadri. He married Genoeffa Cocconi (1876 – 14 November 1944) in 1899. The couple had ten children, including one stillborn girl, between 1901 and 1921. Seven of these were males and they later accompanied Cervi in his activism against Fascism.

=== Activism ===
Cervi worked as a peasant but became a political activist during the Italian fascist regimes. An account cited a tradition of activism in the Cervi family, which had a history of farming that intersected with political struggle. In 1896, for instance, Alcide's father Agostino led a peasant insurgency after the government imposed tax on flour.

Cervi first joined the Italian People's Party (Partito Popolare Italiano; PPI), a political group founded by the Sicilian priest Luigi Sturzo. Cervi participated in political movements that focused on reform and the modernization of agriculture. Cervi became an active member of the Italian Popular Party, one of the three biggest political parties in Italy that was eventually known for opposing Fascism. This party, the predecessor of the Christian Democrats, favored social legislation and agrarian reforms. Later, Cervi drifted towards the Italian Socialist Party (Partito Socialista Italiano; PSI), which was the offshoot of the merger of different Marxist-socialist parties in Italy.

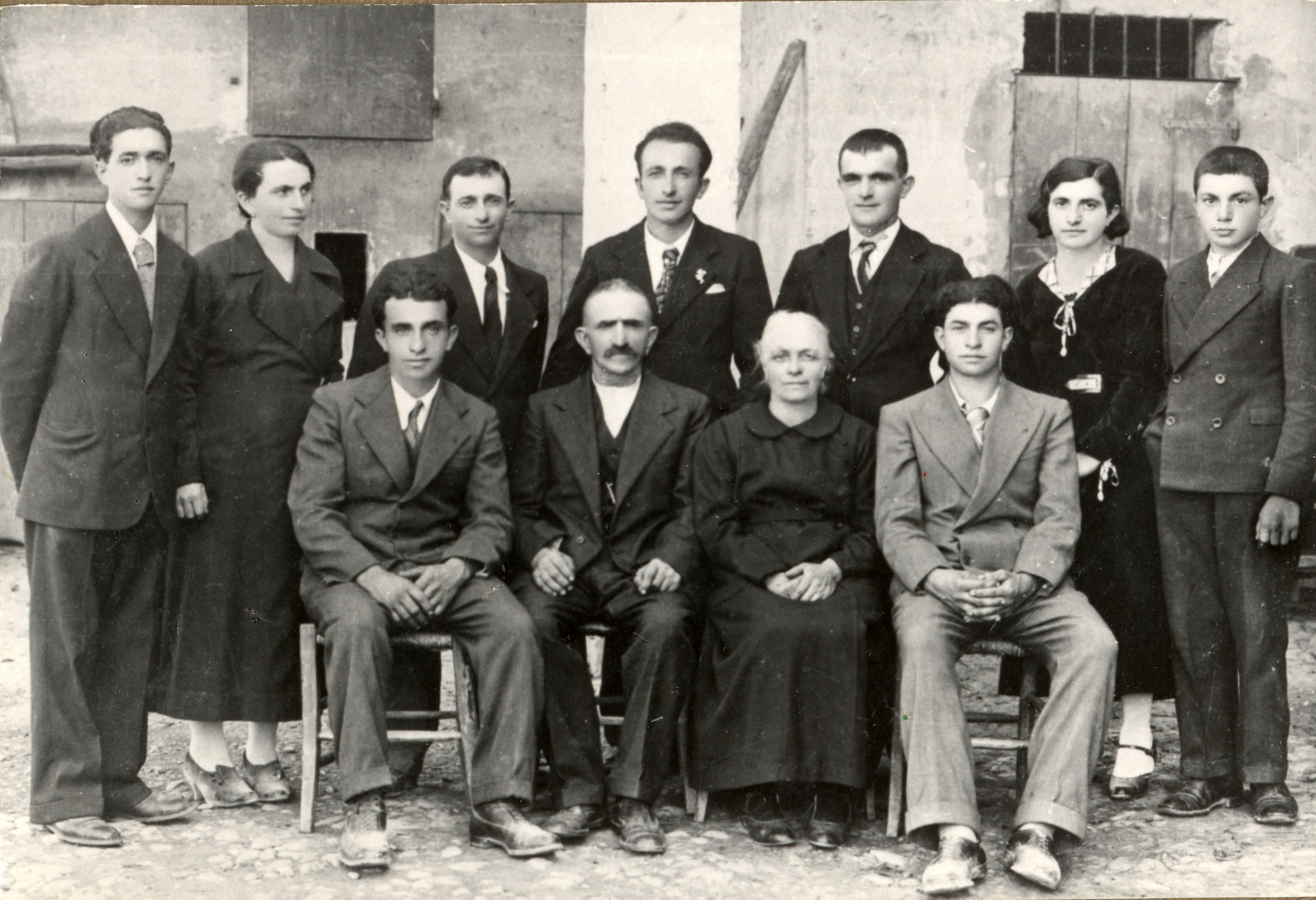
Alcide Cervi and his family.

The Cervi family initially attracted the attention of authorities sometime in the mid-1930s after they opened a library that included books considered to be seditious. During this time, members of Cervi's family were arrested but none were incarcerated. Cervi and his sons were also present during demonstrations that called for the release of political prisoners on 26 July 1943. He was also credited for organizing the escape of allied prisoners from the Fossoli camp and he hid the escapees in his farm. Cervi managed these activities with the help of the Sarzi family, which managed a traveling theater company.

=== Awards and recognition ===
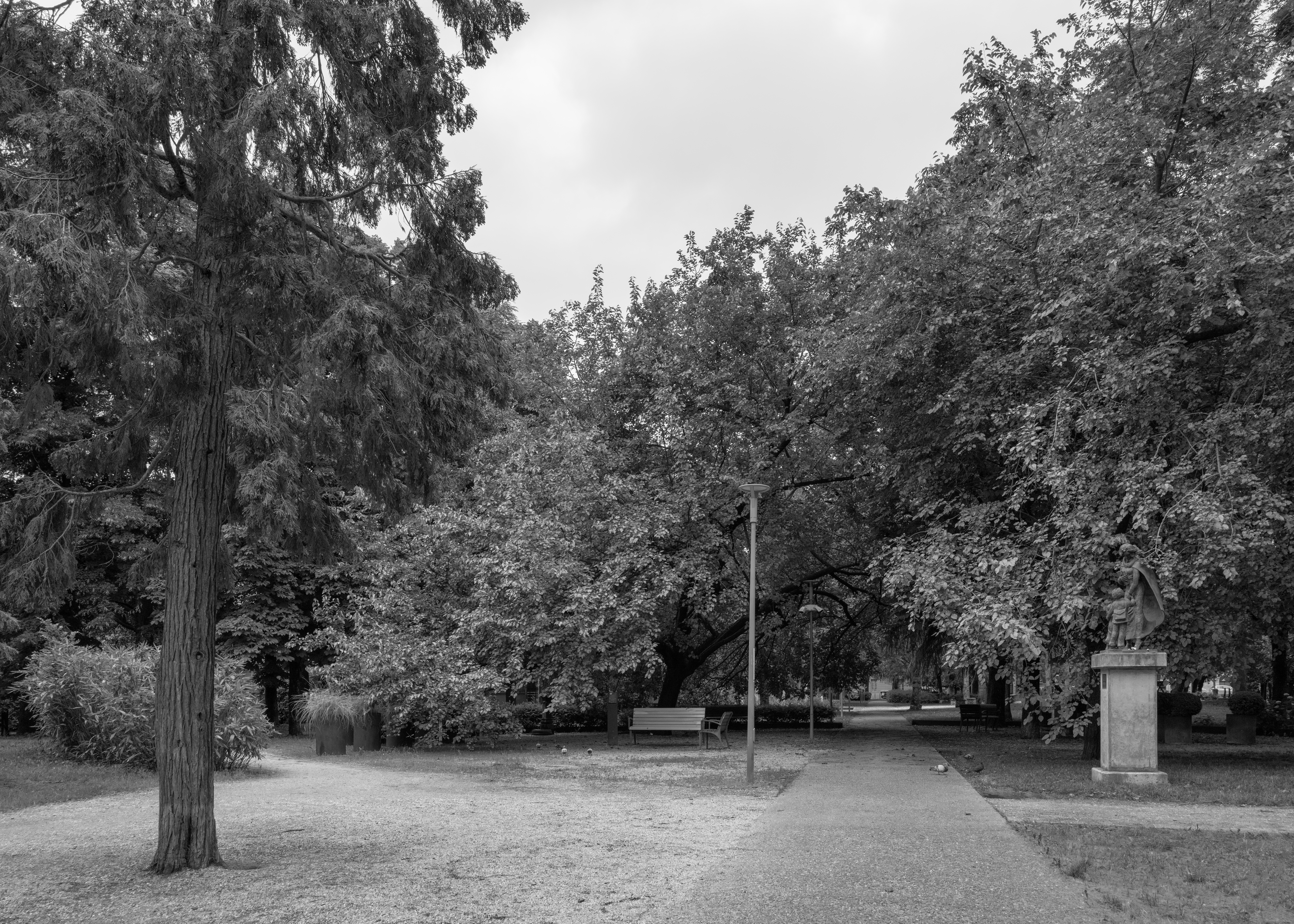
The Parco Alcide Cervi at Reggio Emilia, Italy was named in Cervi's honor.

On 17 January 1954, Cervi was awarded by Luigi Einaudi the Medaglia d'oro della Resistenza (Gold Medal of the Resistance) in recognition of his contributions to the anti-Fascist movement. Previously, Cervi was also the recipient of several awards given by Einaudi's predecessor, Enrico De Nicola.

The story of the Cervi family was first told by Italo Calvino, who published a couple of articles detailing the family's history and their participation in the Resistance movement. The stories were published in Patria independente and L'Unità in 1953. Aside from their struggles as partisans, Calvino also highlighted Cervi and his family's contributions to Italian agriculture. This aspect was also highlighted in the study conducted by Ilaria Marcyan entitled, The Cervi Family: A Peasant Story. In 1955, Salvatore Quasimodo visited the family and told their story in a short poem, Ai fratelli Cervi.

In the winter of 1954, Cervi was interviewed by journalist Roberto Nicolai (1924–1983), and told him the story of his sons and his family. Based on the interviews and Cervi's memories — which had been delivered in the local dialect, since Cervi (who had left school at the age of seven, more than six decades before) practically did not spoke Italian —, Nicolai wrote a biographical book, I miei sette figli, which was a commercial and critical success, selling half a million copies by October 1955 (also thanks to the copies bought and distributed by the Italian Communist Party), and being translated into a dozen languages — including Russian, French, Japanese, and Chinese. The book was also praised for its straightforward language, which mixed spoken, informal Italian and actual dialect, and was nominated for the Viareggio Prize.

Cervi died on 27 March 1970, at Reggio Emilia.

== Publications ==
- Cervi, A. (1955). Nicolai, R. (ed.). I miei sette figli. Rome: Editori Riuniti.
