= Villaverla =

- Comune
- Comune di Villaverla
- Location within Italy Location within Veneto
- Coordinates: 45°39′N 11°30′E
- Country: Italy
- Region: Veneto
- Province: Vicenza (VI)
- Frazioni: Novoledo

Government
  - Mayor: Enrico De Peron

Area
  - Total: 15 km^{2} (5.8 sq mi)
- Elevation: 75 m (246 ft)

Population (31 December 2015)
  - Total: 6,127
  - Density: 410/km^{2} (1,100/sq mi)
- Demonym: Villaverlesi
- Time zone: UTC+1 (CET)
  - Summer (DST): UTC+2 (CEST)
- Postal code: 36030
- Dialing code: 0445
- ISTAT code: 024118
- Patron saint: St. Dominic
- Saint day: 8 August
- Website: Official website

Villaverla is a town in the province of Vicenza, Veneto, Italy. It is west of SP349 and south of A31.

== Origins ==
From Roman times, the original name of the nearby village that eventually became Villaverla was "Roveredum." The center of that first village was likely located in the area where April 25 Road and Roare Road intersect, suggested by archaeological finds at an old brickyard nearby (Roman coins and traces of arched brick walls of Roman origin.)

Around 1004 AD, Giovanni Verla (Giovanni of Werla) and perhaps other of his family members, came from the area of Werlaburgdorf Germany with Holy Roman Emperor Henry II in a military campaign to put down a revolt by Arduin, Marquis of Ivrea. Giovanni and his relatives (originally referred to as the Werlas, later as Verlas or Verlatti, and today Verlato) were subsequently granted land by the Emperor in the towns of Thiene, Zane and what was then Roveredum.

The name "Villaverla" literally means "Village of the Verla." This was a reflection of both the influence that the Verlato family had at the time and the manner in which the family was referred to (i.e. Verla or Verlatti) during the time the modern town's name was being adopted. The name Villaverla began to be adopted around the end of the 13th century and was well established by around 1663 when Pagliarino wrote his history of the area.

The Villa Verlato, a palazzo, was built in Villaverla for the Verlato family around 1574, and was designed by renowned architect Vicenzo Scamozzi. This most likely influenced both the future physical development of the town as well as the adoption of the name Villaverla in the place of Roveredum. Today, the Villa Verlato is located in the center of the town, at 9 Piazza del Popolo.

== Twin towns ==
Villaverla is twinned with:

- Tuglie, Italy, since 2006

== People ==
- Elia Dalla Costa, cardinal

== Website ==
https://www.comune.villaverla.vi.it/web/villaverla/

== Sources ==
- (Google Maps)
