= Cervi Brothers =

Italian anti-fascist family

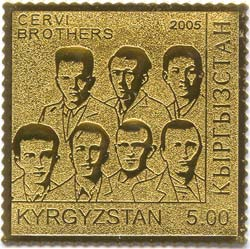
- Stamp of Kyrgyzstan with the seven Cervi Brothers
- Cause of death: Murder
- Awards

The Cervi Brothers (Italian: Fratelli Cervi) were the seven sons of Alcide Cervi (1875–1970) and Genoeffa Cocconi (1876–1944), born in Campegine, Emilia-Romagna. The brothers and their father became renowned for their activities in the organized resistance to Italian fascism.

After the Italian Social Republic was founded by Benito Mussolini in the north of Italy, the brothers were among many members of the Italian resistance movement that suffered a crackdown by the fascist authorities. In November 1943, their house was surrounded by military forces and they surrendered after running out of ammunition during the ensuing firefight. They were taken to prison in the nearby city of Reggio Emilia along with their father. In December, a fascist secretary was killed by a lone gunman in Bagnolo in Piano. In retaliation, all seven Cervi brothers, along with Quarto Camurri, were taken to the shooting range in Reggio Emilia and shot.

Alcide Cervi, who was suffering from bad health, was able to escape sometime later after the Allies bombed the prison. Their story was told, among others, by him. He survived the end of World War II and died in 1970.

The seven brothers were named Gelindo (b. 1901); Antenore (b. 1906); Aldo (b. 1909); Ferdinando (b. 1911); Agostino (b. 1916); Ovidio (b. 1918); and Ettore (b. 1921). They had two sisters, Diomira and Rina. Aldo Cervi is survived by a son, Adelmo, who was seven months old when his father was executed.

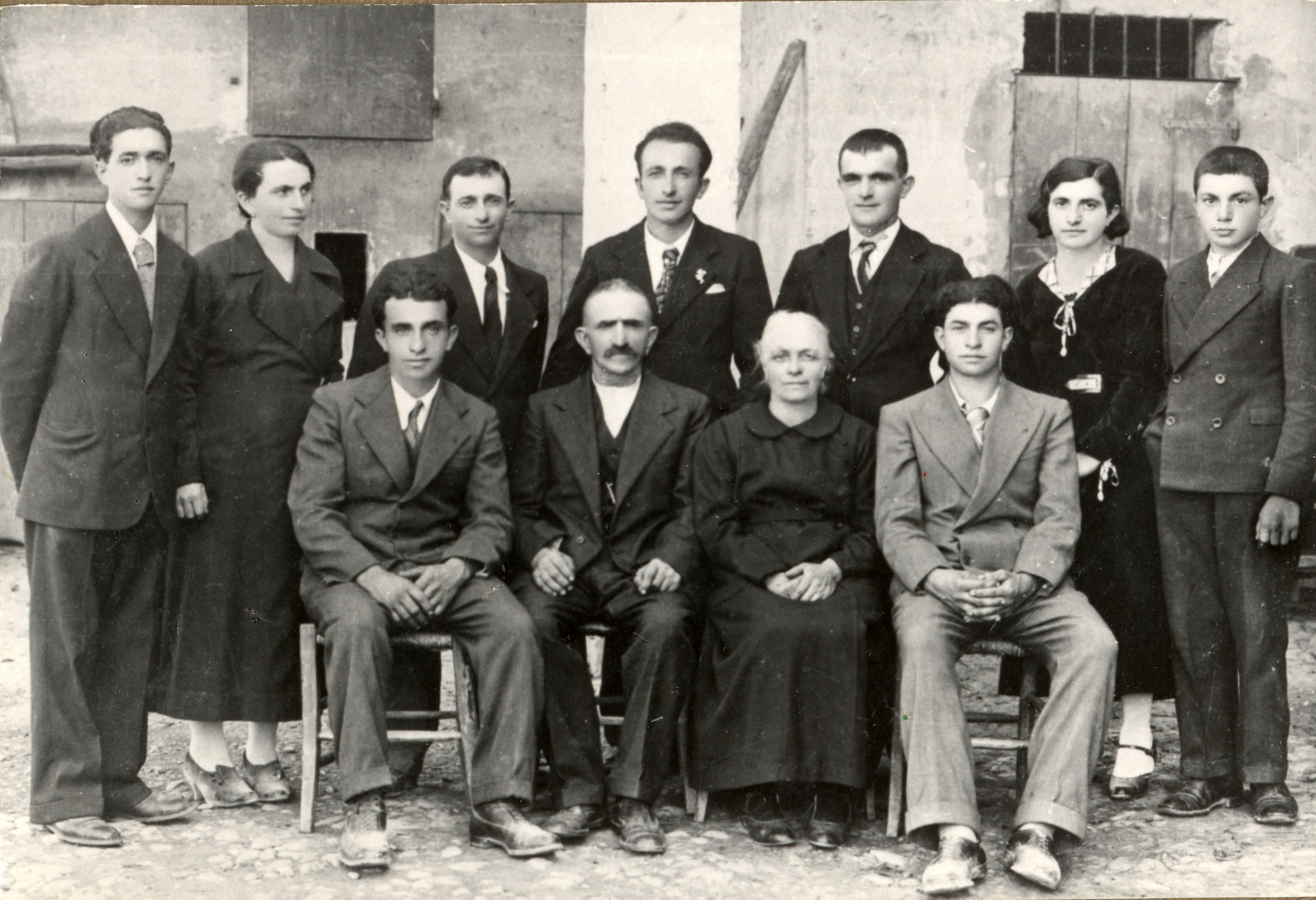
The Cervi family

== Tributes ==
For their actions of resistance, the brothers were posthumously awarded the Silver Medal of Military Valor, and their surname, Cervi, can be found in street names around Italy. A school in Collegno, near Turin, is named in their honour.

Multiple songs have been written in tribute to the brothers:

- Compagni Fratelli Cervi (anonymous)
- Sette fratelli (Mercanti di Liquore and Marco Paolini)
- La pianura dei sette fratelli (Gang, also by Modena City Ramblers in Appunti partigiani)
- Campi Rossi (Casa del Vento)
- Papà Cervi raggiunge i sette figli (Eugenio Bargagli)

There is also the 1968 film The Seven Cervi Brothers (I sette fratelli Cervi), directed by Gianni Puccini.

== See also ==
- Pastasciutta antifascista
