= Silver Medal of Military Valor =

Italian medal for gallantry

Silver Medal of Military Valor Medaglia d'argento al valor militare
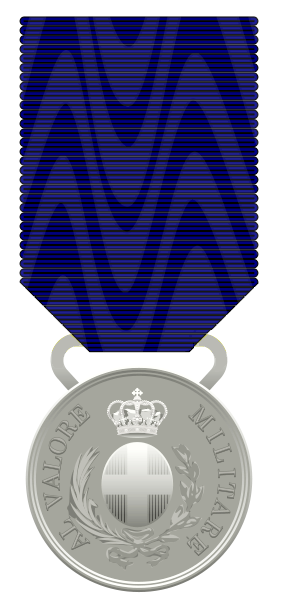
- Silver Medal of Military Valor (Royal version & Republican version)
- Type: Military decoration
- Awarded for: Deeds of outstanding gallantry in war
- Country: Italy
- Eligibility: Junior officers and soldiers
- Established: 21 May 1793
- Ribbon bar of the medal

Precedence
- Next (higher): Cross of Honour for Victims of Acts of Terrorism
- Next (lower): Silver Medal for Army Valor

The Silver Medal of Military Valor (Italian: Medaglia d'argento al valor militare) is an Italian medal for gallantry.

Italian medals for valor were first instituted by Victor Amadeus III of Sardinia on 21 May 1793, with a gold medal, and, below it, a silver medal. These were intended for junior officers or common soldiers who had distinguished themselves in combat.

These medals fell into disuse during the period of Napoleonic domination. They were reinstated on 1 April 1815, by Victor Emmanuel I of Sardinia, who, however, abolished them only a few months later, on 4 August 1815, replacing them with the Military Order of Savoy (l'Ordine militare di Savoia), now known as the Military Order of Italy.

However, in 1833, Charles Albert of Sardinia, recognizing that the Military Order was too exclusive in that it could only be awarded to persons of high rank, re-instituted the medals for valor (gold and silver) as awards for noble acts performed by soldiers in both war and peace.

According to royal decree no. 753 of 24 May 1915, the number of times one individual could receive a medal for valor (both silver and gold) was limited to three, after which a promotion was foreseen. This limit was abolished with royal decree no. 975 of 15 June 1922.

During World War I, the medal was awarded to military personnel, units above the level of company and civilians for exceptional valor in the face of the enemy.

During World War I, the medal was given out some 38,614 times for individual acts of heroism (compared to 368 Gold Medals and 60,244 Bronze medals).

Thus, the Italian Silver Medal for Military Valor is equivalent in frequency and prestige to the British Military Cross, which was awarded some 40,253 times during World War I.

The Silver Medal for Military Valor is still awarded by the Italian state, and it, along with the Gold and Bronze medals for Military Valor as well as the "Croce di Guerra al Valor Militare" (War Cross of Military Valor - which can only be awarded in time of war) is established by the Royal Decree of 4 November 1932, in which the purpose of these medals is defined as "To distinguish and publicly honor the authors of heroic military acts, even ones performed in time of peace, provided that the exploit is closely connected with the purposes for which the Armed Forces are constituted, whatever may be the condition or quality of the author."

== Notable recipients ==
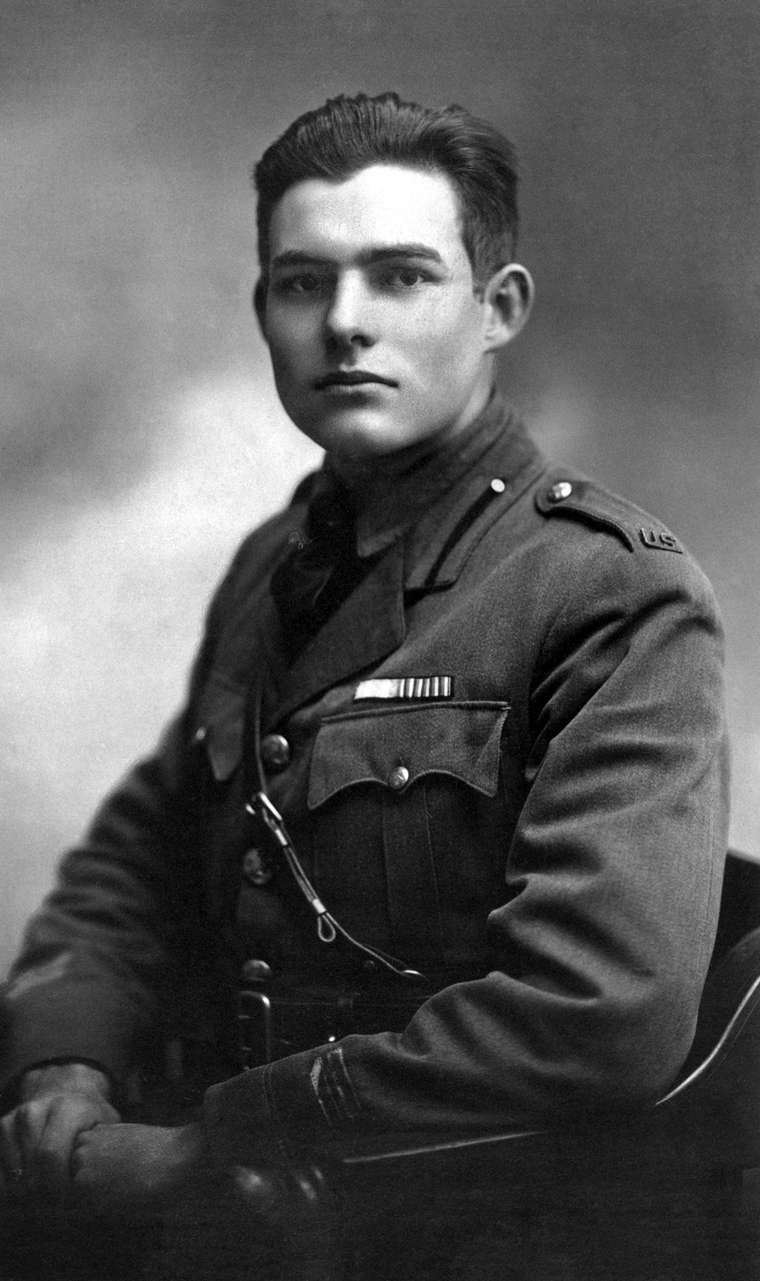
Ernest Hemingway as an Italian Front Red Cross ambulance driver

- Italo Balbo
- William George Barker VC
- Nicola Bellomo (twice)
- Alfred-Ingemar Berndt
- Aaron Bradshaw Jr.
- Carlo Emanuele Buscaglia
- Federico Cafiero
- Cervi Brothers
- Mark W. Clark
- Gino De Giorgi (twice)
- Ludovico De Filippi
- Alfred Evans
- Arturo Ferrarin
- Alfred Gause
- Joachim Helbig
- Ernest Hemingway
- Sir William Holmes
- Hans Kroh
- Alfredo Madau
- Hans-Joachim Marseille
- Mario Masciulli
- Walther Nehring
- Erwin Rommel
- Hans-Ulrich Rudel
- Hippolyte De La Rue
- Emanuele Ruspoli
- Nazario Sauro
- Achille Starace
- Johannes Streich
- Walkiria Terradura
- Attilio Teruzzi
- Marcello Serrazanetti
- Edmond Thieffry
- Cervi Brothers
- Hans von Luck
- Guido Jung
- Ada Gobetti
- Armando Diaz
- Gabriele D'Annunzio
- Alessandro Sinigaglia
- Mario Fiorentini (thrice)
- Emilio Lussu (twice)

== See also ==
- Medal of Military Valor
- Gold Medal of Military Valor
- Bronze Medal of Military Valor
- War Cross of Military Valor
- Italian medals 1860-today (Italian Wikipedia)
- List of military decorations
