= Alessandro Sinigaglia =

Italian partisan (1902–1944)

Alessandro Sinigaglia, battle name Vittorio (Fiesole, 2 January 1902 – Florence, 13 February 1944) was an Italian partisan during World War II.

== Biography ==
Sinigaglia was born in Fiesole to David Sinigaglia, a Jew from Mantua, and Cynthia White, an African American woman from Saint Louis. White had arrived in Italy as a maid in Villa la Fonte, owned by the Smith family, founders of the railways in Vermont. They worked in the same villa.

Professionally a mechanic, he served in the military as a submariner in the Navy. In 1924, he returned to Fiesole and joined the clandestine Communist Party.

In 1928, to avoid arrest, he fled to France and from there to the Soviet Union, where he attended a party school, worked as a mechanic again, and got married. He then moved to Switzerland and organized Italian communist exiles there.

Later, he participated in the Spanish Civil War aboard a Republican cruiser.

After the Spanish Republican defeat, in 1939, he sought refuge in France. He was arrested and handed over to the Italian authorities in 1941, who confined him to Ventotene.

He was released in August 1943, following the fall of Mussolini, and returned to Florence, where he organized and led one of the first GAP formations.

A few months later, he fell into an ambush set by the Special Services Unit of Major Mario Carità and was killed on Via Pandolfini in Florence.

== Legacy ==
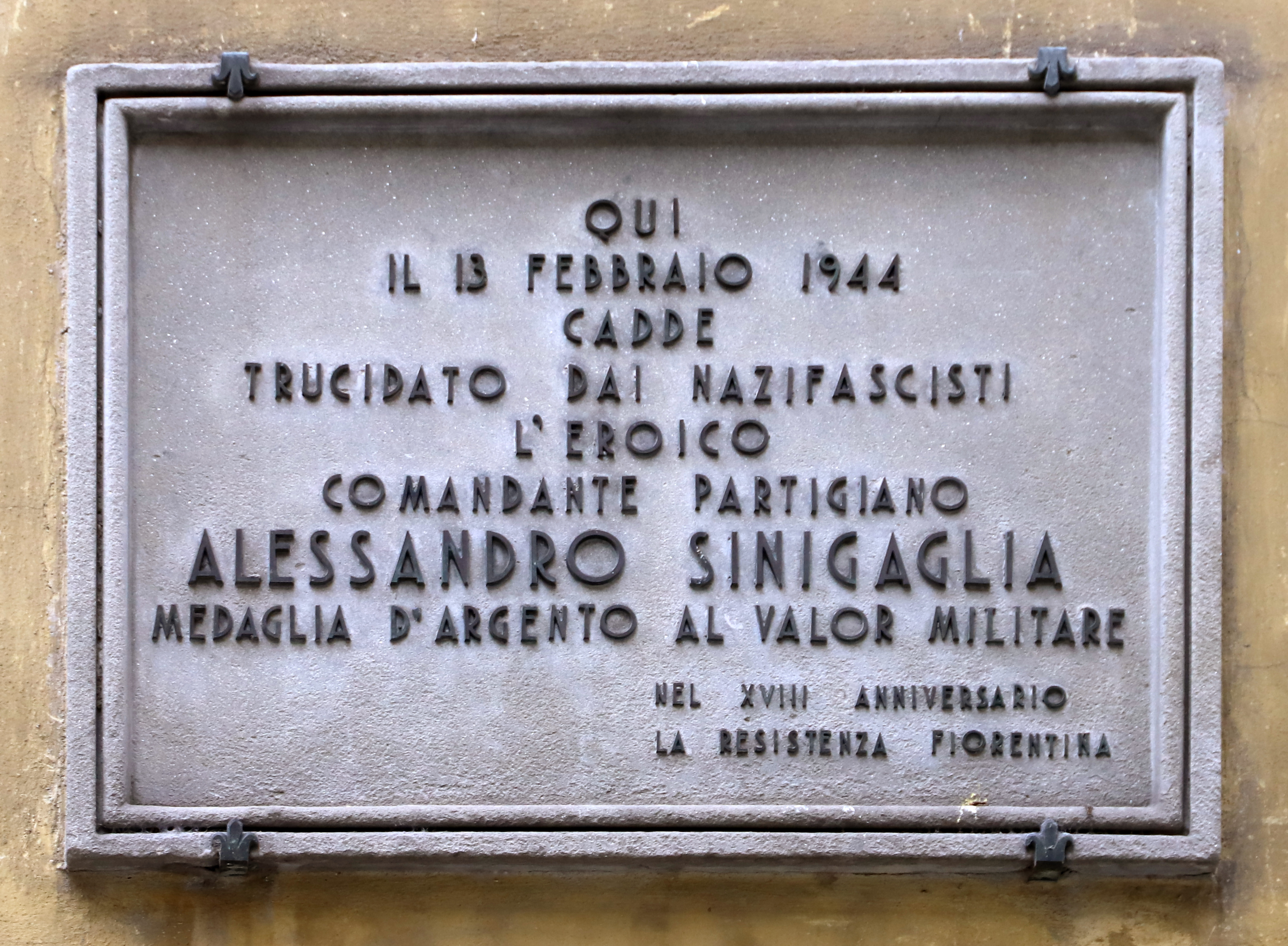

A plaque in memory of Alessandro Sinigaglia was placed at the site of his death. He is also listed among the fallen partisans of the city of Florence and in the Shrine of the Florentine Partisans in Rifredi.

In June 1944, the 22nd bis Garibaldi Brigade "Vittorio Sinigaglia" was dedicated to him.

== Honors ==

Silver Medal of Military Valor (posthumous)

== Bibliography ==
- Mauro Valeri, Negro Ebreo Comunista. Alessandro Sinigaglia, venti anni in lotta contro il fascismo. Odradek Edizioni, Roma, 2010. ISBN 978-88-96487-09-9.
- Angiolo Gracci (Commander Gracco), Brigata Sinigaglia, Ministry of Occupied Italy - State Polygraphic Institute, Rome 1945 (2nd ed.: Feltrinelli Bookstore, Florence? 1976; 3rd ed.: Political Laboratory, Naples 1995)
- Riccardo Michelucci Alessandro Sinigaglia, audiodocumentario RAI Radio3 wikiradio, January 2 2024

== See also ==
- Italian Resistance
