= Pastasciutta antifascista =

Pasta dish seasoned with butter and parmesan

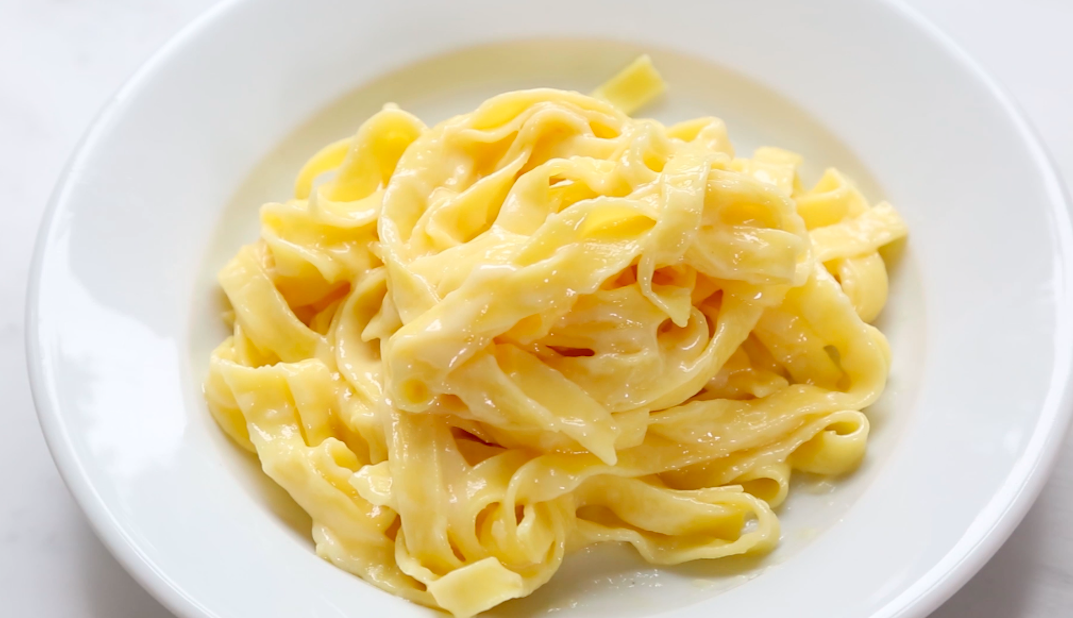
- Place of origin: Italy

Pastasciutta antifascista is a pasta dish seasoned with butter and parmesan consumed collectively in Italy to celebrate the fall of fascism in 1943.

== Origin ==
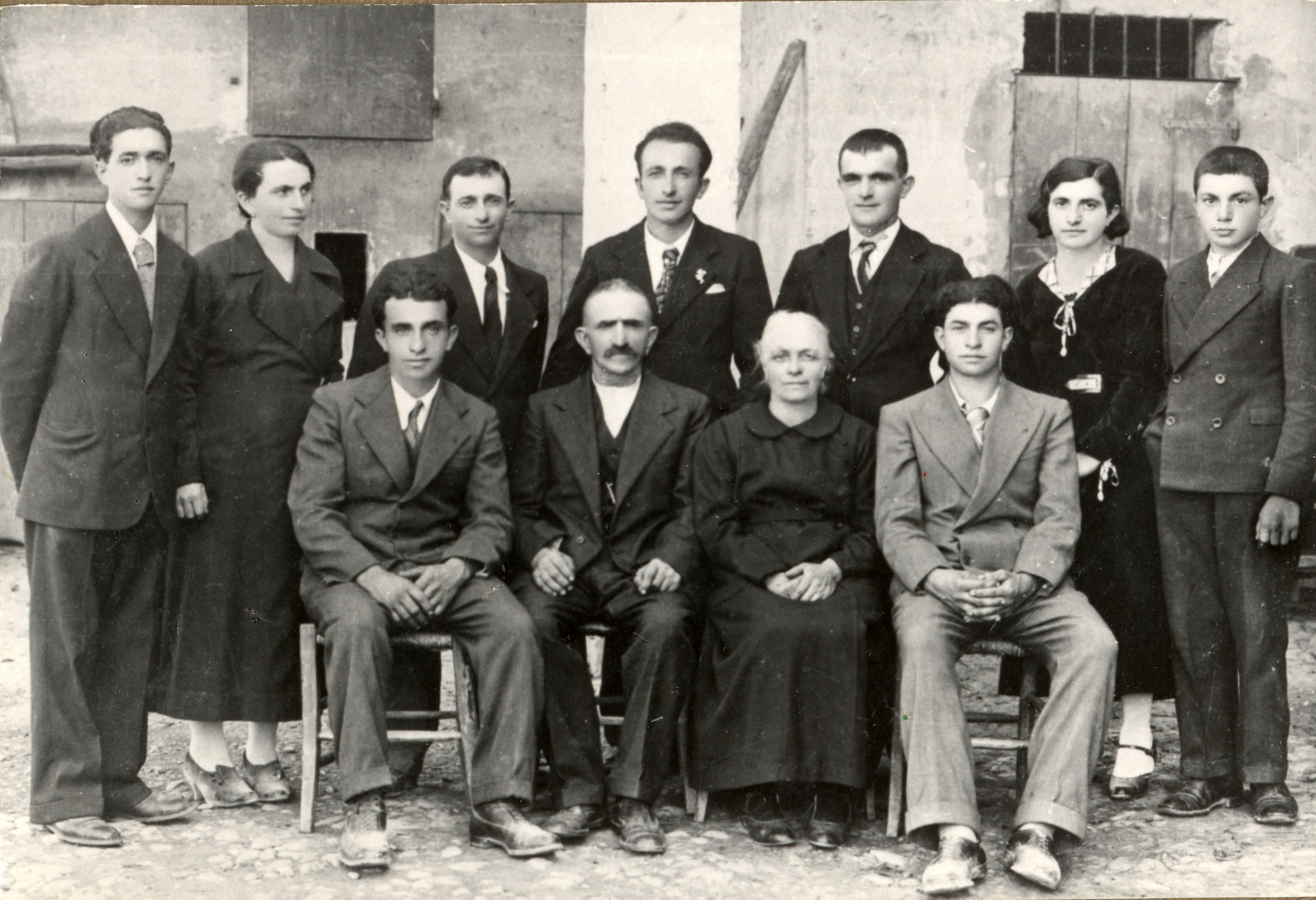
The Cervi family

Pastasciutta antifascista is a popular tradition originating in Italy during the Second World War. Its origin dates back to 25 July 1943, when Benito Mussolini was arrested and deposed. The next day, the government of Pietro Badoglio began. The news was met with joy and enthusiasm from the population, who were hopeful for the end of the dictatorship and conflict, but the German occupation, violence, civil war, and struggle for liberation continued under the Italian Social Republic. On 25 July, the Cervi Brothers, returning from work in the field, learned of Mussolini's arrest, and decided to celebrate and distributed free pasta to the people.

There is a continued tradition of sharing pastasciutta antifascista on Italy's Liberation Day. The Alcide Cervi Institute in Gattatico, Reggio Emilia, hosts a celebration every 25 July. There is a network of towns and cities in Italy who host events involving pastasciutta antifascista.

== Sources ==
- Carrara, Lorena; Salvini, Elisabetta (2015). Partigiani a tavola. Storie di cibo resistente e ricette di libertà. Fausto Lupetti Editore. ISBN 978-8868740948.
- Cervi, Alcide (2018). I miei sette figli. Einaudi Editore. ISBN 978-8806221157.
- Laura, Artioli (2020). Con gli occhi di una bambina Maria Cervi, memoria pubblica della famiglia. Viella. ISBN 978-8833132594.
- Marco, Cerri (2023). La pastasciutta dei Cervi Fame, dono e sfida antifascista in una festa del luglio 1943. Viella. ISBN 979-1254693827.
