= Tuglie =

- Comune
- Comune di Tuglie
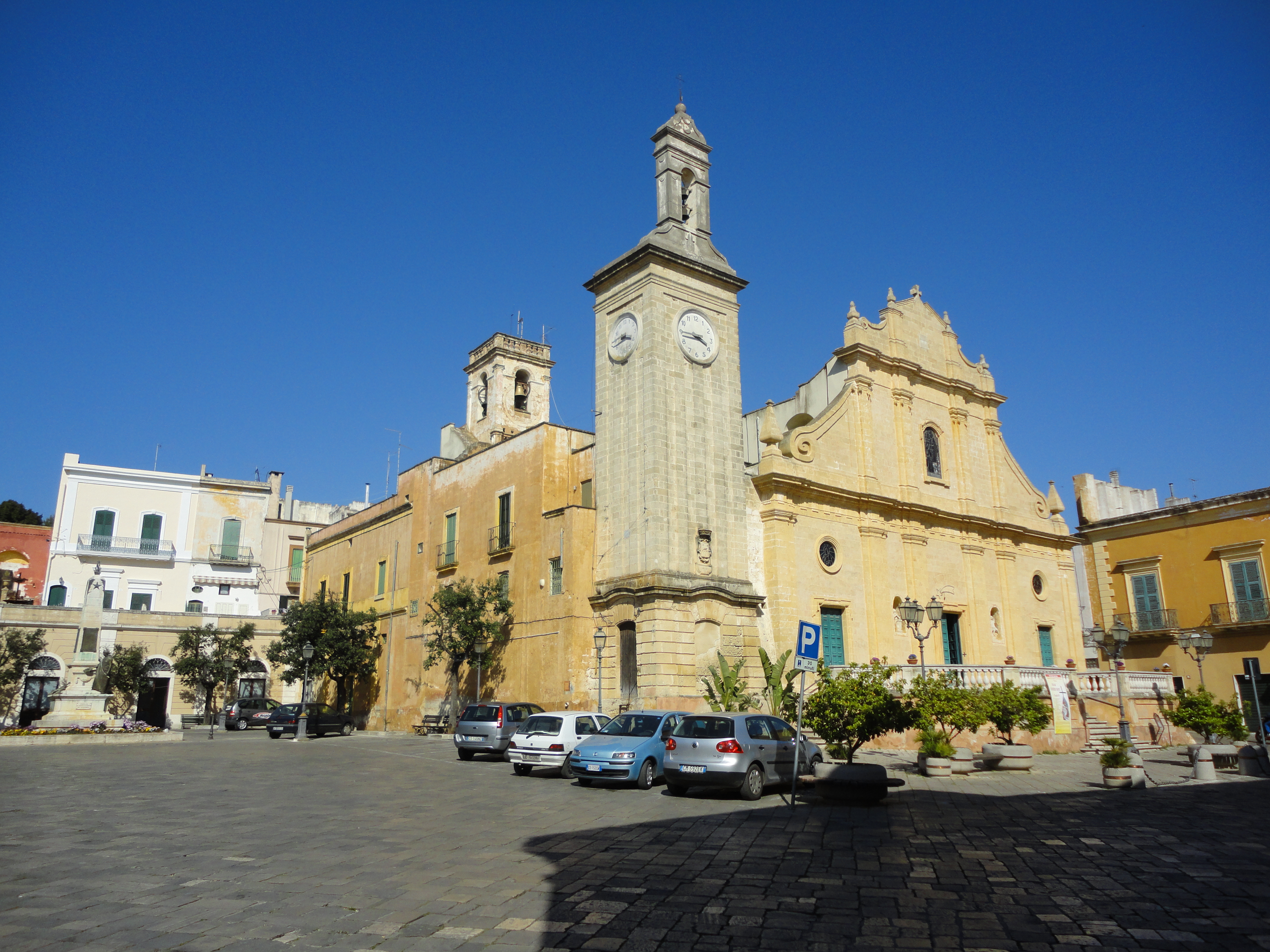

- Location within Italy Location within Apulia
- Coordinates: 40°4′N 18°6′E
- Country: Italy
- Region: Apulia
- Province: Lecce (LE)
- Frazioni: Alezio, Collepasso, Neviano, Parabita, Sannicola

Government
  - Mayor: Massimo Stamerra

Area
  - Total: 8 km^{2} (3.1 sq mi)
- Elevation: 74 m (243 ft)

Population (30 November 2011)
  - Total: 5,292
  - Density: 660/km^{2} (1,700/sq mi)
- Demonym: Tugliesi
- Time zone: UTC+1 (CET)
  - Summer (DST): UTC+2 (CEST)
- Postal code: 73058
- Dialing code: 0833
- ISTAT code: 075089
- Patron saint: Annunciation of Mary
- Saint day: 25 March
- Website: Official website

Tuglie is a town and comune in the Italian province of Lecce in the Apulia region of south-east Italy.

== People ==
- Giuseppe Miggiano, Belgian artist, was born here

== Twin towns ==
Tuglie is twinned with:

- Villaverla, Italy, since 2006
