= Buek =

Buek is a surname. Notable people with the surname include:

- Charles Buek (died 1931), American developer and architect
- Dick Buek (1929–1957), American downhill ski racer and later a daredevil stunt pilot
- Otto Buek (1873–1966), German philosopher and translator

== See also ==
- Bük
