= Piazza Tasso massacre =

Massacre by Italian Fascists at Piazza Tasso, Italy

The Piazza Tasso massacre (Italian: Eccidio in Piazza Tasso) was a massacre that occurred on July 17, 1944, at Piazza Tasso in Florence, Tuscany, Italy.

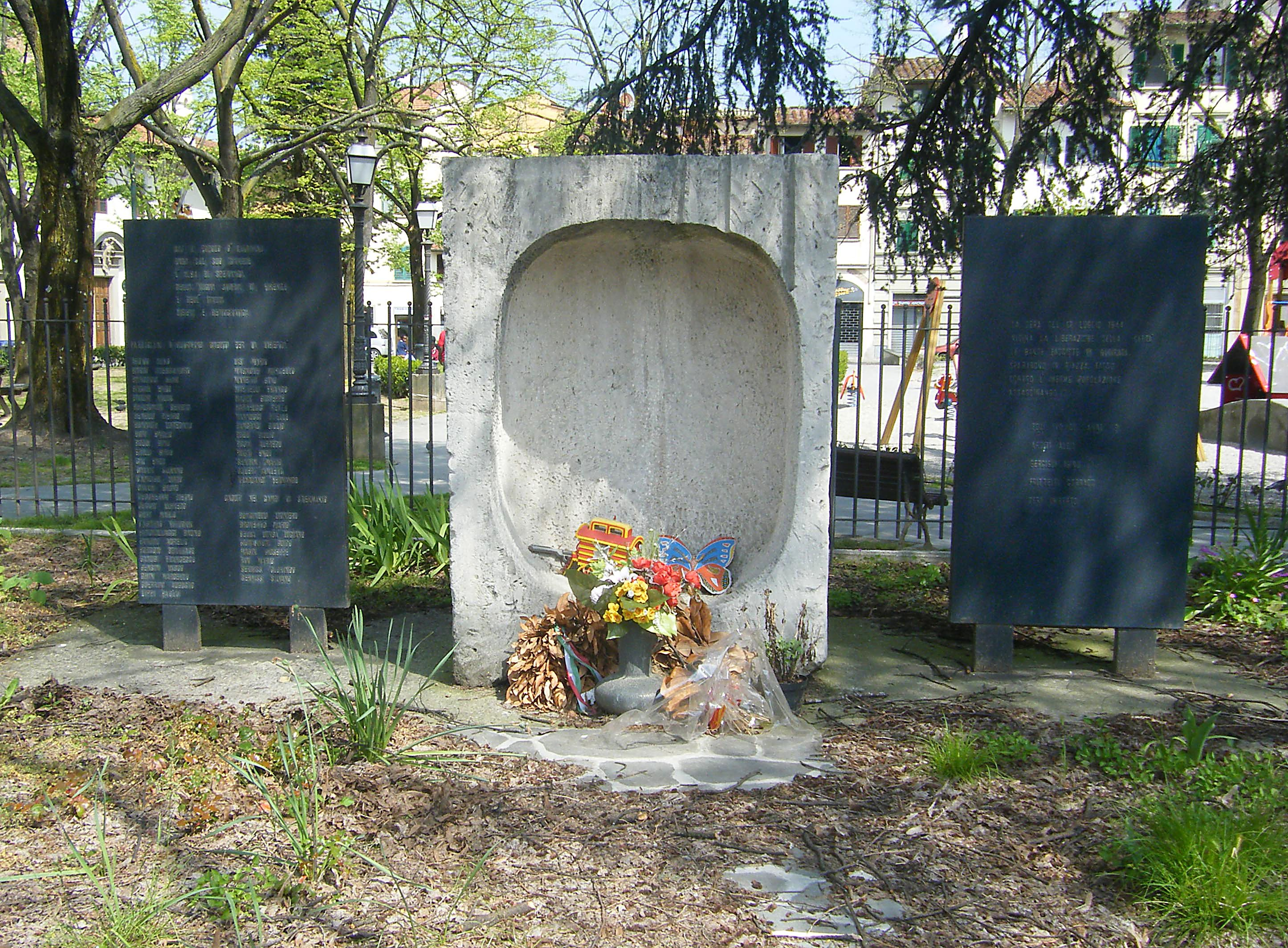
Monument in Piazza Tasso.

== History ==
On the above named date, Italian militias of the fascist Italian Social Republic allied with the German army, arrived to the Piazza Tasso and opened fire, killing five persons. The goals of the shooting are still unclear; one hypothesis is that it was to intimidate the inhabitants of the quartiere di San Frediano, which included many opponents of the regime. In the days that followed, some 17 persons suspected of being partisans were murdered at Cascine on July 23.

On a wall facing the piazza, a marble plaque was placed the year after the massacre, a translation reads:

In this square, on the eve of the Liberation day of Florence, July 17, 1944, defeated Fascism vilely assassinated five innocent citizens: Ivo Poli of 8 years, Igino Bercigli, Corrado Frittelli, Aldo Arditi, and Umberto Peri. Their memory under a climate to the democracy gives certainty of the advent of a civilization of freedom and justice for the citizens of the Oltrarno, July 17, 1945.

Decades later, a monument consisting of a block with an oval cavity has been set up in the Piazza Tasso, it is flanked by two plaques, and surrounded by fence. Toys and flowers are sometimes placed in the vacancy.
