= Agostino Bausa =

His Eminence Agostino Bausa O.P.
- Cardinal, Archbishop of Florence
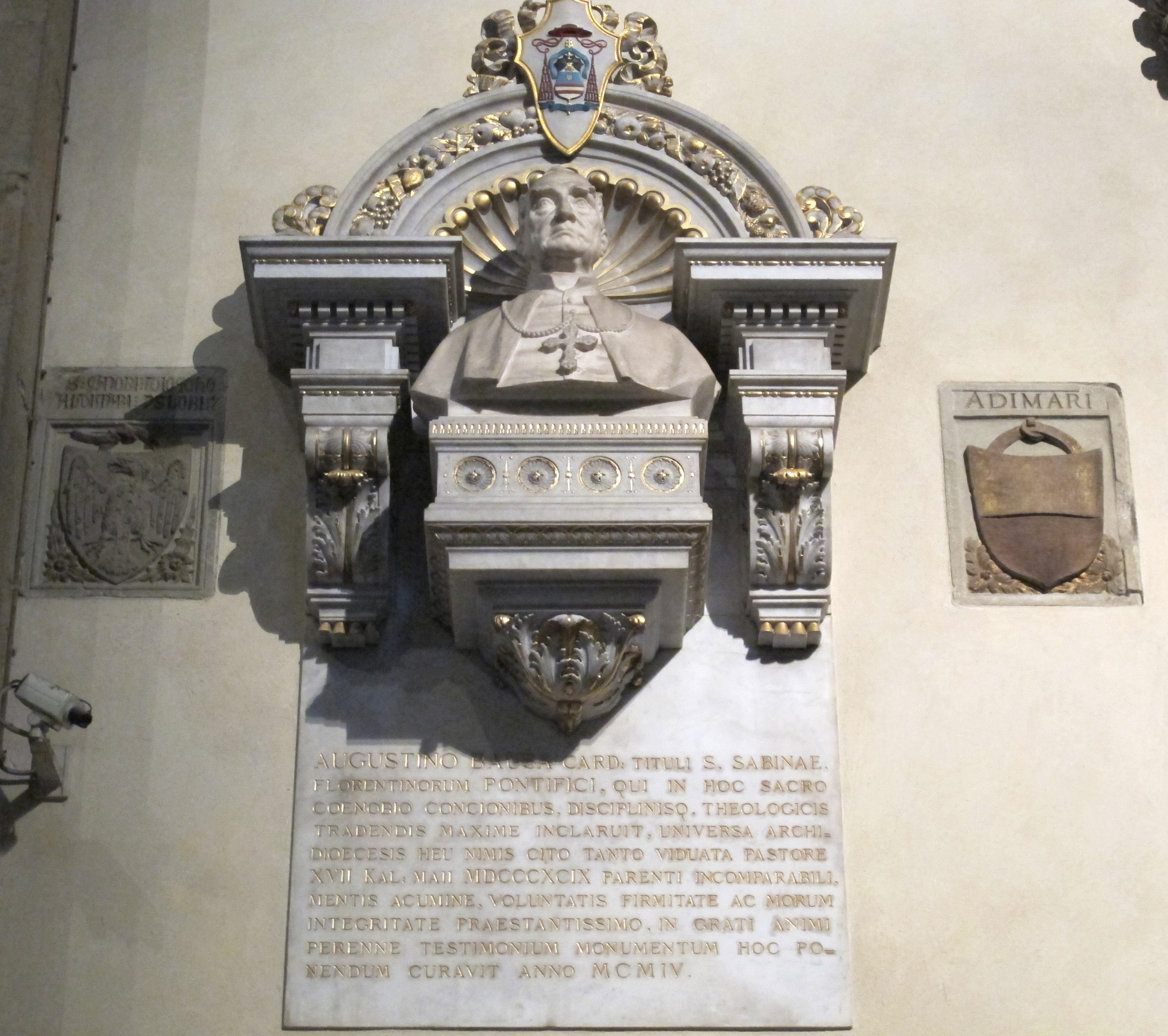
- Church: Catholic Church
- Appointed: 11 February 1889
- Installed: 25 March 1889
- Term ended: 15 April 1899
- Predecessor: Eugenio Cecconi
- Successor: Alfonso Maria Mistrangelo
- Other post: Cardinal-Priest of Santa Sabina (1889-99)
- Previous posts: Master of the Sacred Palace (1882-87); Cardinal-Deacon of Santa Maria in Domnica (1887-89)

Orders
- Ordination: 24 March 1845 by Daulo Augusto Foscolo
- Consecration: 24 March 1889 by Leo XIII
- Created cardinal: 23 May 1887 by Leo XIII
- Rank: Cardinal-Deacon (1887-89); Cardinal-Priest (1889-99)

Personal details
- Born: Antonio Vincenzo Giuseppe Bausa; 23 February 1821 Florence, Grand Duchy of Tuscany
- Died: 15 April 1899 (aged 78) Florence, Kingdom of Italy
- Parents: Giovanni Battista Bausa; Maria Annunziata Somigli
- Motto: Spes mea Dominus ("The Lord is my hope")
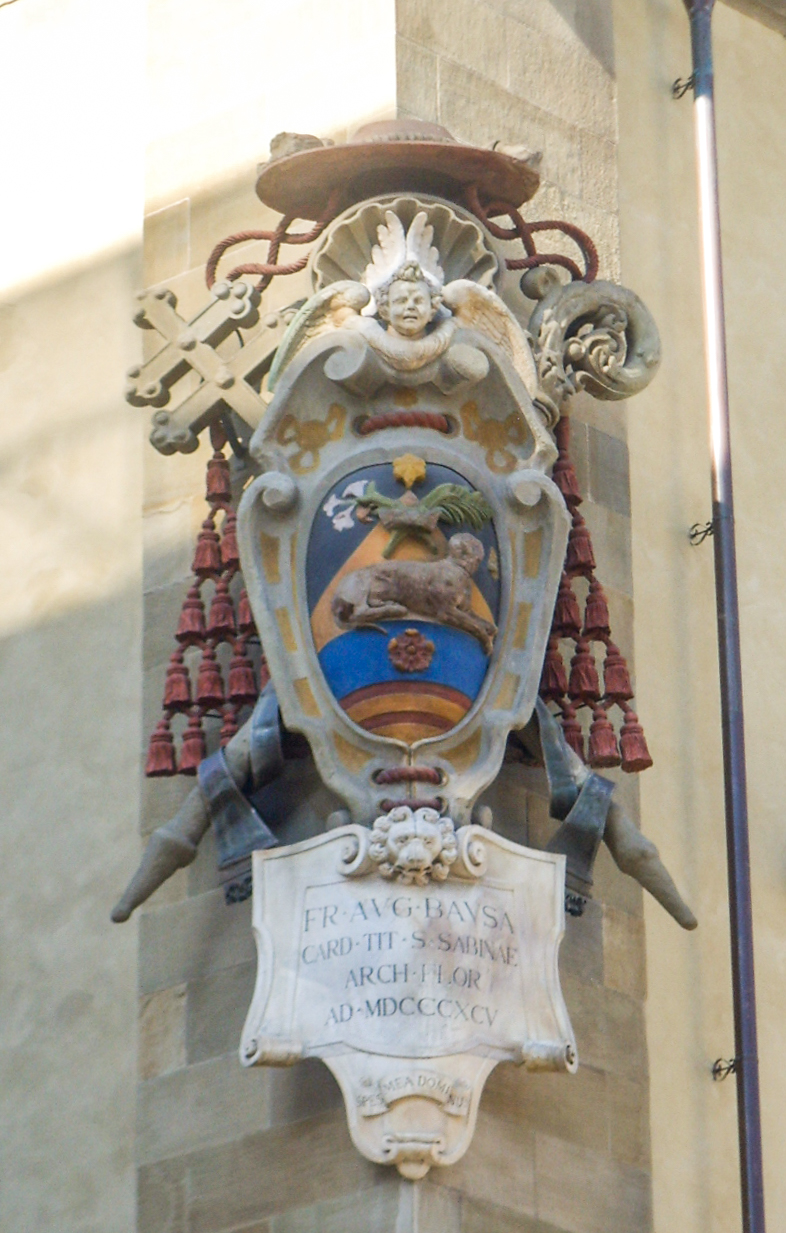
- Coat of arms

Agostino Bausa, O.P. (Italian pronunciation: [aɡoˈstiːno ˈbauza]; 23 February 1821 – 14 April 1899) – born Antonio Vincenzo Giuseppe Bausa – was an Italian cardinal of the Roman Catholic Church. A member of the Dominican Order, he served as Archbishop of Florence from 1889 to 1899.

== Biography ==
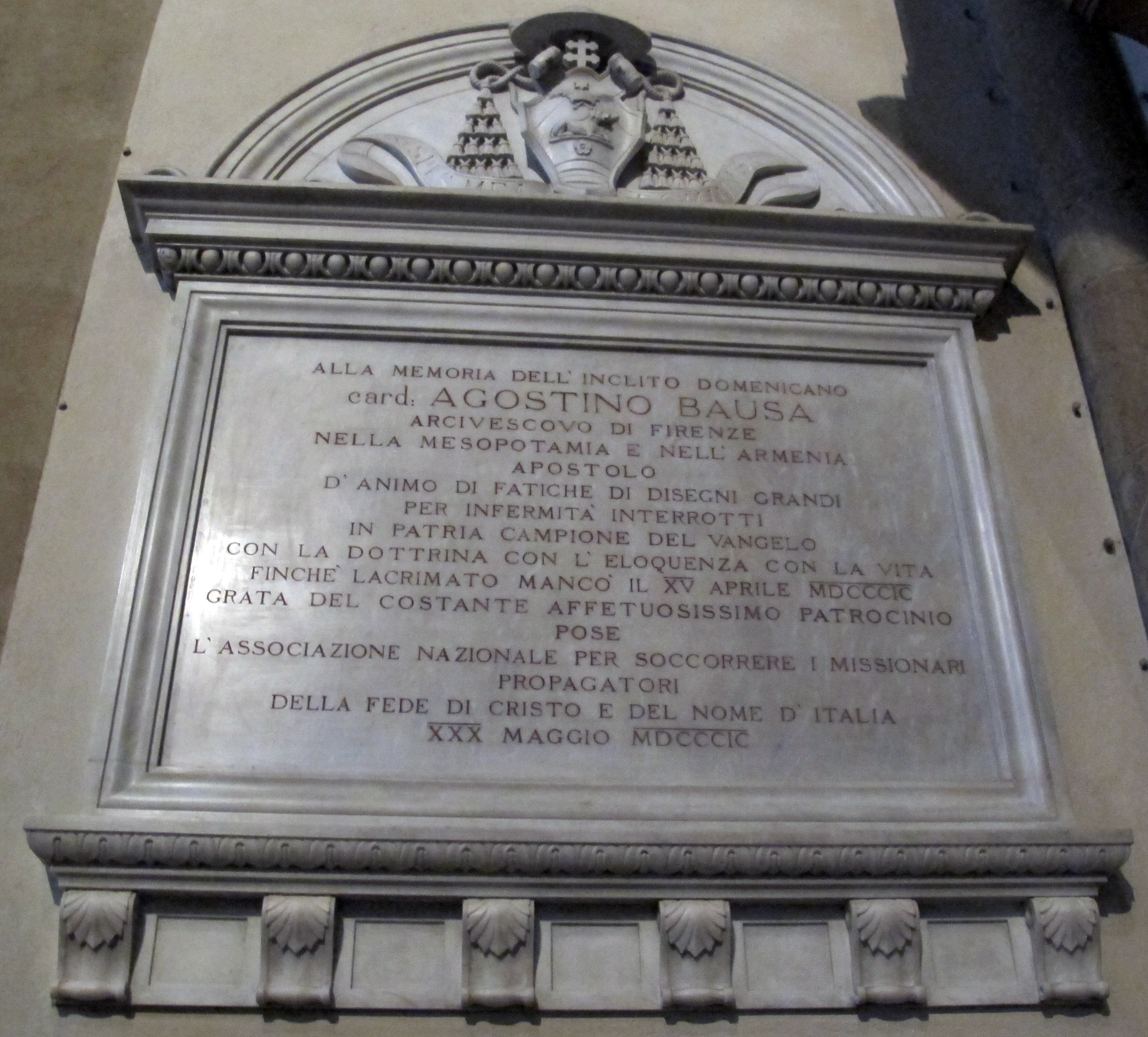

Antonio Vincenzo Giuseppe Bausa Bausa was born in Florence, Grand Duchy of Tuscany in present Italy, on 23 February 1821. He entered the Order of Preachers (taking the name of "Agostino"), better known as the Dominican Order, and was ordained on 24 March 1845 by Daulo Augusto Foscolo, Latin Patriarch of Jerusalem.

Bausa was raised to the rank of cardinal by Pope Leo XIII on 23 May 1887, at the age of 66. Three days later, he was assigned as a Cardinal Deacon the deaconry of Santa Maria in Domnica.

On 17 January 1882, Bausa was appointed Master of the Sacred Palace. He served in that position until 23 May 1887.

On 11 February 1889, Bausa was appointed Archbishop of Florence and raised to the order of Cardinal Priests with the title of Santa Sabina. On 24 March 1889, he was consecrated as bishop by Pope Leo XIII, with co-consecrators Archbishop Francesco di Paola Cassetta and Bishop Guglielmo Giosafat Giuseppe Pifferi, OSA.

He was a strong opponent of blasphemy and desecration of religious holidays, and strong loyalty to Mary and the Eucharist. He frequently spoke for these causes when visiting parishes and their pastors, as well as by his preaching and his numerous writings.

He died on 15 April 1899 at the age of 78. Bausa's coat of arms adorns a corner of the Archiepiscopal Palace of Florence.
