= Mario Carità =

- Carità (center) with two members of his banda
- Born: 3 May 1904; Milan, Kingdom of Italy
- Died: 19 May 1945 (aged 41); Kastelruth, Italy
- Military career
- Allegiance: Kingdom of Italy; Italian Social Republic
- Branch: MVSN; Republican Police Corps
- Rank: Major
- Conflicts: Italian invasion of Albania; World War II; Greco-Italian War; Axis invasion of Yugoslavia; Italian Civil War

Mario Carità (3 May 1904 – 19 May 1945) was an Italian Fascist soldier and policeman, leader of the Banda Carità, a group infamous for the atrocities committed during its anti-partisan activities in the Italian Social Republic.

== Biography ==
Born to unknown parents, he lived his youth in Lodi, and joined the Fascist movement at age fifteen, becoming a squadrista in the "action squad" led by Luigi Freddi. In 1919 he was arrested for having fired on the crowd during an electoral rally in Milan; he was later involved in the murder of an anti-Fascist. In the 1920s he moved to Florence, where he worked as radio salesman, and after being fired for fraud, he opened his own radio repair shop, which he later expanded to include a gambling den.

In 1939 he volunteered in the Volunteer Militia for National Security during the Italian invasion of Albania, and later fought in the Greco-Italian War and in Yugoslavia, with the rank of centurione (Captain). He later returned to his shop in Florence, secretly working as informer for the OVRA and exploiting his job to report to the police customers who confided to him that they were secretly listening to Radio London.

The Armistice of Cassibile found him in Bologna, where he tried to reopen the local section of the National Fascist Party, which had closed down following the fall of the regime on 25 July 1943. He then returned to Florence on 17 September 1943, where he joined the Italian Social Republic and founded a special police unit, the Reparto Servizi Speciali (Special Services Unit), devoted to repression of anti-Fascist activities, which would become best known as "Banda Carità" ("Carità gang"); its members initially numbered about sixty, divided into three groups, and soon became infamous for their widespread use of torture (such as beatings, electrical shocks and tearing of nails) on suspected Resistance members. Members of the Banda Carità later grew to nearly two hundred, including several common criminals; among them was Pietro Koch, who would later go on to establish his own infamous "gang". Another prominent member of the Banda Carità was Epaminonda Troya, a Benedictine monk, who played Neapolitan songs or Schubert's Symphony No. 8 at the piano to cover the screams of the victims during their torture. Carità's daughters, 17-year-old Elisa and twenty-year-old Franca, also participated in torture sessions. Carità, like many members of his band, was a cocaine addict.

On 2 November 1943 Carità's unit arrested all members of the military committee of the Florentine National Liberation Committee (among them Adone Zoli), with the exception of Communist Alessandro Sinigaglia. In December the Reparto Servizi Speciali was merged with the Ufficio Politico Investigativo (Political Investigative Office) of Florence of the Republican National Guard (GNR), being renamed Ufficio II of the GNR Command of Florence. Carità's methods disgusted even supporters of the regime, among them philosopher Giovanni Gentile, as well as the German allies, who reported his excesses in their internal reports. Addressing these accusations, Carità personally wrote to Mussolini on 14 December 1943, claiming that his actions had been exaggerated and that he was merely reviving the early traditions of squadrismo, the only methods that would be effective in crushing the enemies of the regime.

On 13 February 1944 the Banda Carità located Communist partisan leader Alessandro Sinigaglia, who was killed while trying to escape, and on 26 February a weapons depot of the Action Party was discovered and seized. Other members of the CLN were arrested, and the linotype of the partisan newspaper La Libertà was captured; for these successes, in late February 1944 Carità was promoted to seniore (Major). On 26 April 1944 his men captured another Communist Resistance leader, Bruno Fanciullacci, who was tortured without revealing anything and was later freed by a coup de main enacted by his comrades of the Gruppi di Azione Patriottica. On 7 June 1944, the Banda Carità arrested all members of Radio Cora, a clandestine radio that maintained contact between the Resistance and the Allies; five of its members were executed five days later, others were tortured (in some cases to death) and then sent to concentration camps in Germany.

On 8 July 1944, as the Allies advanced towards Florence, Carità left the city and moved to Bergantino and later to Padua, where he continued his anti-partisan activities, infiltrating members of his unit in the ranks of the Resistance and arresting and torturing political opposers. On 19 November 1944 Carità's men captured partisan leader Franco Sabatucci, who was imprisoned and torture for a month, before being killed in December during an escape attempt. In February 1945 his unit was transferred under direct German command and renamed Reparto Speciale Italiano (Italian Special Unit). On 27 April 1945, with the collapse of the Italian Social Republic and partisan insurrections breaking out throughout northern Italy, the Banda Carità was dissolved; Carità fled to South Tyrol together with his two daughters and his lover Emilia Chiani, hiding in a farm in the Seiser Alm.

In the night between 18 and 19 May 1945, American soldiers entered the farm where Carità was hiding, finding him in bed with Chiani. Carità grabbed his gun and shot two American soldiers dead, but was killed in the ensuing shootout; Chiani was wounded by a stray shot and captured, along with Carità's two daughters. A considerable amount of money was also found hidden in the farm. In September 1945 Carità's eldest daughter, Franca, was sentenced to sixteen years in prison for having participated in her father's torture sessions; four more members of the Banda Carità were sentenced to death (but only one sentence was actually carried out, the one against police brigadiere Antonio Corradeschi) and twenty to life imprisonment. These sentences were however reduced by later trials and amnesties, and by the mid-1950s all members of the Banda Carità were free.
