= List of Gothic Revival architecture =

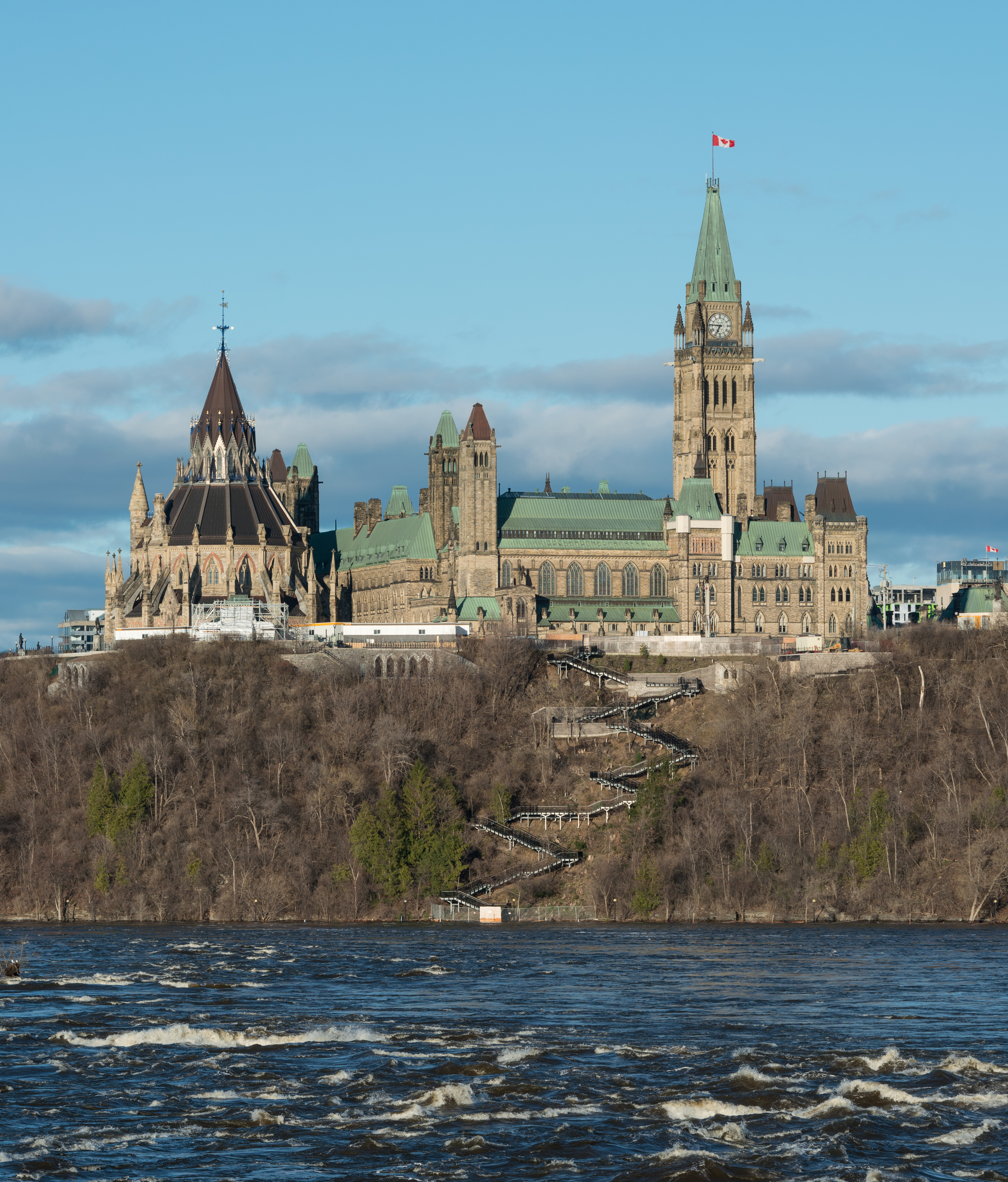
Parliament Hill, Ottawa, Canada

The following is a list of notable buildings in the Gothic Revival style.

== Argentina ==
- Cathedral of Bariloche
- Cathedral of La Plata
- Cathedral of Luján
- Cathedral of Mar del Plata

== Australia ==
=== New South Wales ===
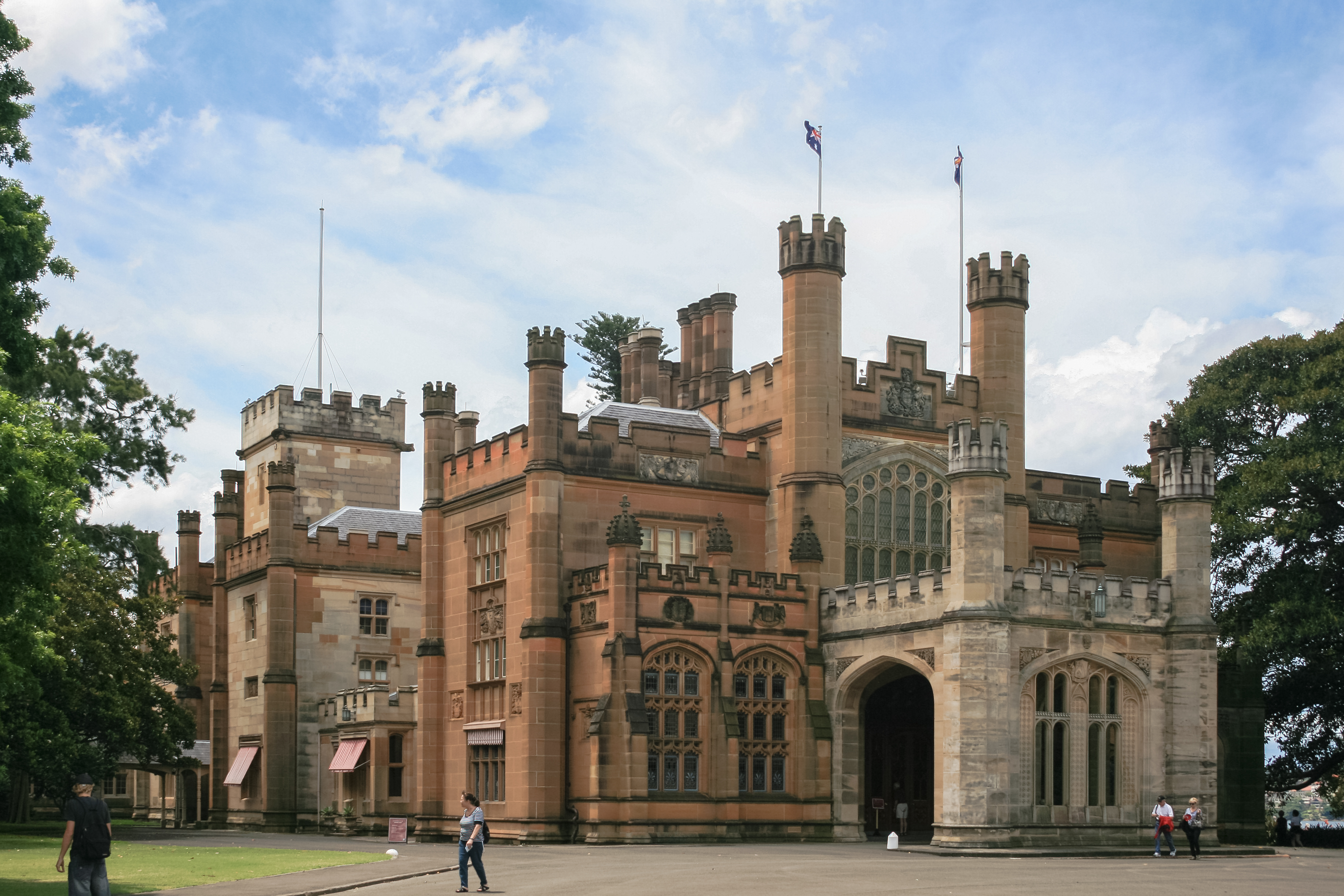
Government House, Sydney

- Cathedral of the Annunciation of Our Lady
- Crown Street Public School
- Garrison Church, Sydney
- Gladswood House
- Government House, Sydney
- Hunter Baillie Memorial Presbyterian Church
- Newington College, founders block
- Our Lady of the Sacred Heart Church, Randwick
- Regent Street railway station
- Sacred Heart Monastery
- St Andrew's Cathedral, Sydney
- St David's Uniting Church
- St John's Anglican Church, Darlinghurst
- St John's Cathedral, Parramatta
- St John's Uniting Church, Neutral Bay
- St Jude's Church, Randwick
- St Mark's Church, Darling Point
- St Michael's Anglican Church, Surry Hills
- St Mary's Anglican Church, Waverley
- St Mary's Cathedral, Sydney
- St Patrick's Seminary
- St Paul's Anglican Church, Burwood
- St Paul's Anglican Church, Carlingford
- St Peter's Church, Darlinghurst
- St Peters Church, St Peters
- St Philip's Church, Sydney
- St Stephen's Anglican Church, Newtown
- St Thomas' Anglican Church, North Sydney
- Sydney Conservatorium of Music, the old Government stable block.
- Sydney University, the main building, commenced 1850s, extended 20th century
- Vaucluse House Sydney Regency Gothic.

=== Victoria ===
- Scots' Church, Melbourne
- St Patrick's Cathedral, Melbourne
- St Paul's Cathedral, Melbourne
- Melbourne University – Main Building, Newman College and Ormond College
- The Collins Street group in Melbourne – Rialto buildings, Former Stock Exchange, Gothic Bank, Goode House and Olderfleet buildings and Safe Deposit Building

=== Queensland ===
- Cathedral of St Stephen, Brisbane
- St John's Cathedral (Brisbane)
- Albert Street Uniting Church
- St Luke's Anglican Church, Toowoomba
- Second St Mary's Church, Warwick

=== Western Australia ===
- Perth Town Hall

=== South Australia ===
- Beehive Corner, Adelaide city centre
- St Peter's Cathedral, Adelaide

=== Tasmania ===
- Church of the Apostles, Launceston
- St David's Cathedral, Hobart
- Government House, Hobart

== Austria ==
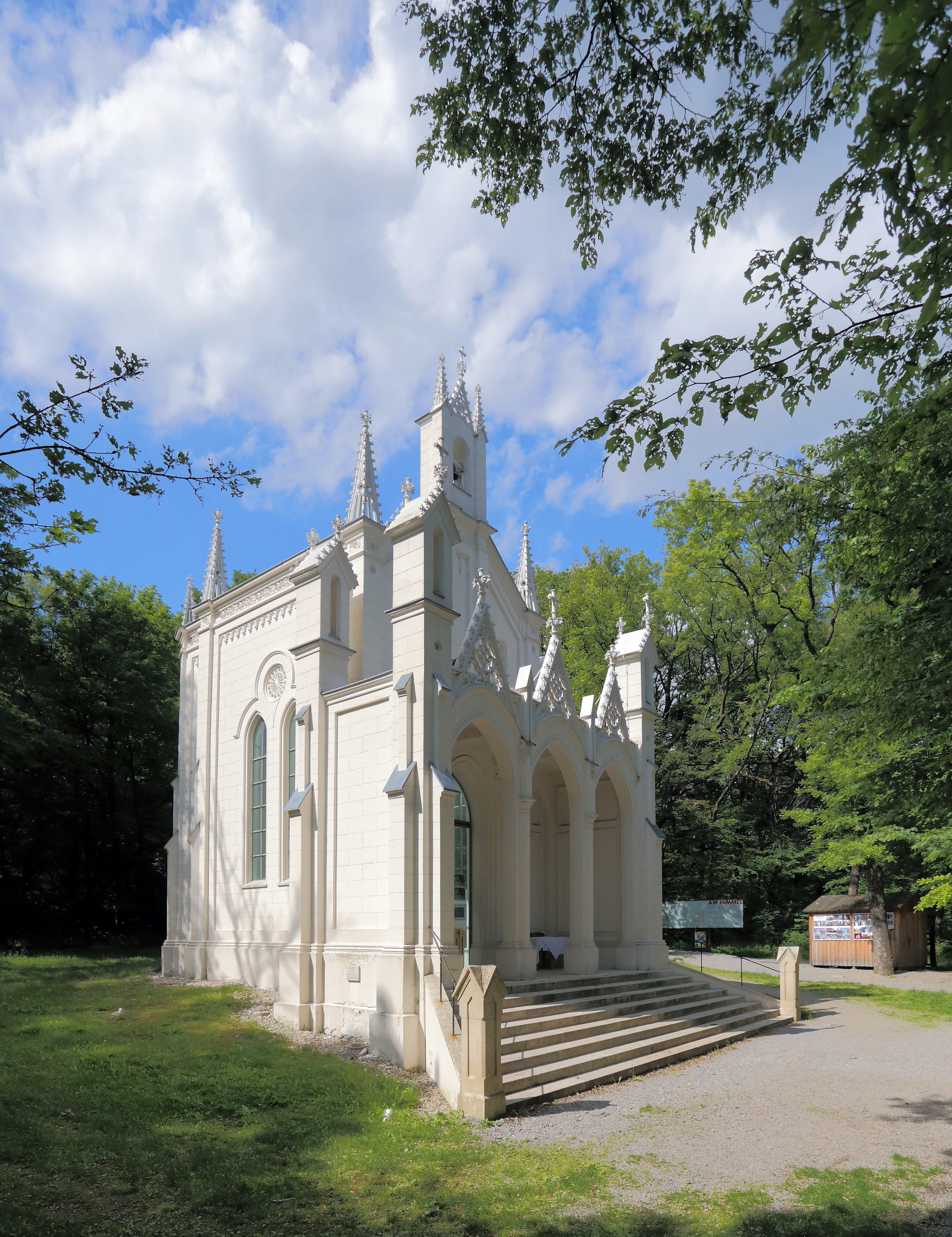
Sisi Chapel, Sievering

- Votivkirche, Vienna, 1856–79
- Rathaus, Vienna, 1872–83
- Johanneskirche, Klagenfurt
- Sisi Chapel located in the Sievering area of the Viennese district of Döbling near the Vienna Woods

== Azerbaijan ==
- Church of the Saviour, Baku, 1896-1899

== Barbados ==
- Parliament of Barbados, west-wing completed 1872, east-wing in 1873.
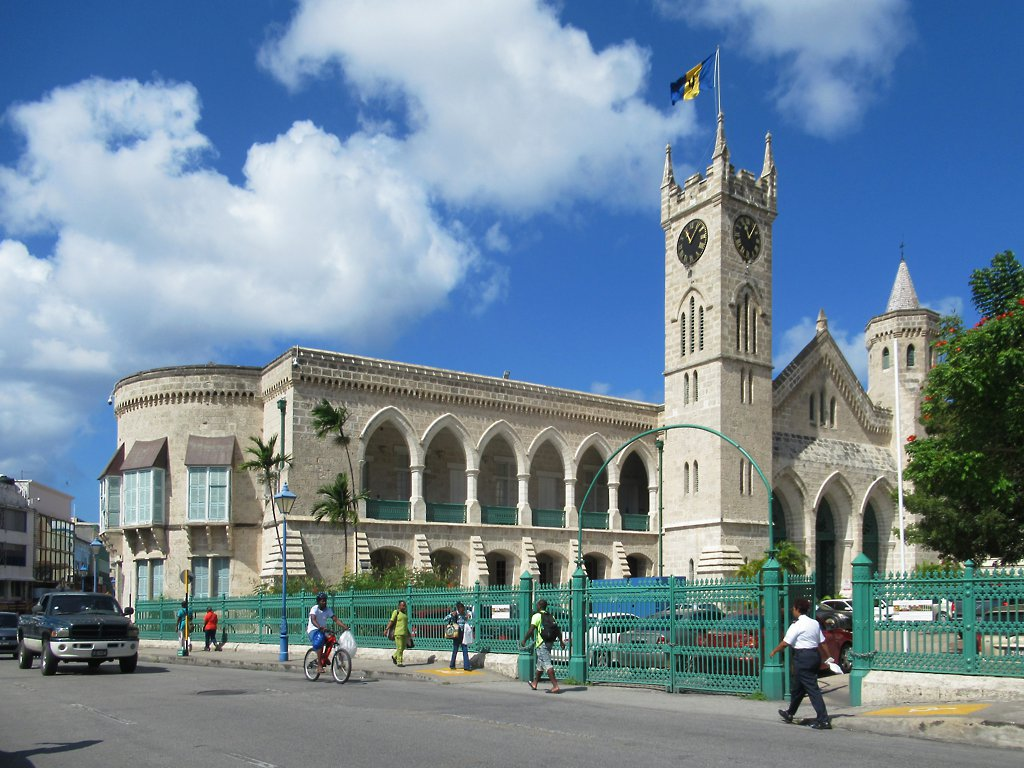
  Parliament of Barbados

== Belgium ==
- Maredsous Abbey, 1872–1892
- Loppem Castle, 1856–1869
- Church of Hunnegem, paintings 1856–1869
- Sint-Petrus-en-Pauluskerk, Ostend, 1899–1908
- Church of Our Lady of Laeken, Brussels, 1854–1909

== Bosnia and Herzegovina ==
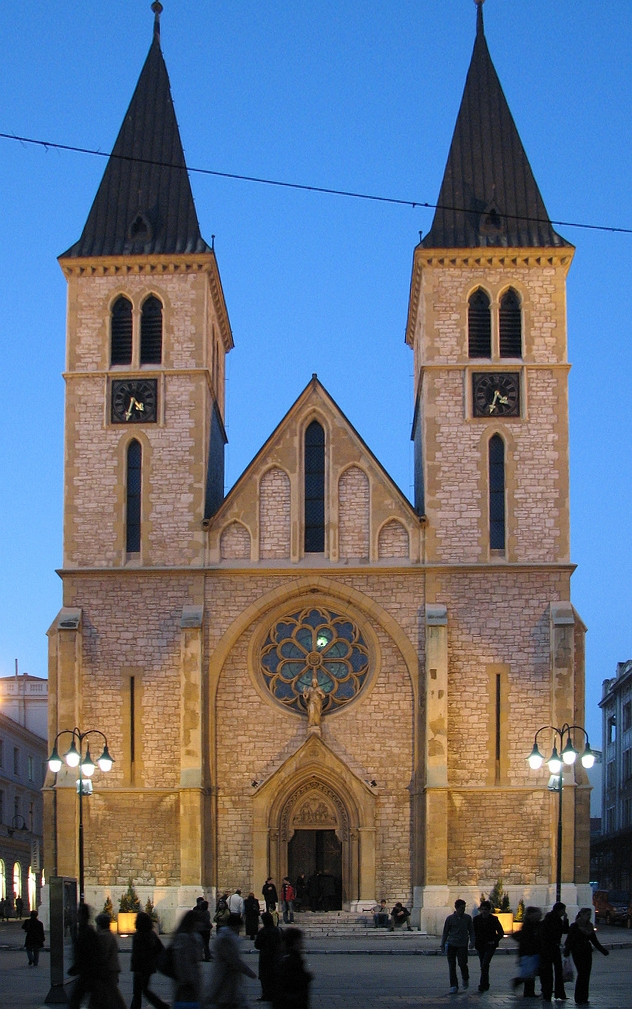
Cathedral of Jesus' Heart, Sarajevo

- Cathedral of Jesus' Heart, Sarajevo, 1887

== Brazil ==
- Church of Our Lady of Purification, Bom Princípio
- Sanctuary of Our Lady Mother of Humanity (Caraça), Minas Gerais
- Basilica of the Immaculate Conception, Rio de Janeiro
- Cathedral of Our Lady of Exile, Jundiaí
- Cathedral of Santa Teresa, Caxias do Sul
- St. Peter of Alcantara Cathedral, Petrópolis
- Church os Saint Peter, Porto Alegre
- Catedral of Our Lady of Boa Viagem, Belo Horizonte
- Church of Santa Rita, Santa Rita do Passa Quatro
- Church of The Holy Sacrament and Santa Teresa, Porto Alegre
- São Paulo Sé Cathedral (Catedral da Sé de São Paulo), São Paulo
- Premonstratensian Seminary Chapel, Pirapora do Bom Jesus
- Sanctuary of Santa Teresinha, Taubaté
- São João Batista Cathedral (Catedral São João Batista), Santa Cruz do Sul, 1928–1932
- Church of Our Lady of the Glory, Sinimbu, 1927
- Basilica of Santo Antonio, Santos, 1929
- Church of Our Lady of Lourdes (Catedral da Pedra), Canela, 1987
- Basilica of Our Lady of the Rosary, Caieiras, 2006
- Basilica of Our Lady of the Rosary of Fatima, Embu das Artes, São Paulo, 2004

== Canada ==
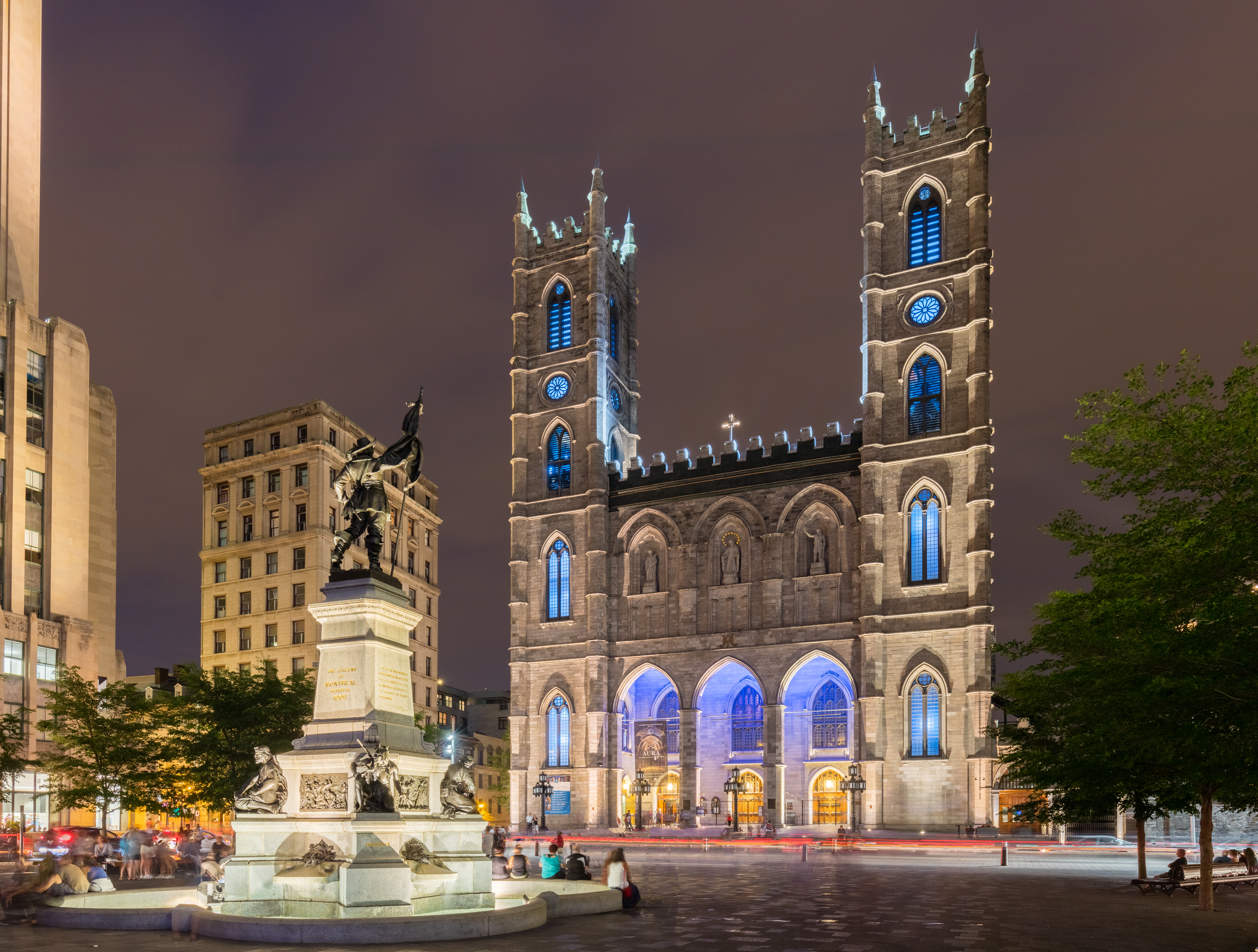
Notre-Dame Basilica, Montreal

- Parliament Hill, Ottawa, Ontario, 1878
- Notre-Dame Basilica, Montreal, Quebec, 1829
- St. James' Cathedral, Toronto, Ontario, 1853
- Cathedral of St. John the Baptist St. John's, Newfoundland, 1847–85
- Church of Our Lady Immaculate, Guelph, Ontario, 1888
- Currie Hall, Royal Military College of Canada, Kingston, Ontario, 1922
- College Building, Saskatoon, Saskatchewan (1913)
- Little Trinity Anglican Church, 1843, Toronto, Ontario – Tudor Gothic revival
- Church of the Holy Trinity (Toronto), 1847, Toronto, Ontario
- St. Dunstan's Basilica 1916, Charlottetown, PEI
- Hart House at the University of Toronto, 1911–1919, Toronto, Ontario
- 1 Spadina Crescent, at the University of Toronto, Toronto, Ontario, 1875
- Burwash Hall at Victoria University in the University of Toronto, Toronto, Ontario
- Cathedral of St. John the Baptist, St. John's
- St. Patrick's Church, St. John's
- St. Peter's Cathedral (London), London, Ontario, 1885
- St. Patrick's Basilica, Montreal, Montreal, 1847
- Ottawa Normal School, Ottawa, Ontario, 1874
- St. Patrick's Basilica (Ottawa), Ottawa, Ontario, 1875
- First Baptist Church (Ottawa), Ottawa, Ontario, 1878
- Confederation Building (Ottawa), Ottawa, Ontario, 1931
- Christ Church Cathedral, Montreal
- St. Michael's Basilica, Chatham, New Brunswick
- St. Mary's Basilica (Halifax), Halifax Regional Municipality, Nova Scotia, 1899
- St. Michael's Cathedral, Toronto, Toronto, Ontario, 1845
- Church of the Redeemer (Toronto), Toronto, Ontario, 1879
- St. James Anglican Church, Vancouver, British Columbia
- Bathurst Street Theatre, Toronto, Ontario, 1888
- Bloor Street United Church, Toronto, Ontario, 1890
- Casa Loma, Toronto, Ontario, 1914

== Chile ==
- Federico Santa María Technical University, Valparaíso 1931
- Church of the Sacred Heart, Valparaíso
- Church of the Twelve Apostles, Valparaíso, 1869
- St. James Cathedral, Valparaíso, 1910
- Vergara Hall (Venetian Gothic), Viña del Mar, 1910

== China ==
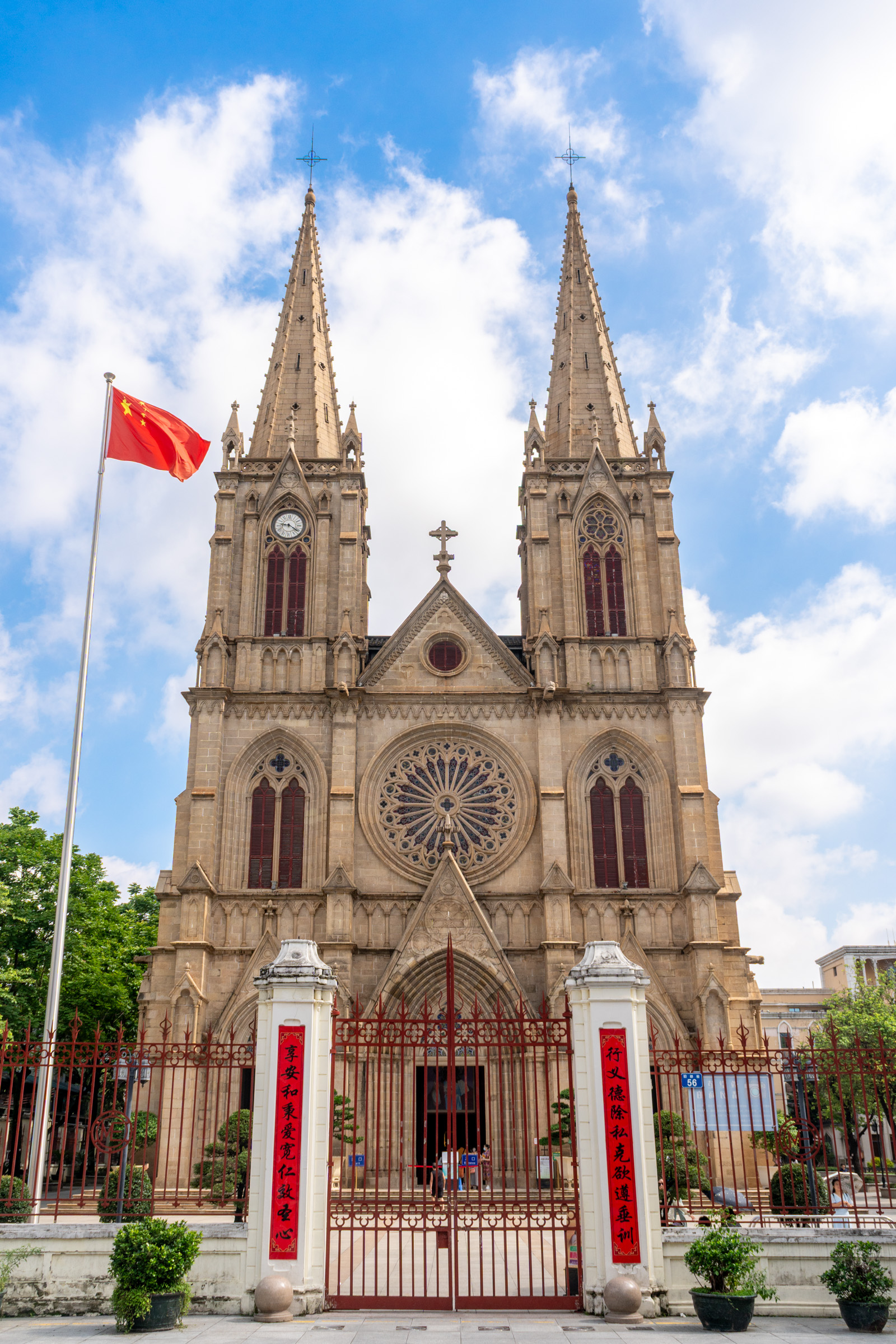
Sacred Heart Cathedral, Canton

- Church of Our Lady of Mount Carmel, Beijing
- Church of the Saviour, Beijing
- Teng Shih K'ou Congregational Church, Beijing
- Sacred Heart Cathedral, Canton, 1863–1888
- St. Theresa's Cathedral, Changchun
- St. John's Church, Chengdu
- St. Joseph's Cathedral, Chongqing
- Holy Cross Church, Wanzhou District, Chongqing
- Saint Dominic's Cathedral, Fuzhou
- St. John's Cathedral, Hong Kong
- Gospel Church, Jiangyou
- Sacred Heart Cathedral, Jinan
- St. John's Cathedral, Langzhong
- Gospel Church, Mianyang
- Our Lady of Lourdes Church, Mianyang
- Gospel Church, Mianzhu
- Holy Trinity Church, Shanghai
- National Shrine and Minor Basilica of Our Lady of Sheshan, Shanghai
- St. Ignatius Cathedral, Shanghai
- Sacred Heart Cathedral, Shengyang
- All Saints' Church, Tianjin

== Croatia ==
- Church of St Peter and St Paul, Osijek, 1898
- Hermann Bollé, Monumental cemetery Mirogoj, Zagreb, 1879–1929
- Paunović Family Mausoleum, Vukovar, 1890s
- Trakošćan Castle, Varaždin County, 1886
- Zagreb Cathedral, Zagreb, 1880

== Costa Rica ==
- Iglesia de Coronado, San Jose

== Czech Republic ==
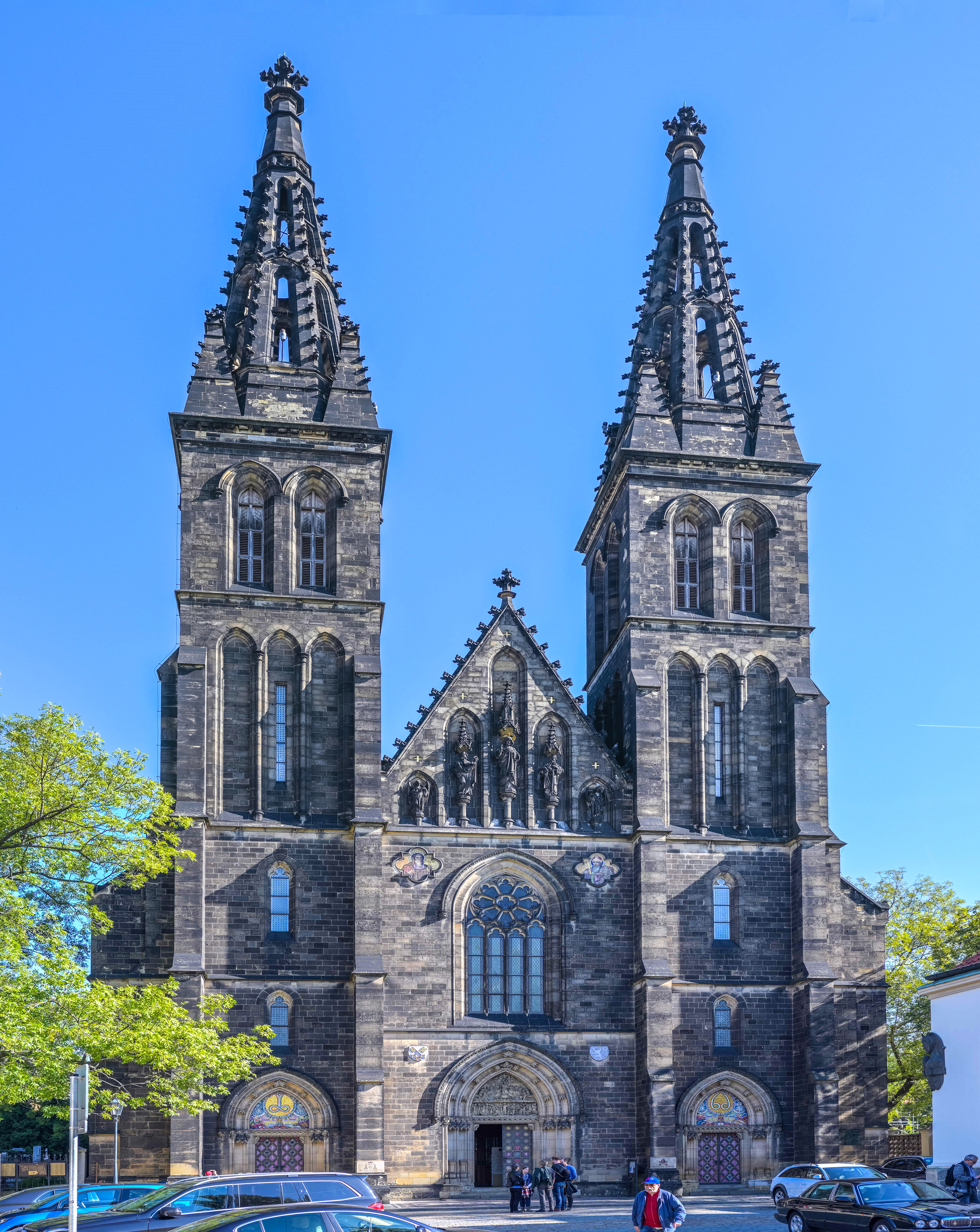
- Basilica of St Peter and St Paul, Prague
  Basilica of St Peter and St Paul, Prague
- Completion of St. Vitus Cathedral, Prague, 1870–1929
- Completion of Saint Wenceslas cathedral, Olomouc, 1883–92
- Hluboká Castle

== Denmark ==
- St. Ansgar's Cathedral, Copenhagen (1840–42)
- University of Copenhagen, Copenhagen, 1835
- Copenhagen University Library, Copenhagen, 1857–61
- St. John's Church, Copenhagen, Nørrebro, Copenhagen, 1861
- St. James's Church, Østerbro, Copenhagen, 1876–78
- Church of Our Lady, Aarhus, 1879–80
- St. Alban's Church, Copenhagen, 1885–87

== Ecuador ==
- Basílica del Voto Nacional, Quito, 1892
- Church of Saint Theresa, Quito, 1956

== Equatorial Guinea ==
- St. Elizabeth's Cathedral, Malabo, 1897–1916

== Finland ==
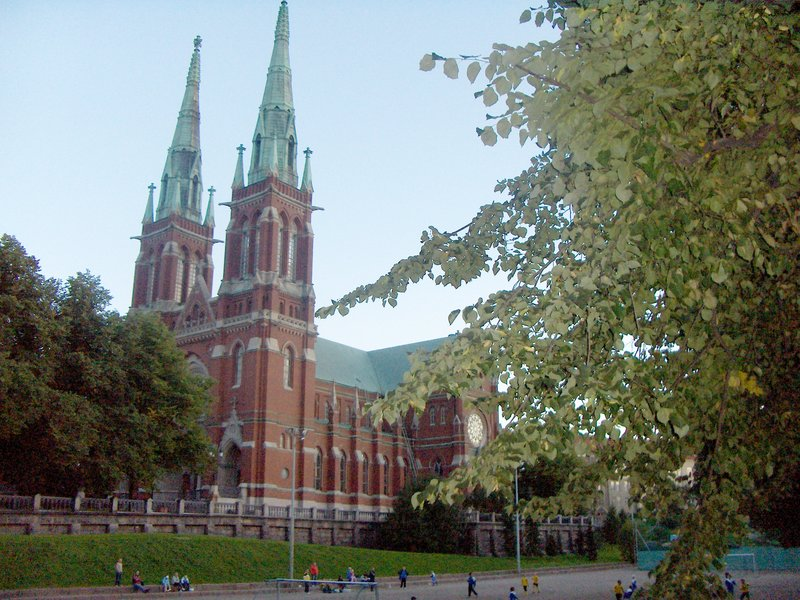
- St. John's Church, Helsinki
  St. Henry's Cathedral, Helsinki, 1858–1860
- Ritarihuone, Helsinki, 1862
- Heinävesi Church, Heinävesi, 1890–1891
- St. John's Church, Helsinki, 1888–1893
- Mikkeli Cathedral, Mikkeli, 1896–1897
- Joensuu Church, Joensuu, 1903

== France ==
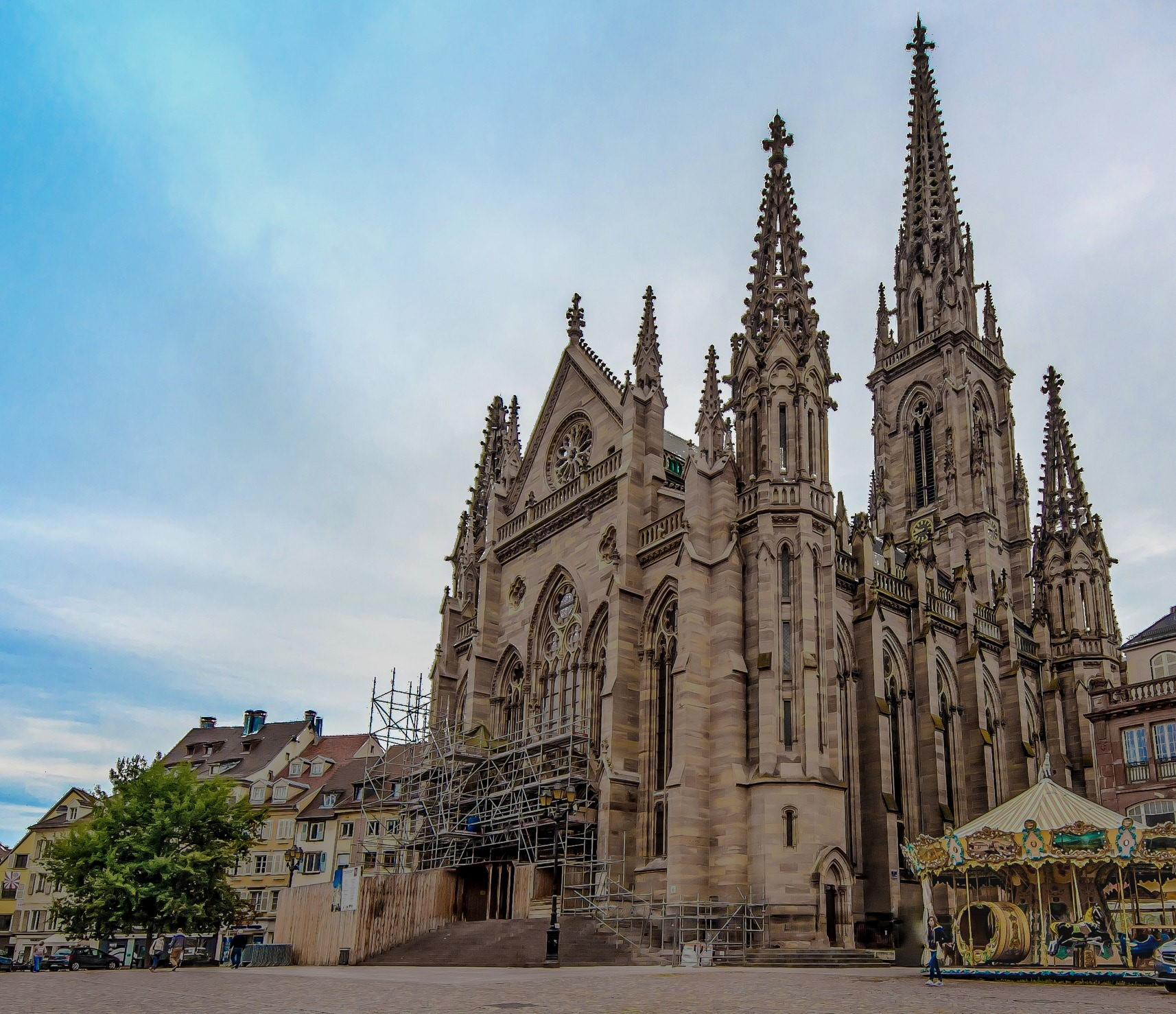
- Temple Saint-Étienne, Mulhouse
  Temple Saint-Étienne, Mulhouse
- Basilica of St. Clotilde, Paris
- Église Saint-Ambroise, Paris
- Église Saint-Georges, Lyon
- Jesuit Church, Molsheim
- St. Paul's Church, Strasbourg
- Basilica of the Sanctuary of Our Lady of Lourdes

== Germany ==
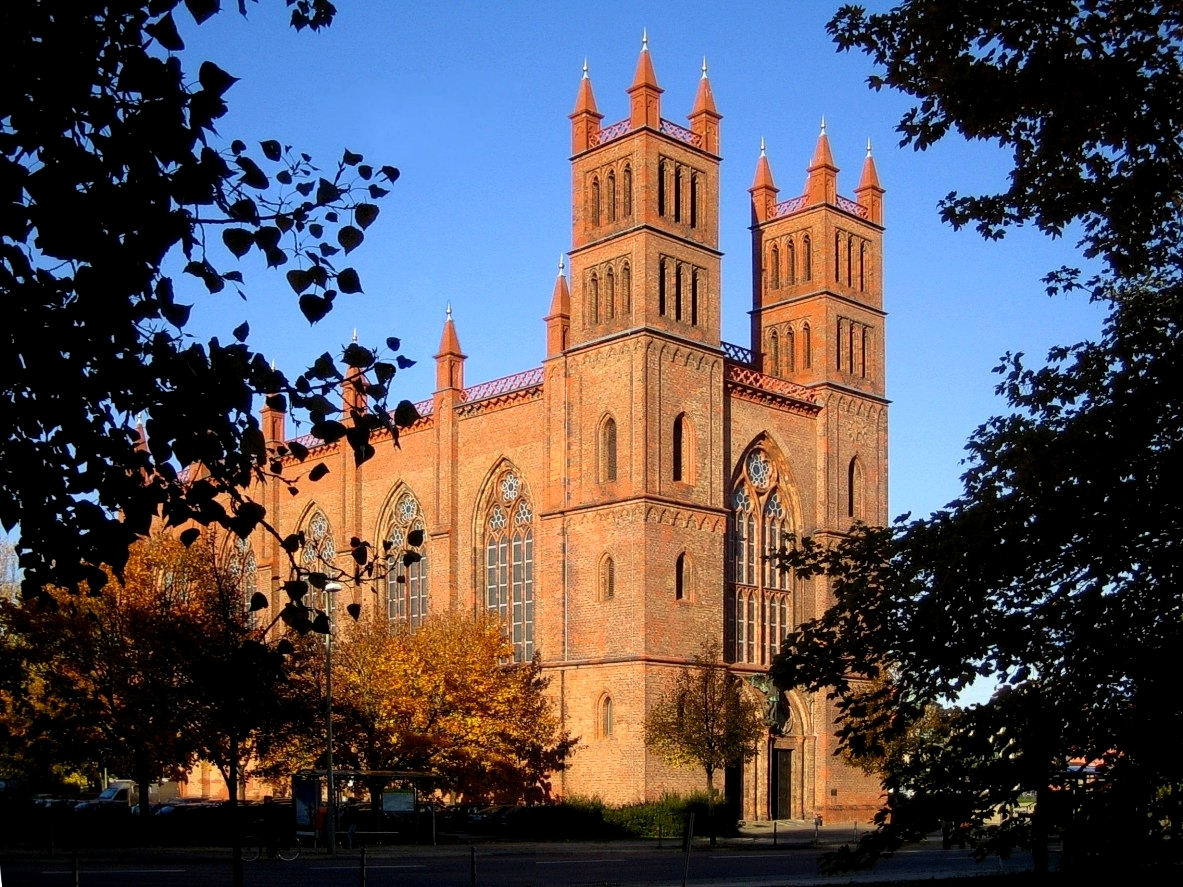
Friedrichswerdersche Kirche, Berlin

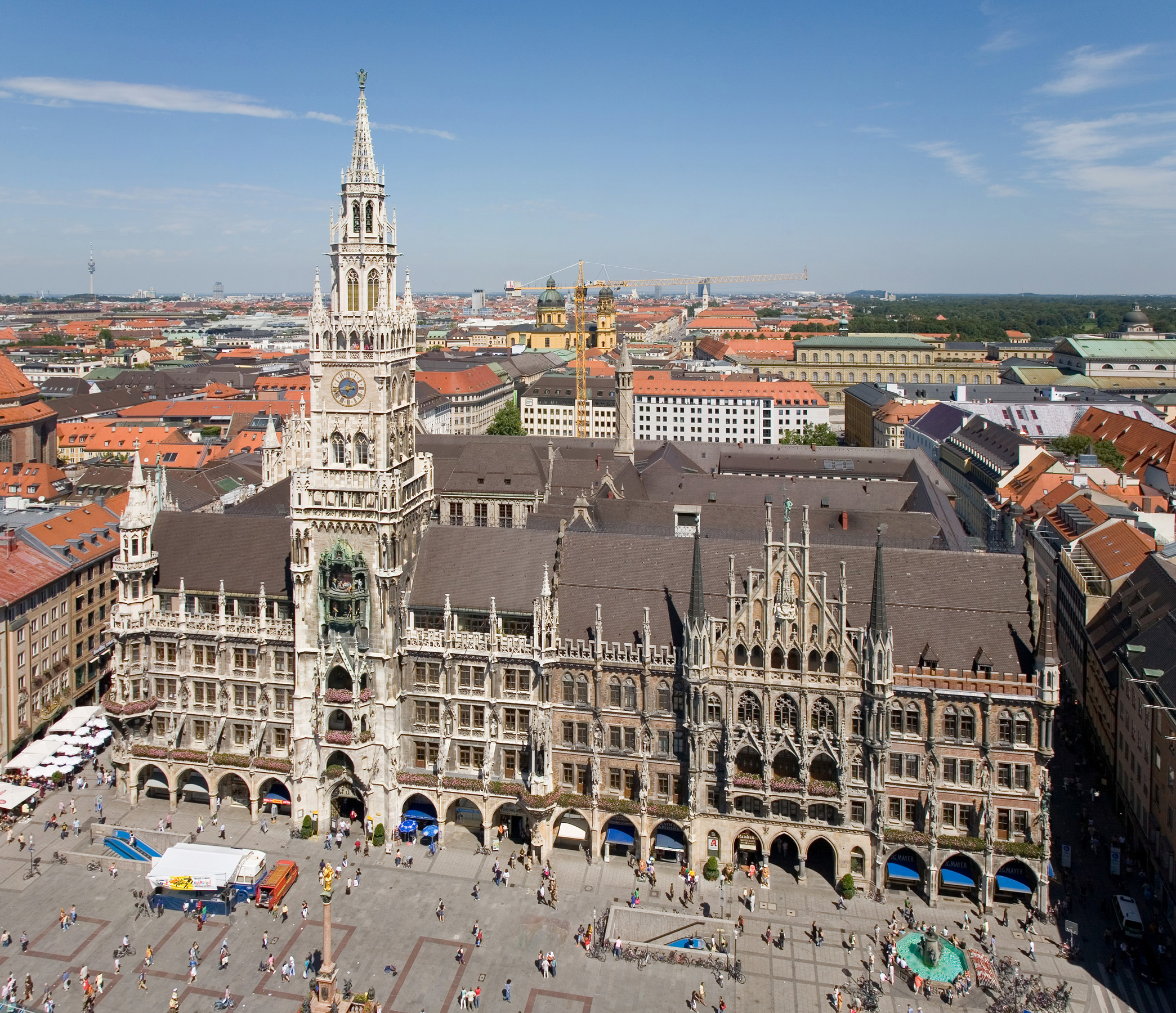
New Town Hall, Munich
- Nauener Tor, Potsdam, 1755
- Gothic House, Dessau-Wörlitz Garden Realm, 1774
- Friedrichswerdersche Kirche, Berlin, 1824–30
- Callenberg Castle, Coburg, 1857
- Castle in Kamenz (now Kamieniec Ząbkowicki in Poland), 1838–65
- Burg Hohenzollern, 1850–67
- Completion of Cologne Cathedral, 1842–80
- New Town Hall, Munich, 1867–1909
- St. Agnes, Cologne, 1896–1901
10 Gothic Revival churches in Hanover

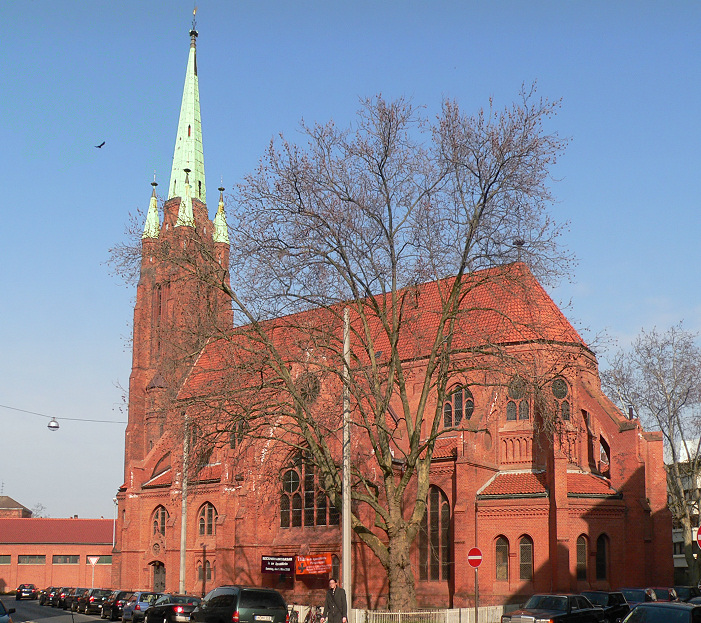

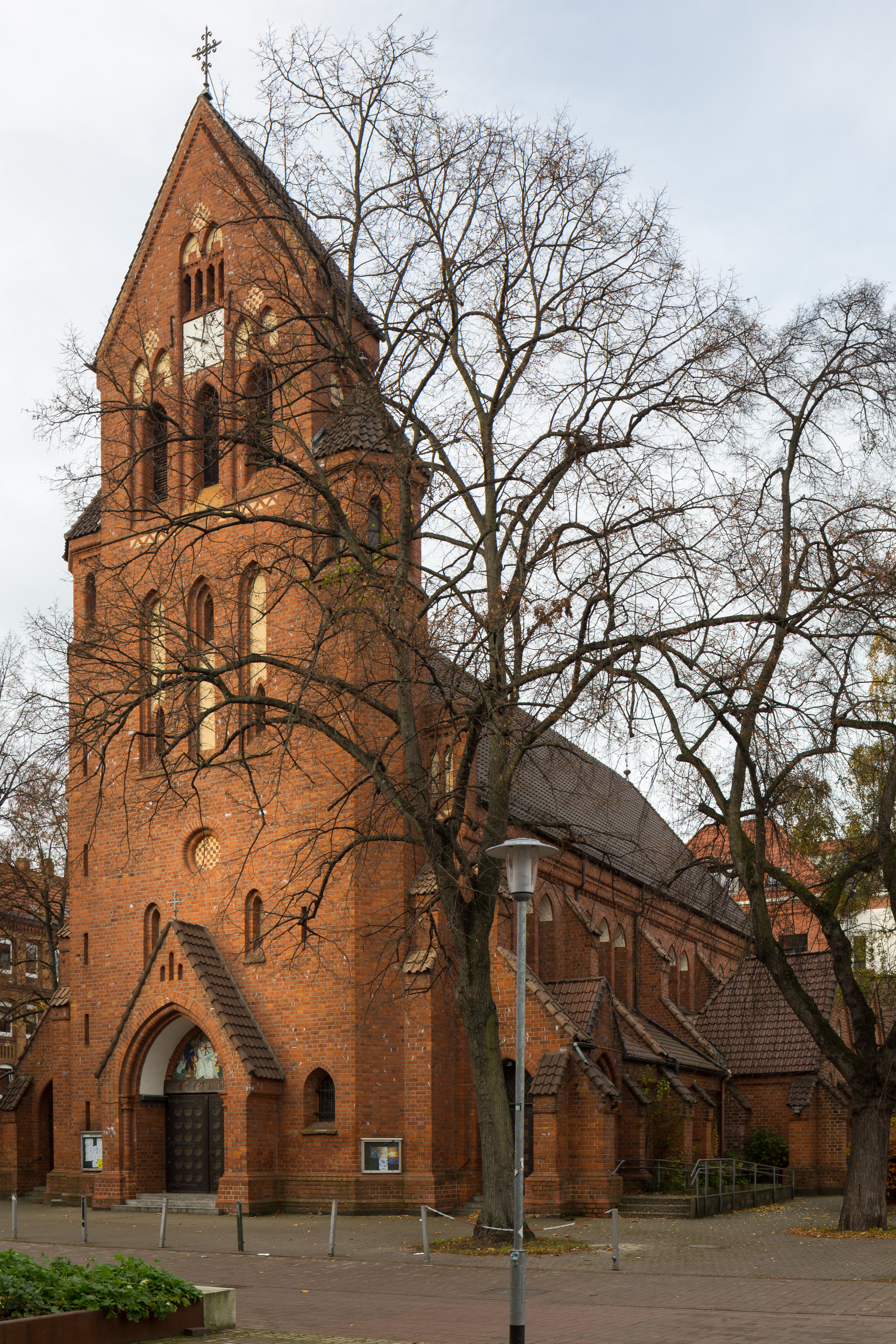

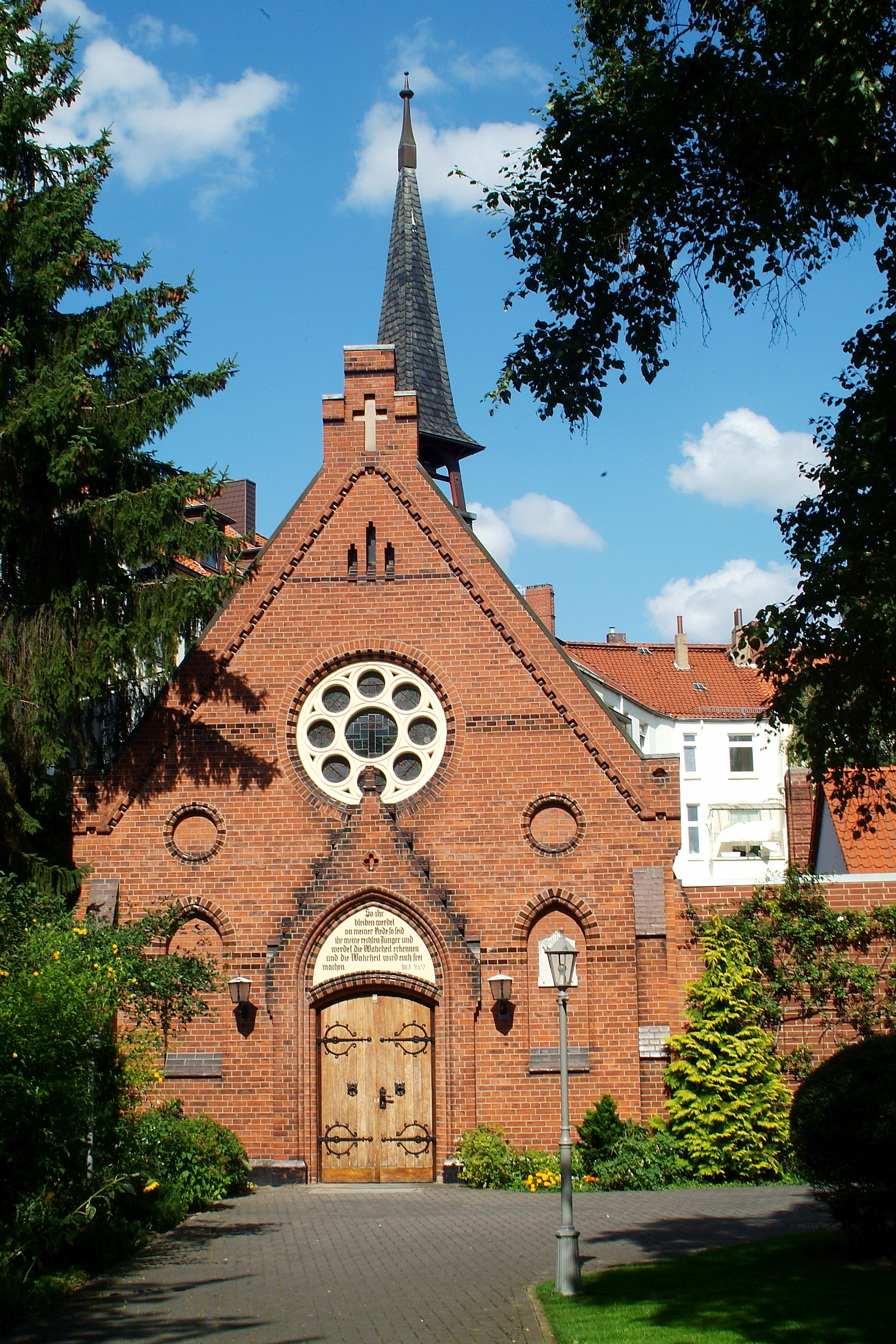

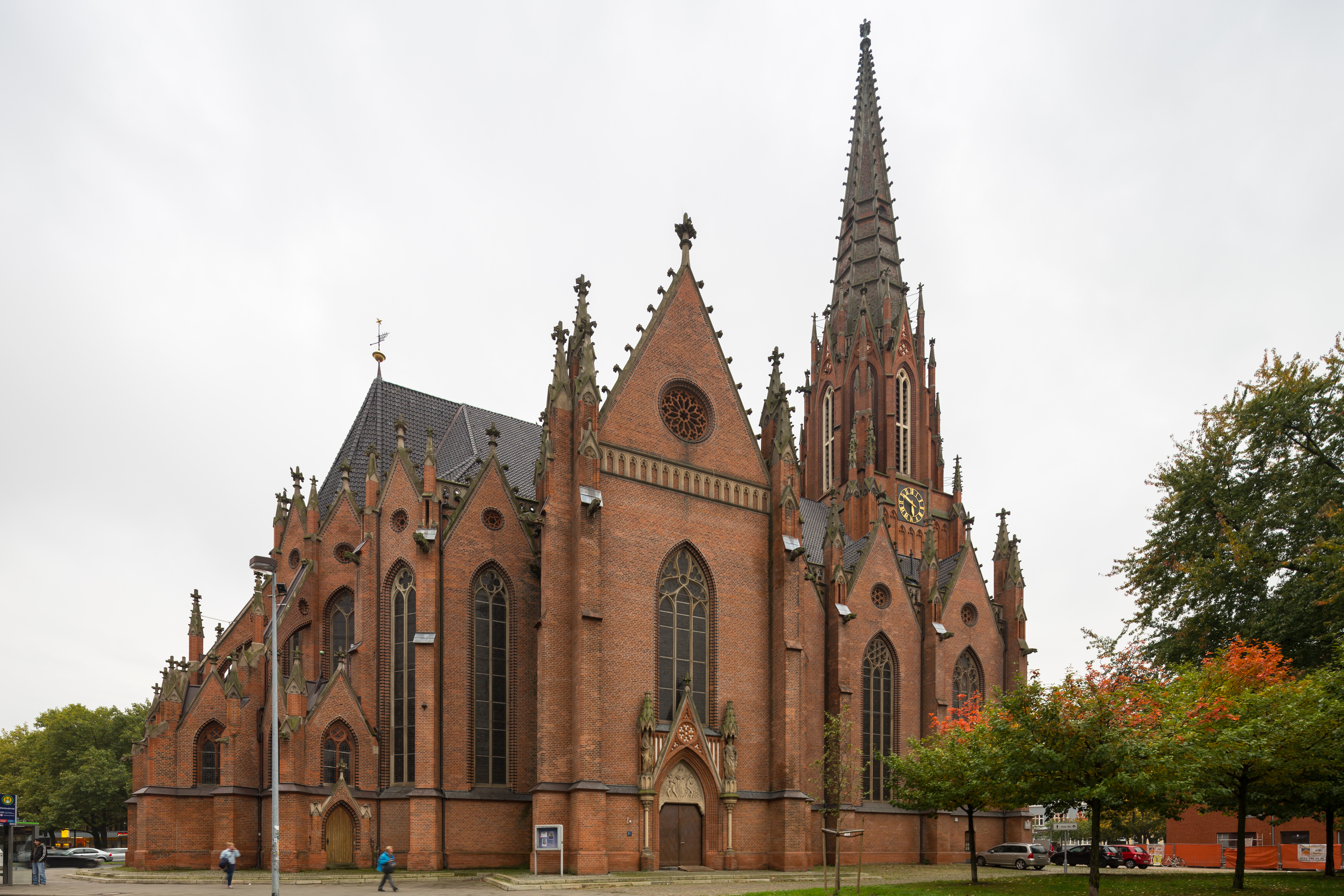

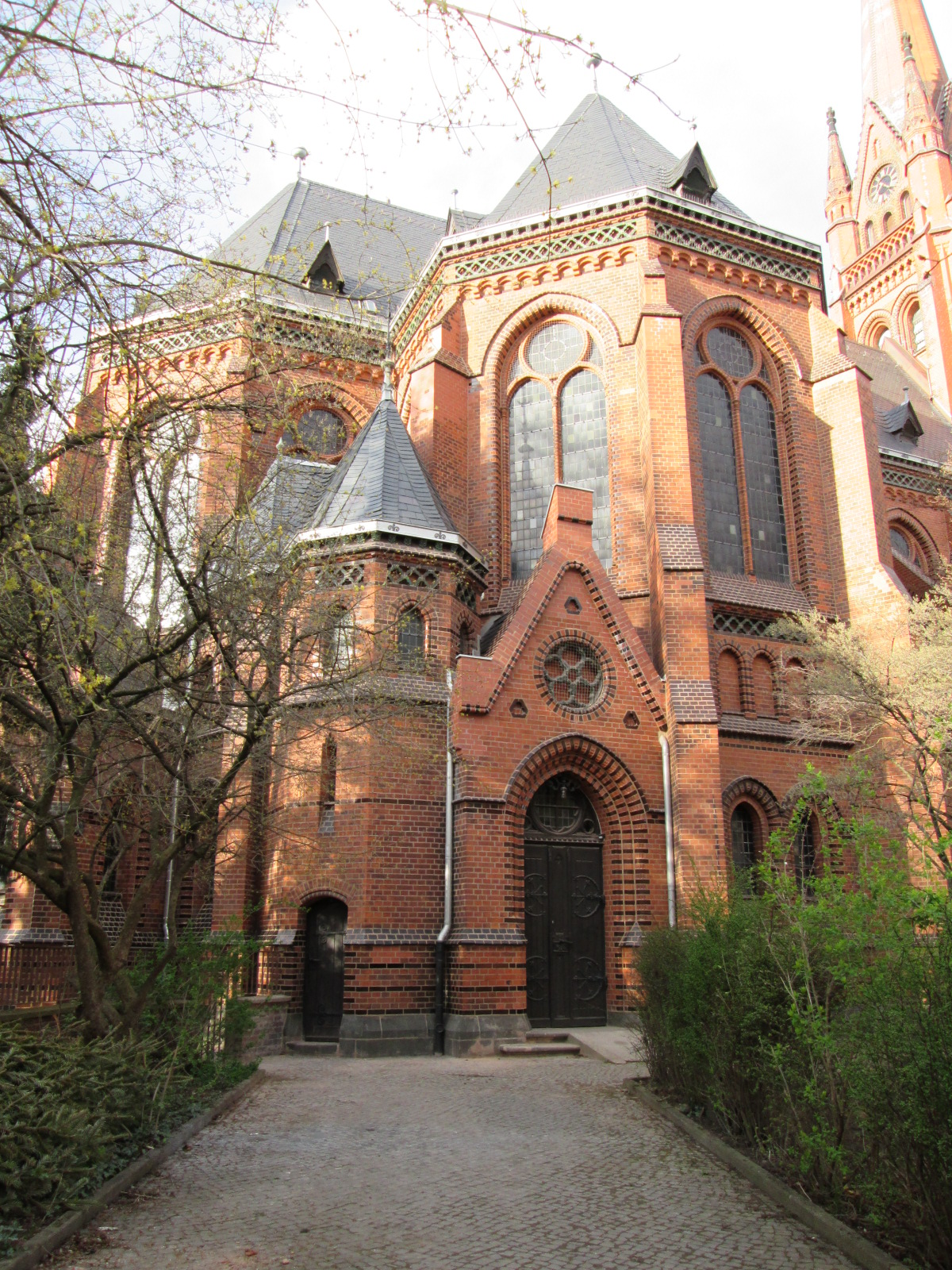

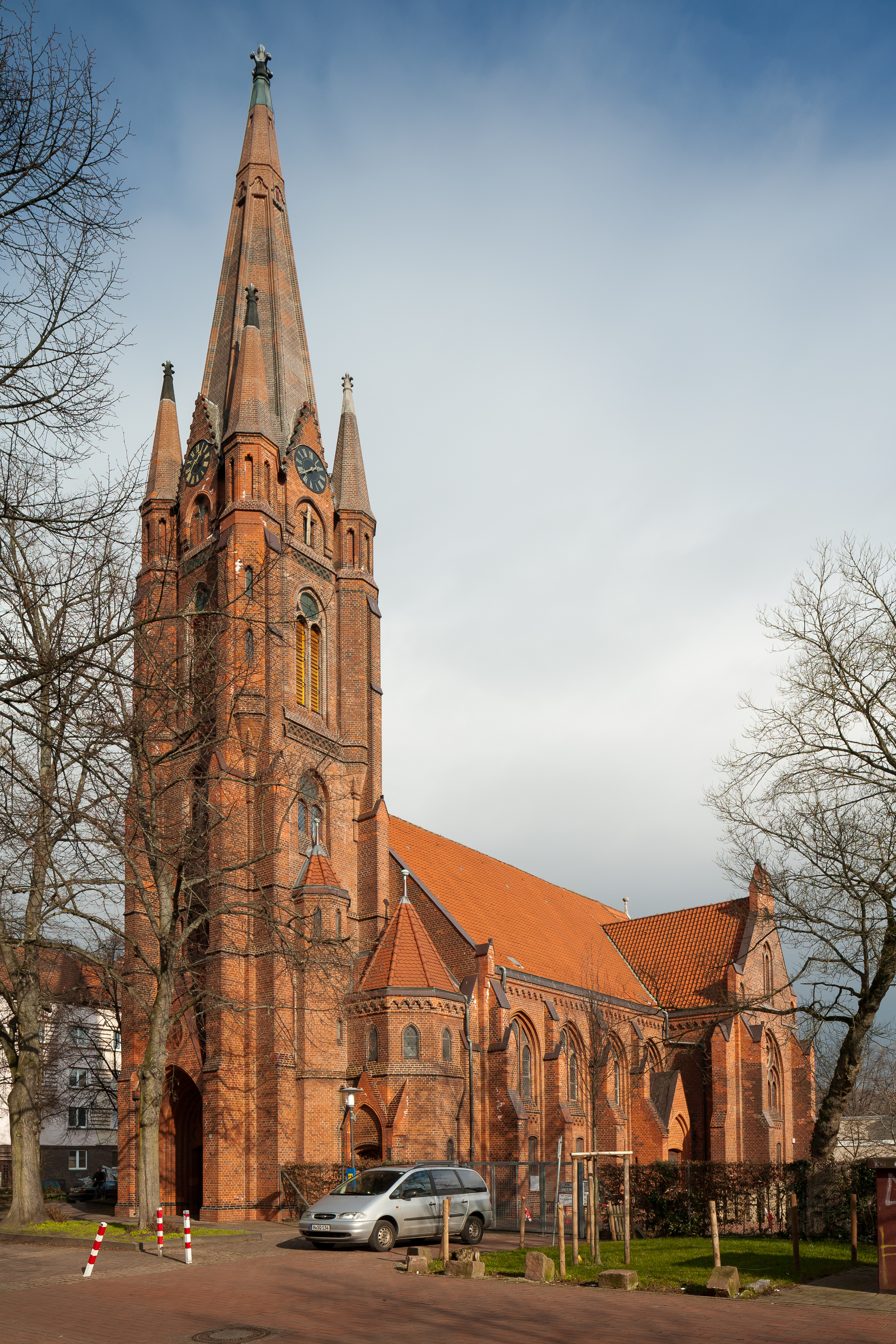

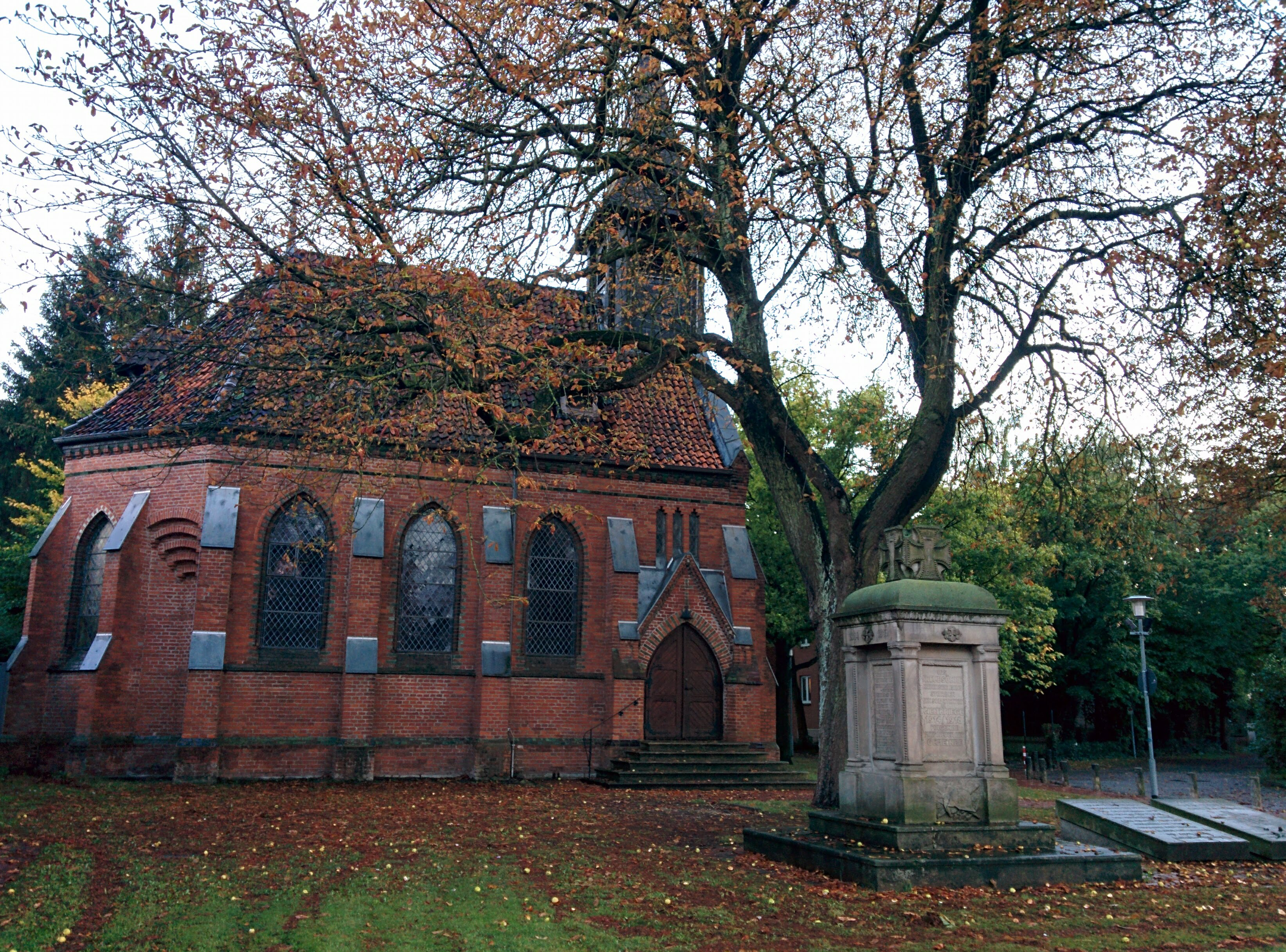

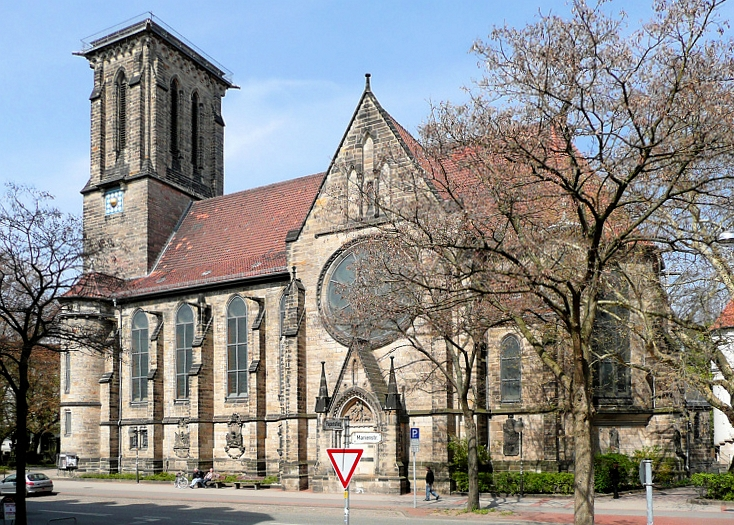

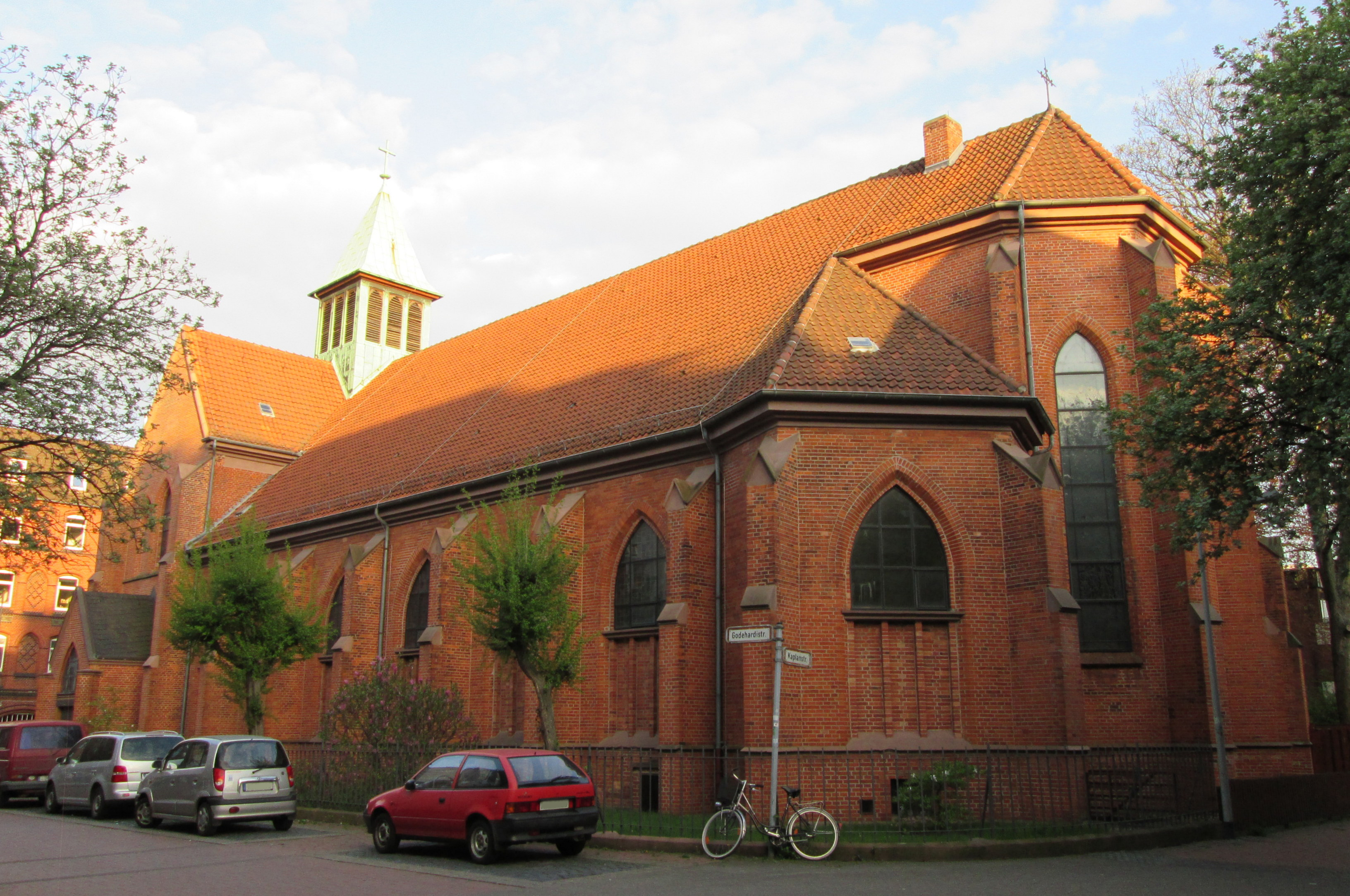

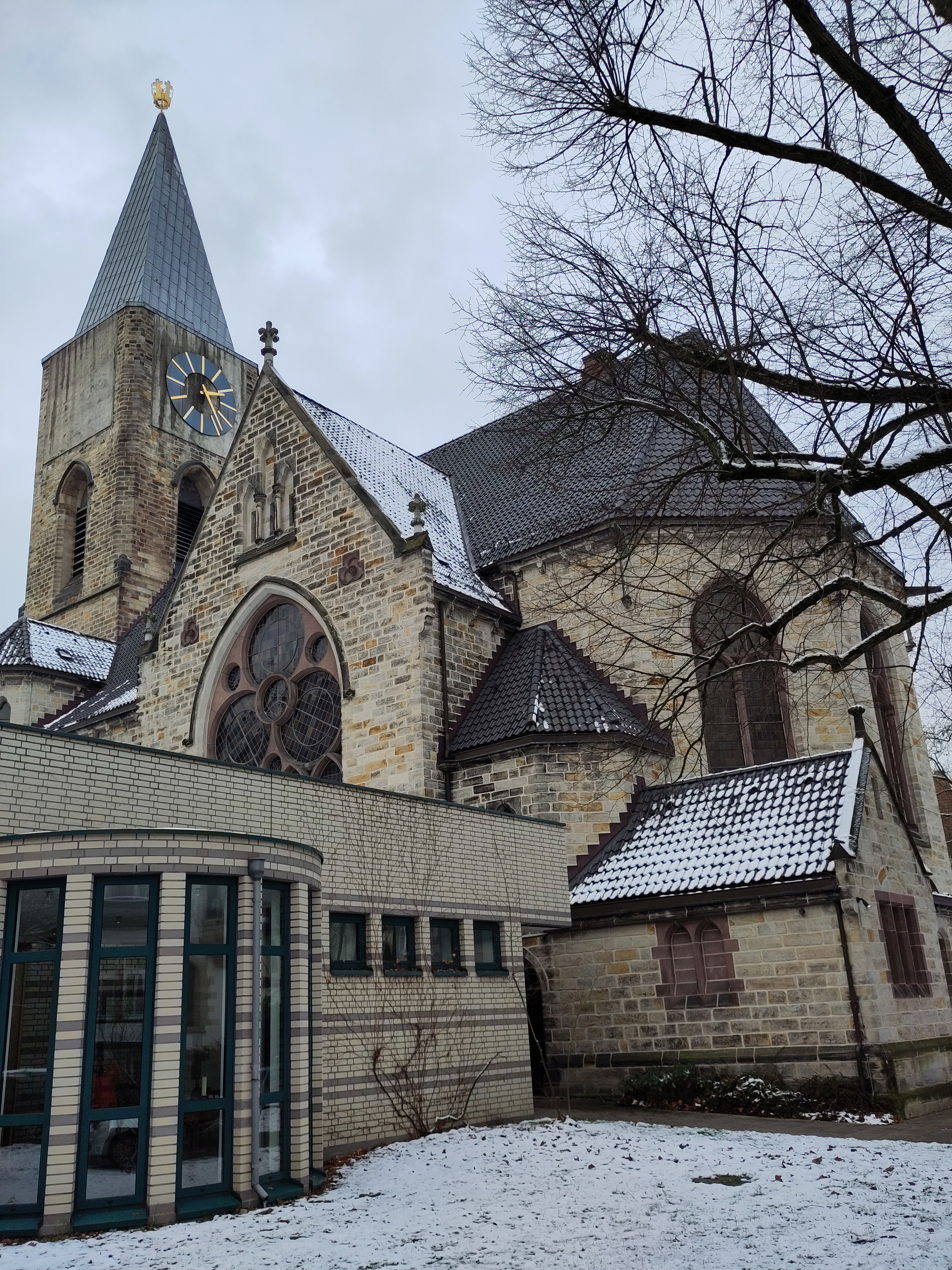

== Guyana ==
- St. George's Cathedral, Georgetown, 1894

== Hungary ==
- Sacred Heart Church, Kőszeg
- Hungarian Parliament Building, Budapest
- Matthias Church, Budapest

== India ==
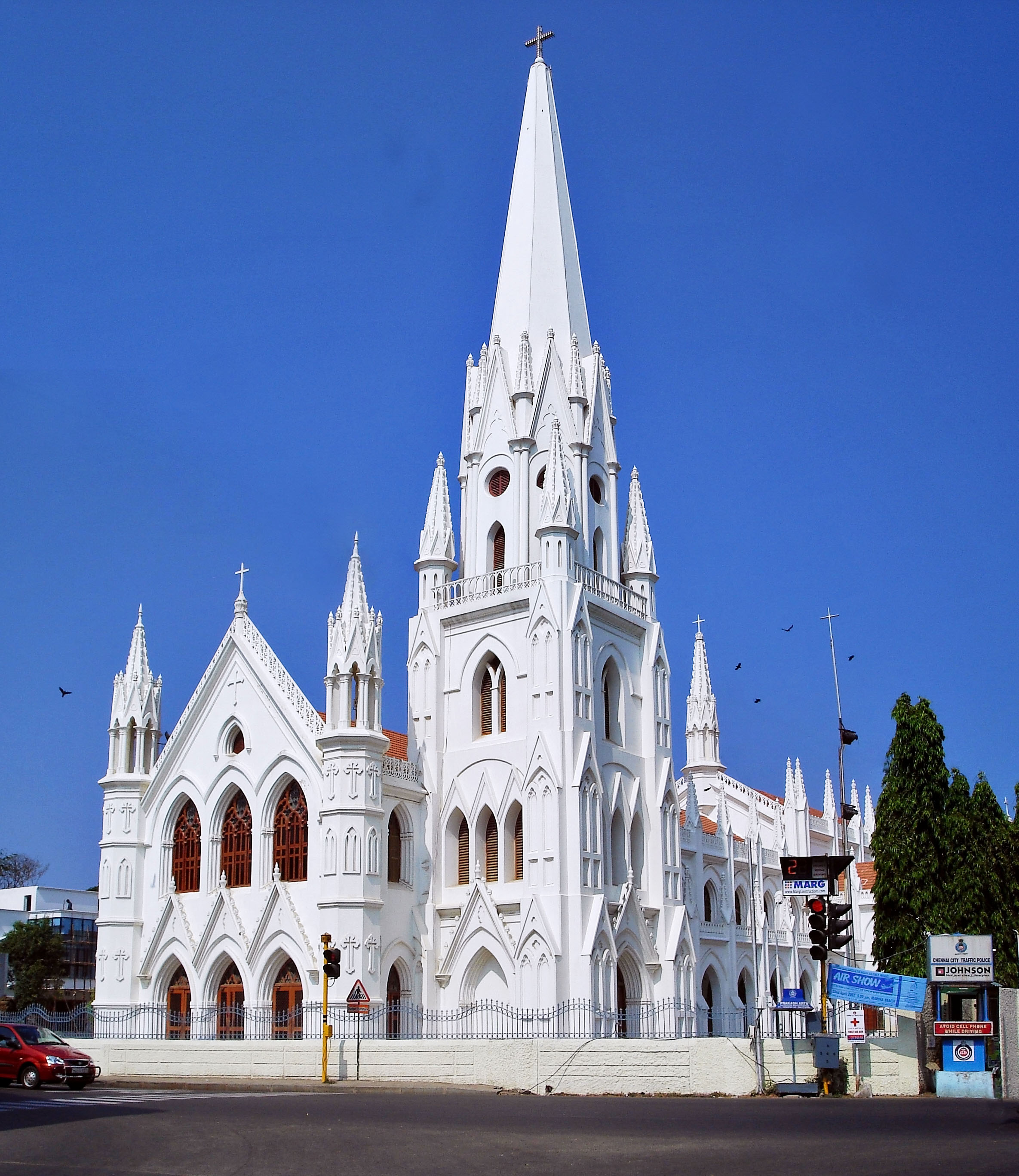
- San Thome Basilica, Chennai
  San Thome Basilica, Chennai, India
- St Paul Cathedral, Kolkata, India
- Kolkata High Court, Kolkata, India
- Mutiny Memorial, New Delhi, India
- St. Stephen's Church, New Delhi, India
- Our Lady of Ransom Church, Kanyakumari, India
- Cathedral of the Holy Name, Mumbai, India
- Marthandam CSI Church, Martandam, India
- Mount Mary Church, Bandra, Mumbai, India
- Chhatrapati Shivaji Terminus, Mumbai, India
- University of Mumbai, Mumbai, India
- Bombay High Court, Mumbai, India
- Wilson College, Mumbai, India
- David Sassoon Library, Mumbai, India
- St. Philomena's Church, Mysore, India
- Medak Cathedral, Medak, India

== Indonesia ==
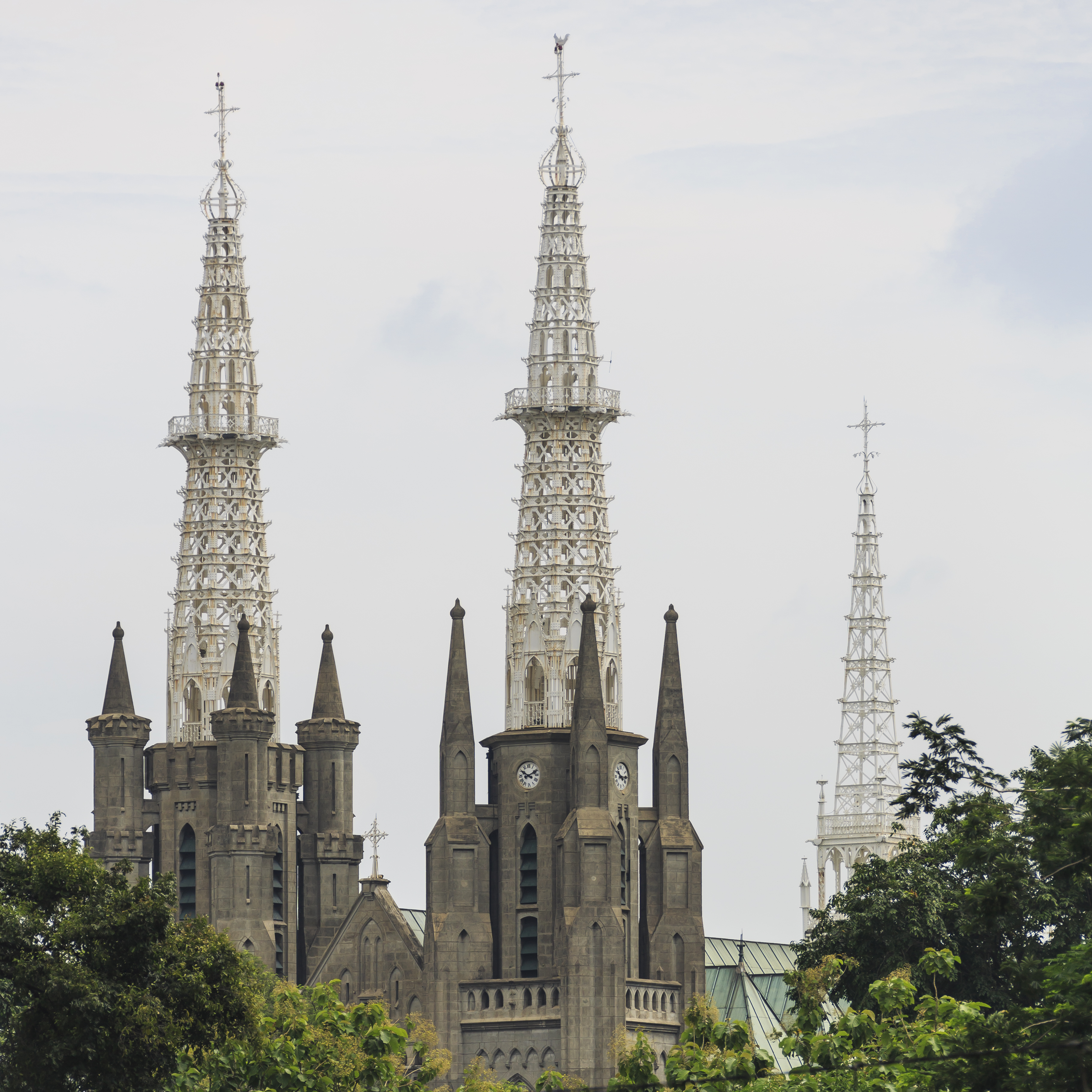
Church of our lady Assumption, Jakarta

- Church of our lady Assumption, Jakarta, Indonesia (Locally known as Gereja Katedral Jakarta)
- Cikini Hospital, Jakarta, Indonesia
- Immanuel Church, Kediri, Indonesia (Locally known as Gereja Merah)
- Immanuel Church, Malang, Indonesia (Locally known as Gereja Jago)
- Beth-El Church, Magelang, Indonesia
- Griya Mulya Church, Purworejo, Indonesia
- Ursula Chapel, Jakarta, Indonesia
- Church of the birth of our Lady Mary, Surabaya, Indonesia
- St. Peter's Church, Bandung, Indonesia
- St. Anthony of Padua Church, Pasuruan, Indonesia
- St. Anthony's Church, Surakarta, Indonesia
- St. Barbara's Church, Sawahlunto, Indonesia
- St. Joseph's Church, Semarang, Indonesia
- St. Leo's Chapel, Padang, Indonesia
- St. Fransiskus Chapel, Semarang, Indonesia (Located at Ordo St. Fransiskus (OSF) Cloister)
- St. Mary the Virgin Church, Bogor, Indonesia
- Regina Pacis Chapel, Bogor, Indonesia
- Gedung Bergamin, Padang, Indonesia
- Sacred Heart of Jesus Church, Malang, Indonesia (Locally known as Gereja Kayutangan)
- Sayidan Church, Yogyakarta, Indonesia

== Ireland ==
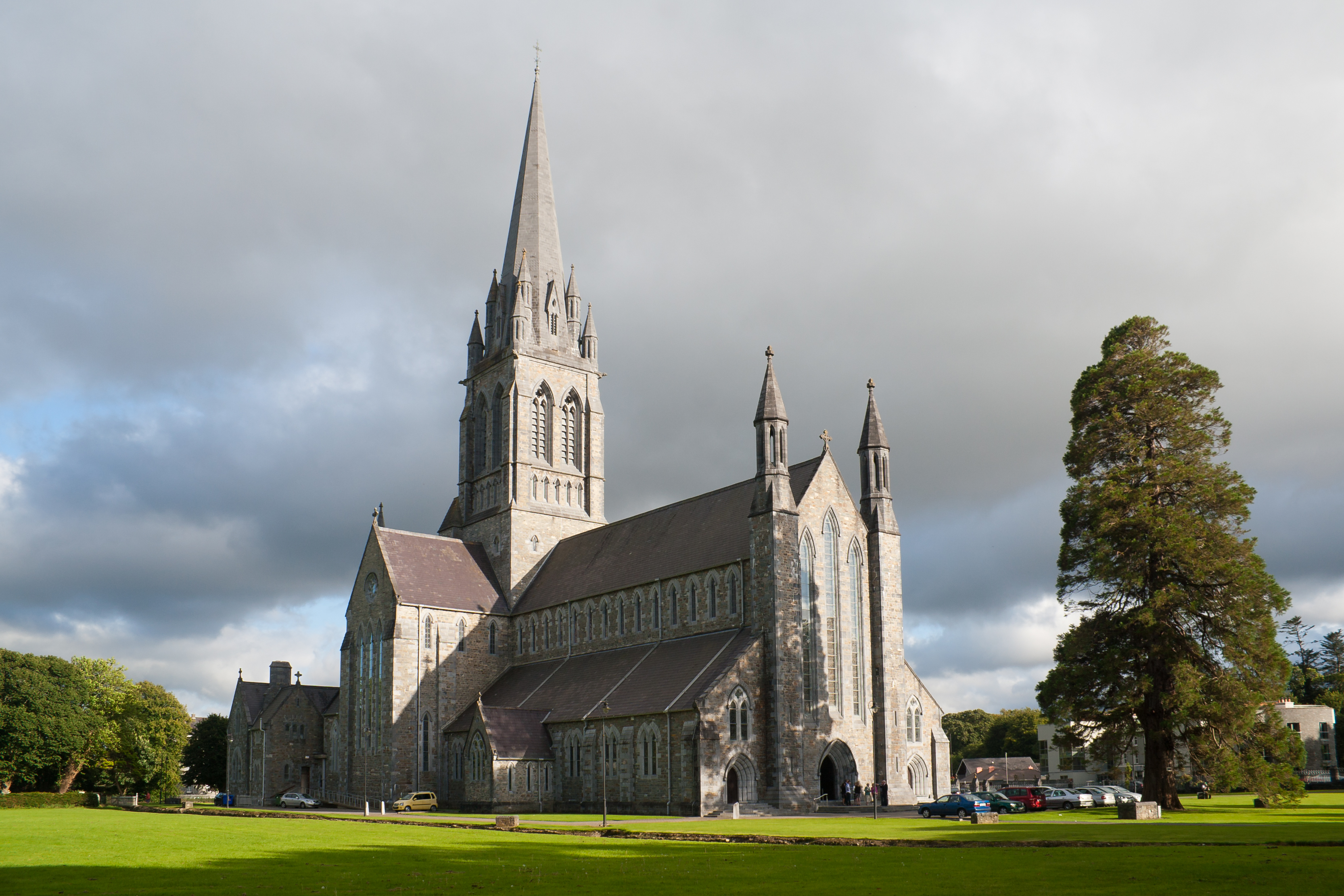
- St. Mary's Cathedral, Kilkenny
  St John's Cathedral, County Limerick, 1861
- St. Eunan's Cathedral, Letterkenny, County Donegal, 1890-1900
- Saint Finbarre's Cathedral, Cork, 1870
- Saints Peter and Paul's Church, Cork, 1866
- St Mary's Cathedral, Killarney, County Kerry, 1842–55
- St. Aidan's Cathedral, Enniscorthy, County Wexford, 1843
- St Mary's Cathedral, Tuam, County Galway, 1878
- St. Mary's Cathedral, Kilkenny, County, Kilkenny, 1857

== Italy ==
=== Liguria ===
- Castello d'Albertis, Genoa.
- Chiesa di San Teodoro, Genoa, 1870
- chiesa protestante di Genova, Genoa.
- chiesa anglicana All Saints Church, Bordighera, in the Province of Imperia.
- chiesa di Santo Spirito e Concezione, Zinola/Savona, 1873

=== Piedmont ===
- Castello di Pollenzo, Brà (near Cuneo), Piedmont.
- Chiesa di Santa Rita, Turin, early 20th century.
- Borgo Medioevale, Turin.
- Tempio Valdese, Turin, 1851–53

=== Veneto ===
- Caffè Pedrocchi (or Pedrocchino), Padua, mixed parts of gothic and classical styles.
- Molino Stucky, Venice.
- chiesa di San Giovanni Battista, San Fior, in the Province of Treviso, 1906–1930
- Palazzetto Stern, Venice.
- Villa Herriot, Venice.
- Casa dei Tre Oci, Venice.

=== Trieste ===
- Chiesa Evangelico Luterana, Trieste, 1871–74
- Notre Dame de Sion, Trieste, 1900

=== Tuscany ===
- Florence Cathedral, the facade only.
- Chiesa del Sacro Cuore (Livorno), Livorno (Leghorn), 1915
- Palazzo Aldobrandeschi, Grosseto, 1903
- chiesa Valdese, Florence.
- chiesa Episcopale Americana di Saint James, Florence, early 20th century.
- Tempio della Congregazione Olandese Alemanna, Livorno, 1862–1864

=== Lazio ===
- Chiesa di Santa Maria del Rosario in Prati, Rome, 1912–16
- Church of Sacro Cuore del Suffragio, Rome, 1917
- chiesa del Sacro Cuore, Grottaferrata, in the Province of Rome, 1918–1928
- Chiesa Anglicana Episcopale di San Paolo entro le Mura, Rome
- Chiesa di Ognissanti (chiesa anglicana di Roma), Rome, 1882

=== Molise ===
- Santuario dell'Addolorata, Castelpetroso, 1890–1975

=== Campania ===
- Chiesa di Santa Maria stella del mare, Naples, early 20th century.
- Castello Aselmeyer, Naples.
- Anglican Church of Naples, Naples, 1861–1865
- Chiesa Luterana, Naples, 1864

=== Sardinia ===
- City Hall (Cagliari), Cagliari, 1899

=== Sicily ===
- Chiesa di Santa Maria della Guardia, Catania, 1880
- Chiesa Anglicana di Palermo, Palermo, 1875

== Japan ==
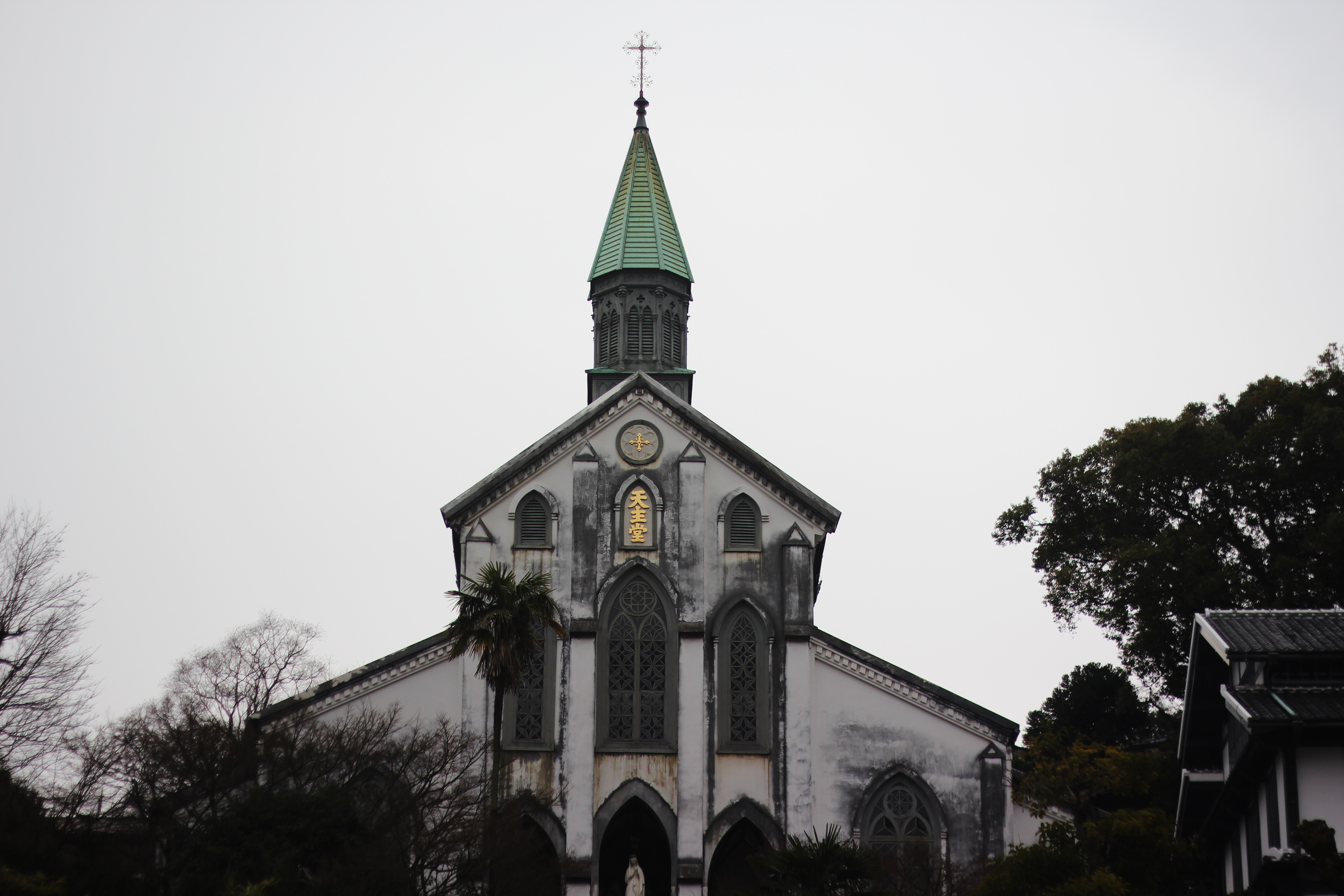
- Ōura Church, Nagasaki
  Ōura Church, Nagasaki

== Korea ==
- Cathedral Church of the Virgin Mary of the Immaculate Conception, Myeongdong
- Chunghyeon Church, Seoul

== Lithuania ==
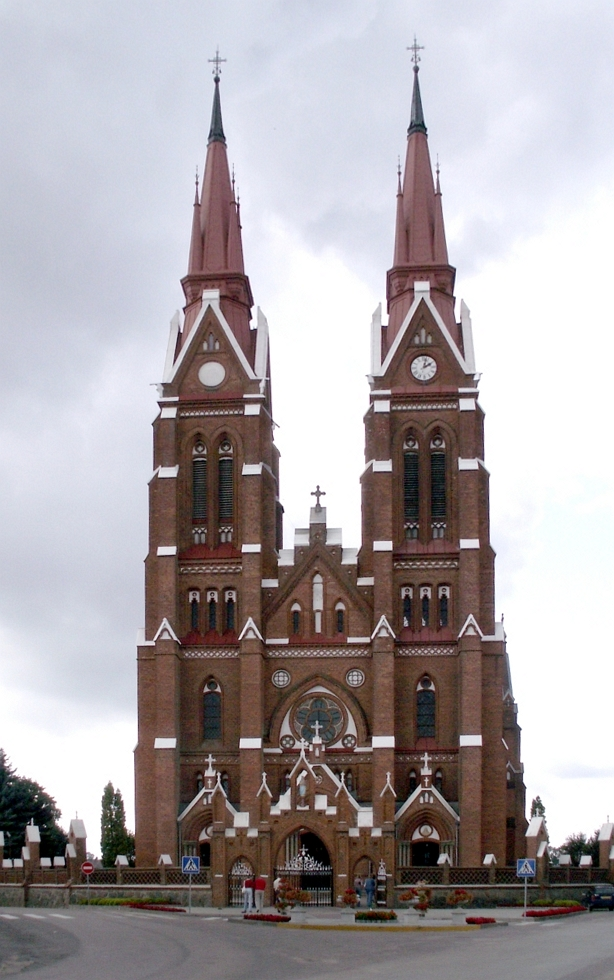
Church of St. James the Apostle, Švėkšna

- Beržėnai Manor
- Belltower of the Church of St. Anne in Vilnius
- Chapel in Rasos Cemetery
- Church of the Ascension of Christ in Kupiškis
- Church of the Assumption of the Virgin Mary in Palanga
- Church of the Assumption of the Blessed Virgin Mary in Salantai
- Church of the Birth of the Blessed Virgin Mary in Nemunaitis
- Church of the Blessed Virgin Mary of the Scapular in Druskininkai
- Church of St. Anne in Akmenė
- Church of St. Anthony of Padua in Birštonas
- Church of St. Casimir in Kamajai
- Church of St. James the Apostle in Švėkšna
- Church of St. John the Baptist in Ramygala
- Church of St. Joseph in Karvis
- Church of St. George in Vilkija
- Church of the Name of Blessed Virgin Mary in Sasnava
- Church of the Holy Trinity in Gruzdžiai
- Church of the Holy Trinity in Jurbarkas
- Church of the Holy Trinity in Pabiržė
- Church of the Holy Trinity in Tverečius
- Church of St. Matthias in Rokiškis
- Church of St. Matthew the Apostle in Anykščiai
- Church of St. Stanislaus the Bishop in Kazitiškis
- Evangelical Lutheran Church in Juodkrantė
- Evangelical Lutheran Church in Nida
- Evangelical Lutheran Church in Šilutė
- Lentvaris Manor
- Paliesiai Manor
- Raduškevičius Palace
- Raudone Castle
- Tyszkiewicz family Mausoleum and Chapel in Kretinga

== Malaysia ==
- St Michael's Institution, Ipoh, Malaysia
- St. Xavier Church, Malacca, Malaysia
- Holy Rosary Church, Kuala Lumpur, Malaysia

== Mexico ==
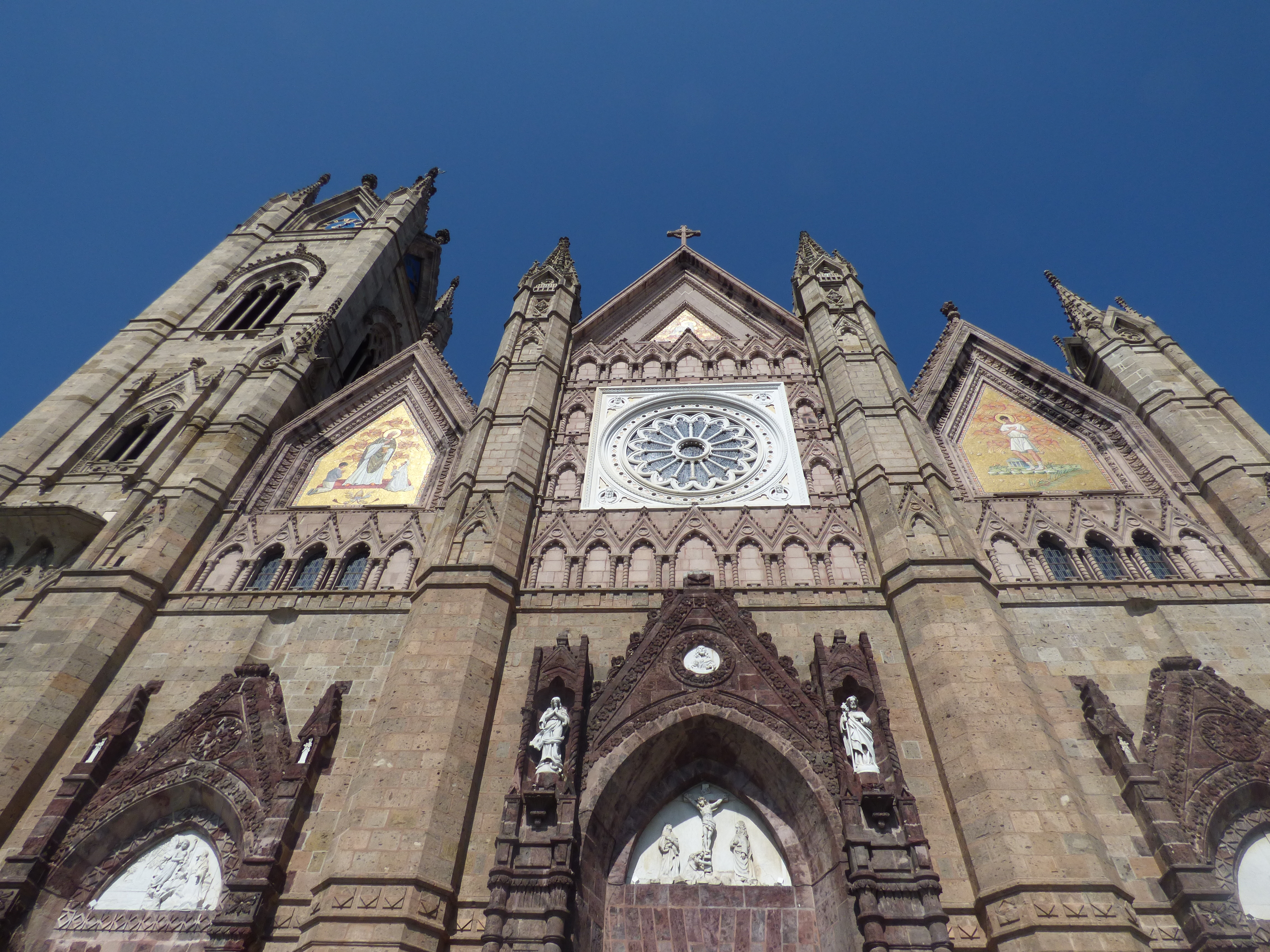
- Templo Expiatorio del Santísimo Sacramento, Jalisco
  Chapultepec Castle, Mexico City
- Cathedral of Our Lady of Guadalupe, Zamora, Michoacán
- Mexico City Metropolitan Cathedral
- Palacio de Correos de Mexico
- La Parroquia Church of St. Michael the Archangel, San Miguel de Allende
- Templo Expiatorio del Santísimo Sacramento, Jalisco
- Templo Expiatorio del Sagrado Corazón de Jesús, León, Guanajuato
- Parroquia de San Jose Obrero, Arandas Jalisco
- Xalapa Cathedral, Xalapa, Veracruz

== Myanmar ==
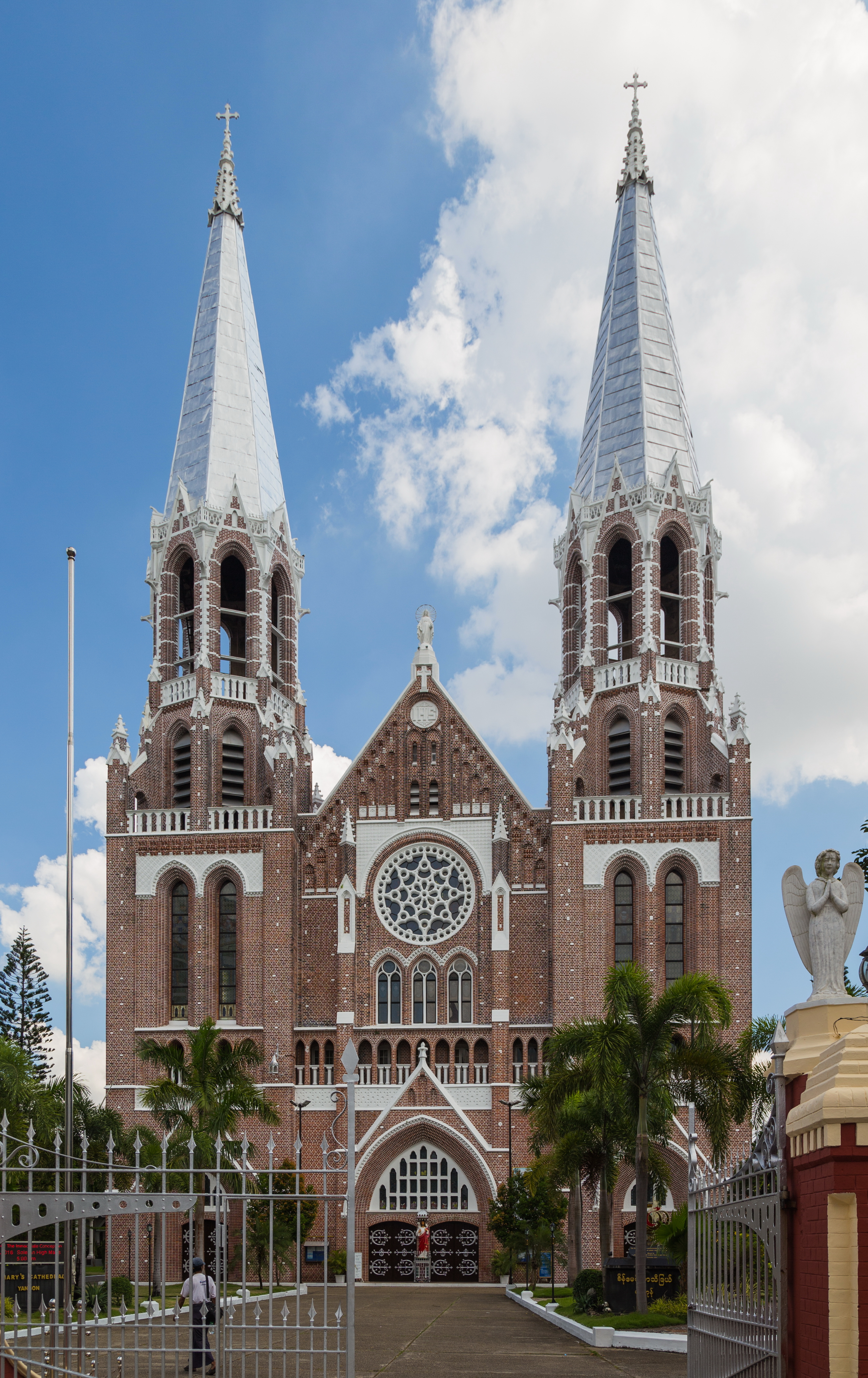
- St. Mary Cathedral, Yangon
  St. Mary Cathedral, Yangon, Myanmar
- Holy Trinity Cathedral, Yangon, Myanmar
- St. Joseph Church, Mandalay, Myanmar

== Netherlands ==
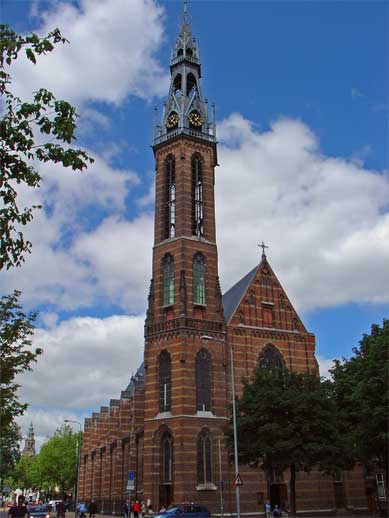
St. Joseph Cathedral, Groningen, Groningen, The Netherlands

- City Hall of Tilburg, Tilburg
- Heuvelse kerk, Tilburg
- Valkenburg railway station, Valkenburg
- Saint Boniface church, Leeuwarden, Leeuwarden
- St. Joseph Cathedral, Groningen, Groningen
- De Krijtberg, Amsterdam
- St. Willibrord's Church, Utrecht, Utrecht
- Saint Paul's Church, Vaals, Vaals
- De Haar Castle, Utrecht

== New Zealand ==
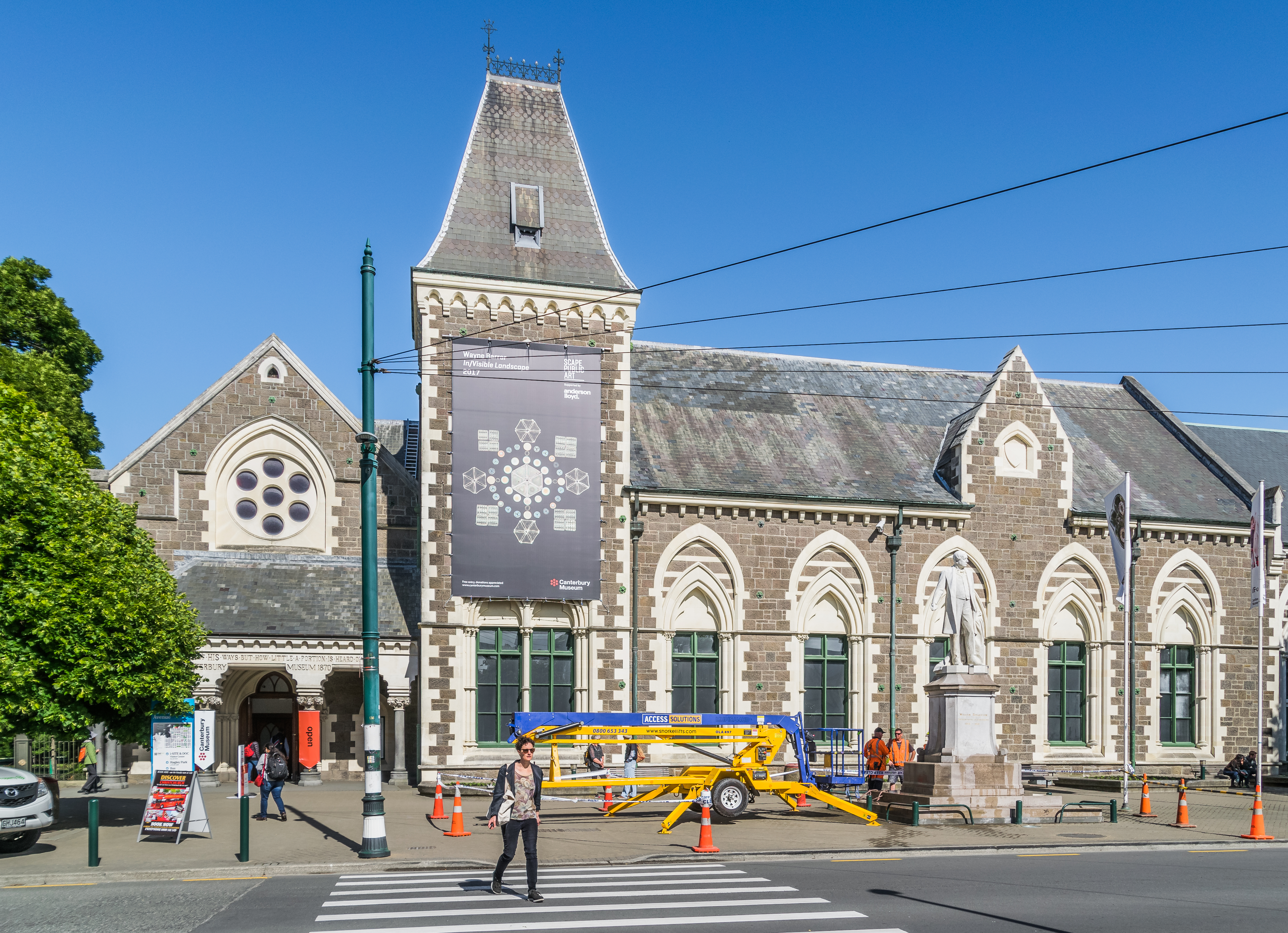
- Canterbury Museum, Christchurch
  Canterbury Museum, Christchurch. (Benjamin Mountfort architect)
- Christchurch Arts Centre, Christchurch (Mountfort)
- Christchurch Cathedral, Christchurch (George Gilbert Scott and Mountfort)
- Canterbury Provincial Council Buildings, Christchurch (Mountfort)
- Christ's College, Christchurch, Christchurch
- Victoria Clock Tower, Christchurch (Mountfort)
- Dunedin Town Hall, Dunedin, 1878–1880. (Robert Lawson)
- First Church, Dunedin 1867–1873. (Lawson)
- Knox Church, Dunedin 1874-1876.(Lawson)
- Larnach Castle, Dunedin, 1867–1887. (Lawson)
- Old St. Paul's, Wellington (Frederick Thatcher)
- St. Joseph's Cathedral, Dunedin, 1879-1886.(Francis Petre)
- Otago Boys' High School, Dunedin 1883–1885. (Lawson)
- Seacliff Lunatic Asylum, Dunedin, 1884–1887. (Lawson)
- University of Otago Clocktower complex, Dunedin, 1878–1922. (Maxwell Bury)
- University of Otago Registry Building, Dunedin, 1879–1922. (Bury)
- Lyttelton Timeball Station, Lyttelton. (Thomas Cane)

== Nigeria ==
- Cathedral Church of Christ, Lagos, 1946
- Holy Cross Cathedral, Lagos, 1939

== Norway ==
- Oscarshall, Oslo, 1847–1852
- Sagene Church, Oslo, 1891
- Tromsø Cathedral, in wood, Tromsø, Norway, 1861

== Pakistan ==
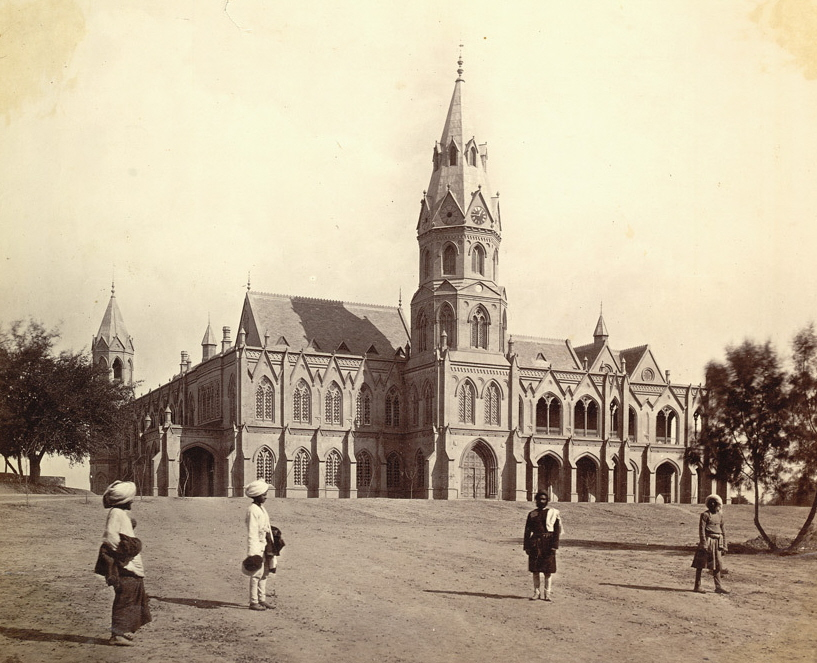
- Government College University, Lahore
  Government College University, Lahore, Pakistan
- Cathedral Church of the Resurrection, Lahore, Pakistan
- St. Patrick Cathedral, Karachi, Pakistan
- St Andrew's Church, Karachi, Pakistan

== Philippines ==
- San Sebastian Church, Manila, 1891
- St. Anne's Parish Church / Molo Church, Iloilo, 1795
- Montserrat Abbey San Beda University, Manila, 1926
- Archdiocesan Shrine of Espiritu Santo, Santa Cruz, Manila, 1932
- Ellinwood Malate Church, Malate, Manila, 1936
- Manila Central United Methodist Church, Ermita, Manila, 1937
- Iglesia ni Cristo Lokal ng Washington, Sampaloc, Manila, 1948
- Knox United Methodist Church, Santa Cruz, Manila, 1953

== Poland ==
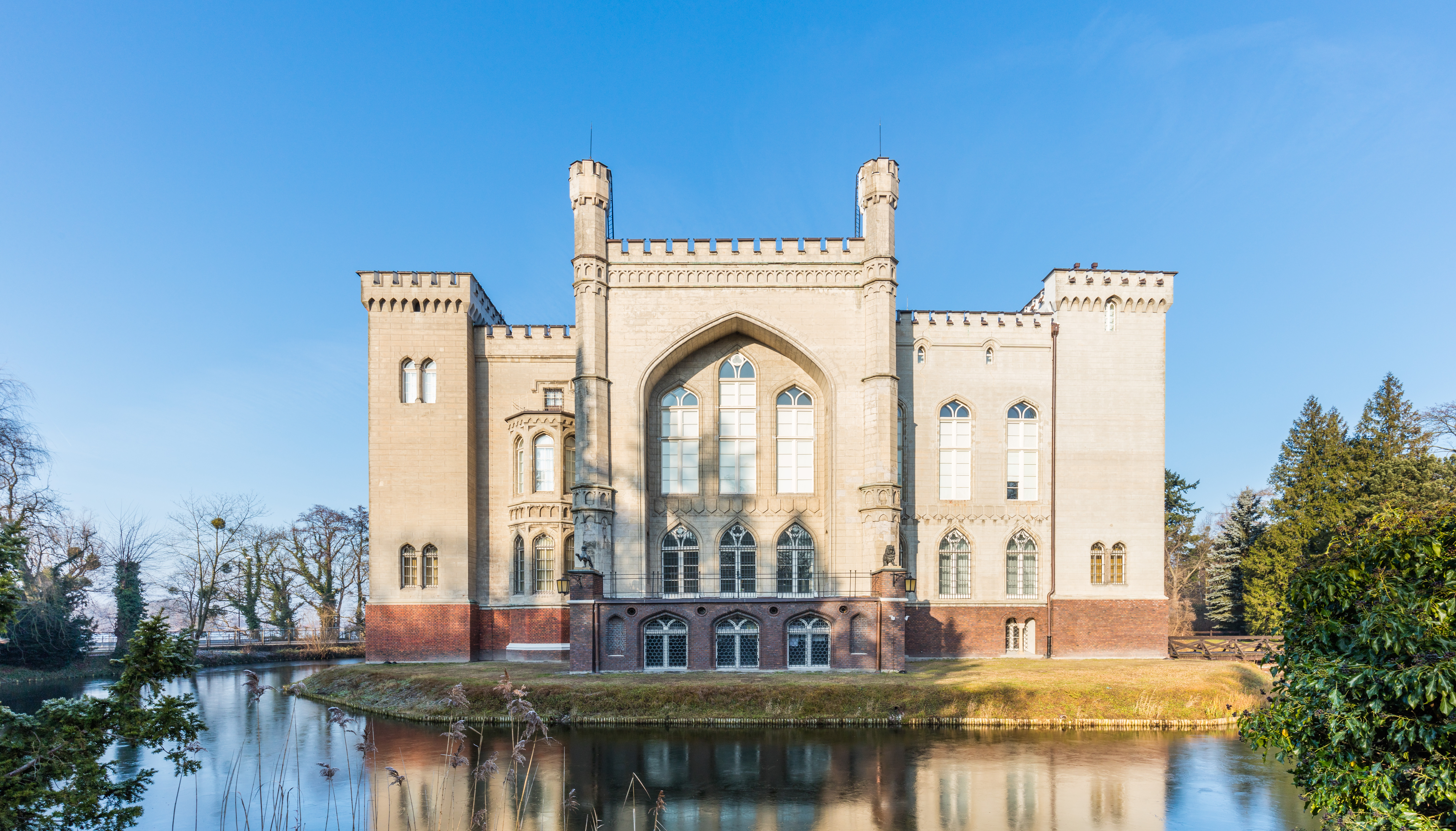
- Kórnik Castle
  Gothic House in Puławy, 1800–1809
- Potocki mausoleum located at the Wilanów Palace, 1823–1826
- Lublin Castle, 1824–1826
- Krasiński Palace in Opinogóra Górna, 1828–1843
- Kórnik Castle, 1843–1861
- Blessed Bronisława Chapel in Kraków, 1856–1861
- Collegium Novum of the Jagiellonian University in Kraków, 1873–1887
- Karl Scheibler's Chapel in Łódź, 1885–1888
- Cathedral in Siedlce, 1906–1912
- Temple of Mercy and Charity in Płock, 1911–1914

== Romania ==
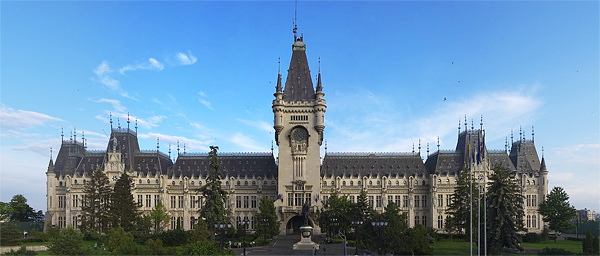
- Palace of Culture (Iași)
  Palace of Culture, Iași, 1906–1925
- Iași railway station, 1870
- Sturdza Palace, Miclăușeni, Iași County, 1880–1904
- Caru' cu Bere, Bucharest, 1898–1899
- Crețulescu Palace, Bucharest, 1902–1904
- Dormition of the Theotokos Church, Sighetu Marmației, 1890–1892
- Elisabetin Roman Catholic Church, Timișoara, 1912–1919
- Elisabetin Reformed Church, Timișoara, 1901–1902
- Saint John's Church, Sibiu, 1911–1912
- St. Nicholas Church, Brăila, 1860–1865
- Tocile Church, Brașov, 1824–1825

== Russia ==
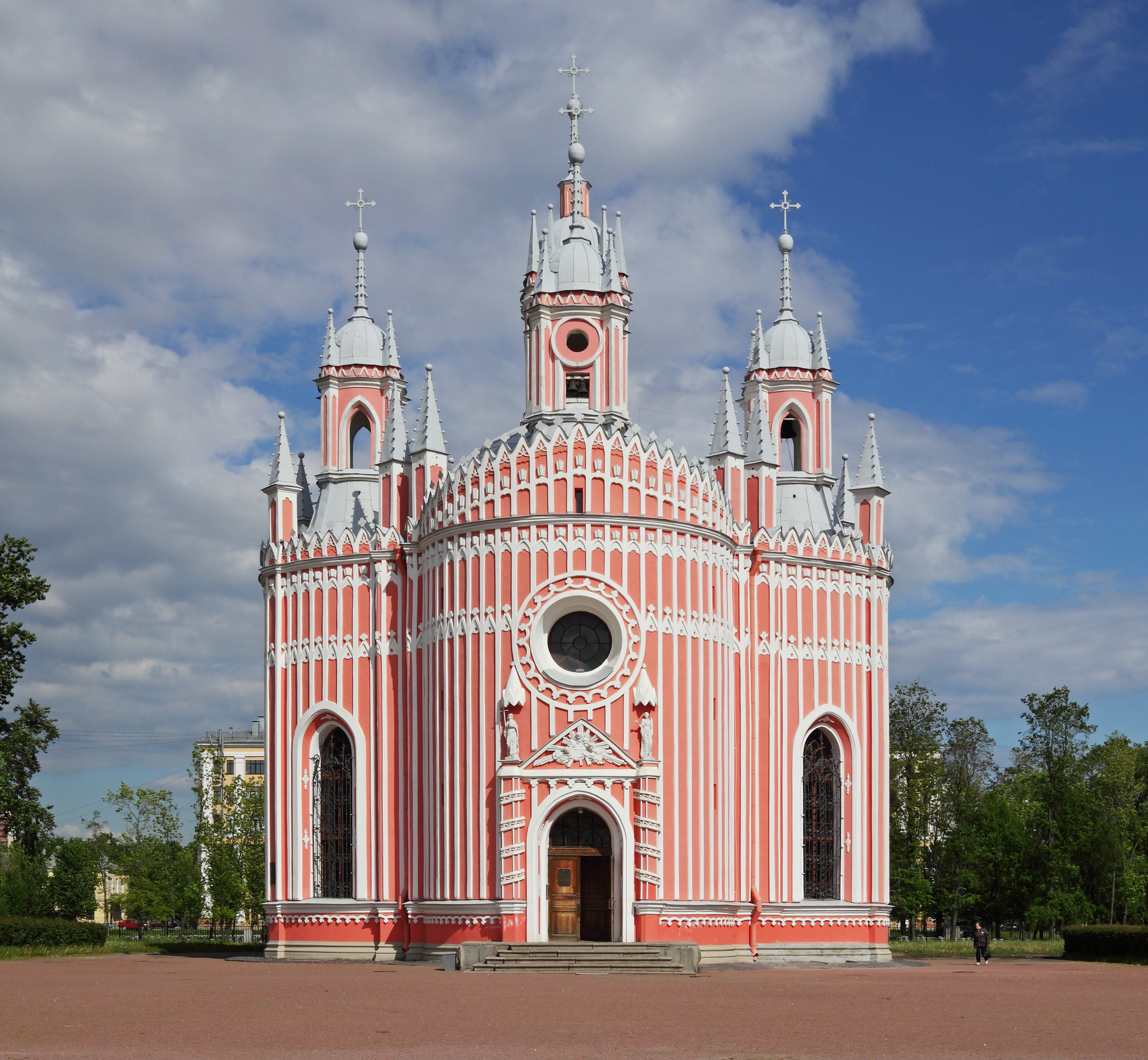
Chesme Church, Saint Petersburg

- Gothic Chapel, Peterhof, 1834
- Chesme Church, Saint Petersburg, 1780
- Tsaritsyno Palace, Moscow, 1775
- Nikolskaya tower of Moscow Kremlin, Moscow, 1806
- St. Mary Cathedral, Moscow
- St. Andrew's Anglican Church, Moscow, 1884
- Sacred Heart Church, Samara, 1902
- TsUM, Moscow

== Serbia ==
- Name of Mary Church, Novi Sad, 1892

== Singapore ==
- St Andrew's Cathedral on North Bridge Road, Singapore
- Church of the Nativity of the Blessed Virgin Mary on Serangoon, Singapore

== Slovakia ==
- Cathedral of St. Elizabeth, Košice, 1863 (current form)
- Neogothic chapel, Mošovce

== South Africa ==
- Burgersdorp Reformed Church, Burgersdorp
- Central Methodist Church, Cape Town, 1879
- Dordrecht Reformed Church, Dordrecht
- Dutch Reformed Church, Barkly East
- Dutch Reformed Church, Barrydale
- Dutch Reformed Church, Bredasdorp
- Dutch Reformed Church, Robertson
- Dutch Reformed Church, Rondebosch
- Dutch Reformed Church, Rustenburg
- Dutch Reformed Church, Swartland
- Dutch Reformed Church, Tarkastad
- Dutch Reformed Church, Vryheid
- Gqeberha Main library, Gqeberha (Formerly Port Elizabeth Main library)
- Groote Kerk, Graff Reinet
- Moederkerk, Stellenbosch
- Sandstone Church, Nieuwoudtville, 1907
- St. Albans Cathedral, Pretoria
- St Cyprian's Cathedral, Kimberley, 1908
- St. George's Cathedral, Cape Town, 1901
- St. Marks Anglican Cathedral, George
- St Mary's Cathedral, Gqeberha
- St. Michael and St. George Cathedral, Grahamstown, 1952
- St. Patrick's Cathedral, Kokstad, 1935

== Spain ==
- Astorga Episcopal Palace, Astorga
- Facade and spire of Cathedral of Santa Eulalia, Barcelona
- Temple Expiatori del Sagrat Cor, on Tibidabo hill, Barcelona
- Gothic Quarter, Barcelona
- Butrón Castle
- Sobrellano Palace, Comillas
- Casa de los Botines, León
- Cathedral of San Cristóbal de La Laguna, San Cristóbal de La Laguna
- Anglican Cathedral of the Redeemer, Madrid
- All Saints' Church, Puerto de la Cruz
- San Sebastián Cathedral
- Cathedral of María Inmaculada of Vitoria

== Sweden ==
=== Neo gothic buildings erected during 19th or 20th century ===
- St. John's Church, Stockholm
- St. Peter and St. Sigfrids Anglican Church, Stockholm
- Gustavus Adolphus Church, Stockholm
- Oscar Church, Stockholm
- St. George's Greek orthodox cathedral, Stockholm
- Nacka Church, Nacka, Stockholm
- Gustavsberg Church, Gustavsberg, Stockholm
- Taxinge Church, Taxinge
- Matthew's Church, Norrköping
- Oscar Fredrik's Church, Gothenburg
- Örgryte new Church, Gothenburg
- St. John Church, Gothenburg
- St. Andrew's Anglican Church, Gothenburg
- Gustavus Adolphus's Church, Borås
- Trollhättan Church, Trollhättan
- Smögen Church, Smögen
- Lysekil Church, Lysekil
- Rudbeck school, Örebro
- Olaus Petri Church, Örebro
- Åtvid new Church, Åtvidaberg
- Kristinehamn Church, Kristinehamn
- Luleå cathedral, Luleå
- Umeå city Church, Umeå
- Gustavus Adolphus's Church, Sundsvall
- Oviken new Church, Oviken
- Church of all saints, Lund
- the University Library, Lund
- Cathedral School, Lund
- Norra Nöbbelöv Church, Lund
- Eslöv Church, Eslöv
- Svedala Church, Svedala
- Billinge Church, Billinge
- Källstorp Church, Källstorp
- Asmundtorp Church, Asmundtorp
- Nosaby Church, Nosaby
- Österlöv Church, Österlöv
- Östra Klagstorp Church, Östra Klagstorp
- Sofia Church, Jönköping
- Arlöv Church, Arlöv, Malmö
- Bunkeflo Church, Bunkeflo, Malmö
- Limhamn Church, Limhamn, Malmö
- Gustavus Adolphus's Church, Helsingborg
- Helsingborg court house, Helsingborg
- Gossläroverket (Grammar School for boys), Helsingborg

=== Medieval and other buildings influenced by neo gothic renovation ===
- St. Nicolai Church, Trelleborg
- Floda Church, Flodafors
- Uppsala cathedral, Uppsala
- Skara Cathedral, Skara
- Linköping Cathedral, Linköping
- St. Nicholas Church, Örebro
- Klara Church, Stockholm
- Riddarholmen Church, Stockholm
- Malmö court house, Malmö

== Tanzania ==
- St. Joseph's Cathedral, Dar es Salaam

== Ukraine ==
- St. Nicholas Roman Catholic Church, Kyiv
- National Bank of Ukraine, building, Kyiv
- Cathedral of the Assumption of the Blessed Virgin Mary, Kharkiv
- Church of Sts. Olha and Elizabeth, Lviv

== United Kingdom ==
=== England ===
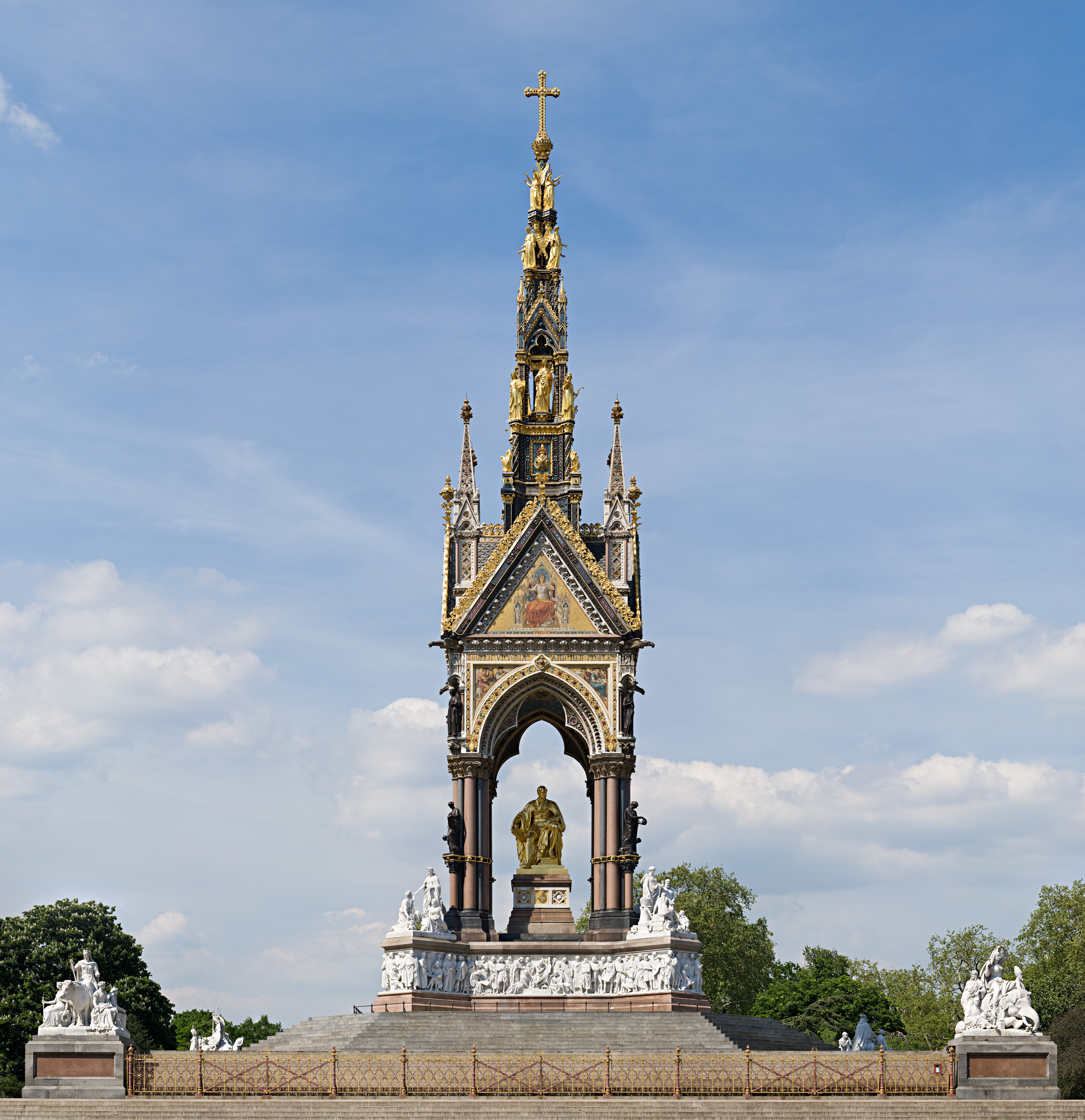
Albert Memorial, London

- Albert Memorial, London, 1872
- All Saints' Church, Daresbury, Cheshire, 1870s, the tower is medieval
- All Saints Church, Leamington Spa, Warwickshire, 1843
- All Saints Church, Margaret Street, London
- Bristol Cathedral, Bristol, the nave and west front
- Broadway Theatre, Catford, London, 1928–32
- Charterhouse School, Godalming, Surrey
- Church of St Mary the Virgin, Reculver, Kent, 1876–78
- Downside Abbey, Somerset, c.1882–1925
- 33-35 Eastcheap, City of London, 1868
- Fonthill Abbey, Wiltshire, 1795–1813 (no longer survives)
- Guildford Cathedral, Guildford
- John Rylands Library, Manchester, 1890–1900
- Keble College, Oxford, 1870

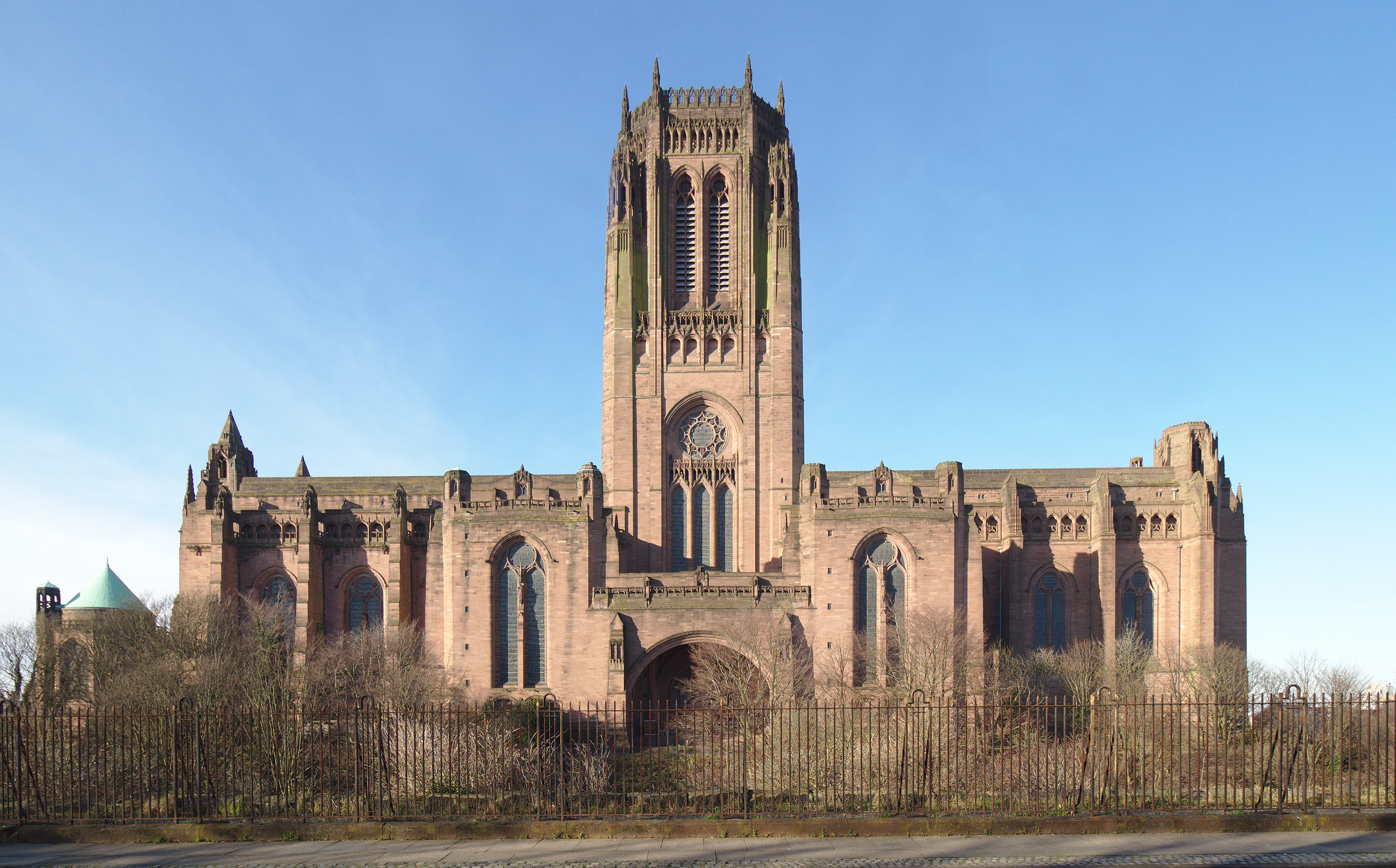
Liverpool Cathedral, Liverpool

- Liverpool Cathedral, Liverpool
- Manchester Town Hall, Manchester, 1877
- The Maughan Library, City of London, 1851–1858
- Northampton Guildhall
- Palace of Westminster (Houses of Parliament), London, begun in 1840
- Royal Chapel of All Saints, Windsor Great Park, Berkshire, remodelled in 1866
- Royal Courts of Justice, London
- St. Chad's Cathedral, Birmingham
- St James the Less, Pimlico, London
- St Oswald's Church, Backford, Cheshire, the nave 1870s, the tower and chancel are medieval
- St Walburge's Church, Preston

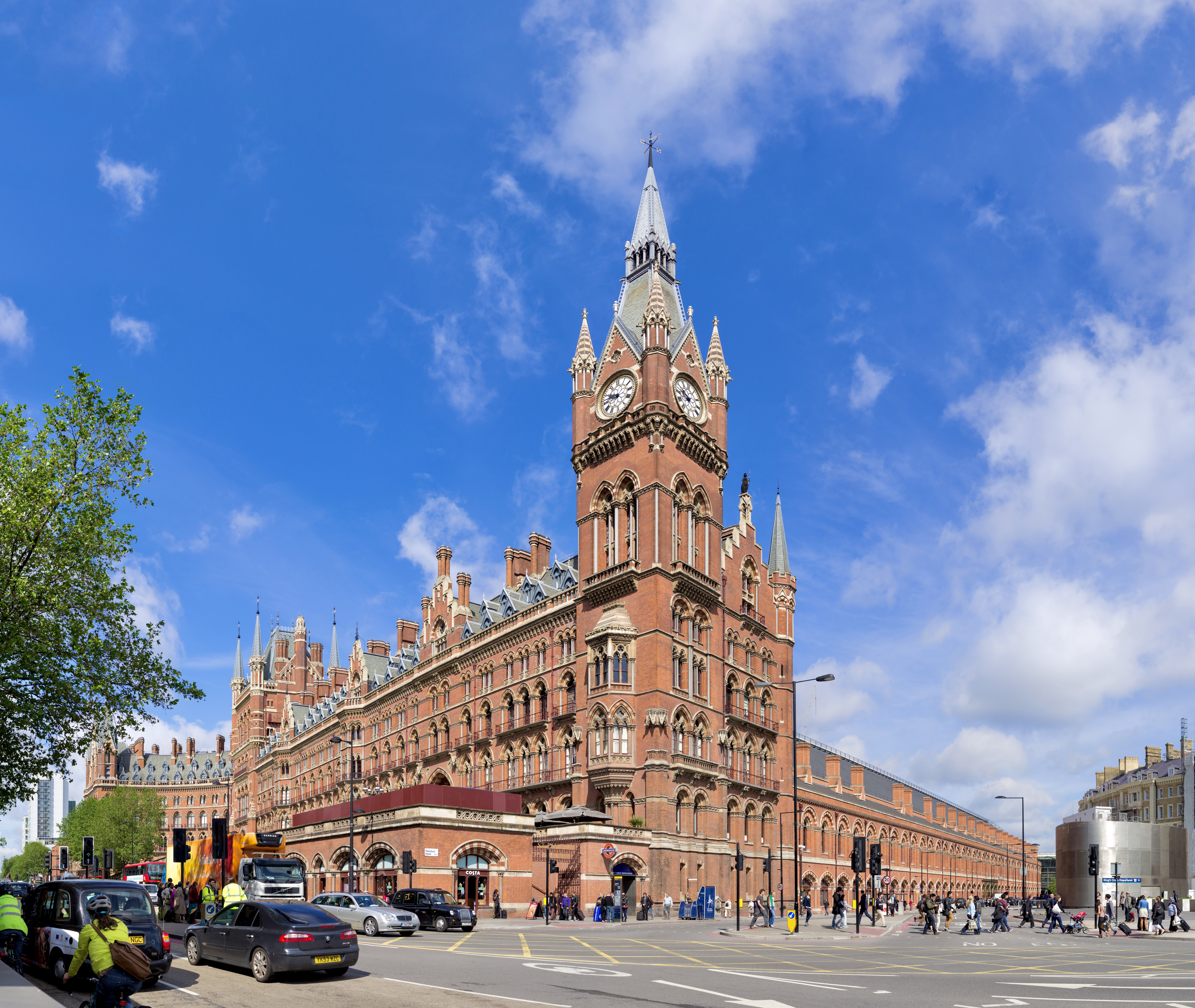
St Pancras railway station, London

- St Pancras railway station, London, 1868
- South London Theatre, London
- Tower Bridge, London
- Truro Cathedral, Cornwall
- Tyntesfield, Somerset, 1863
- Southwark Cathedral, Southwark, London, the nave
- Strawberry Hill, London, begun in 1749
- Oxford University Museum of Natural History, Oxford
- Woodchester Mansion, Gloucestershire, c.1858–1873
- Wills Memorial Building at the University of Bristol, Bristol, 1915–1925
- St John's Church, Warminster

=== Northern Ireland ===
- Down Cathedral, 1818
- St Mark's Church, Dundela, 1878

=== Scotland ===
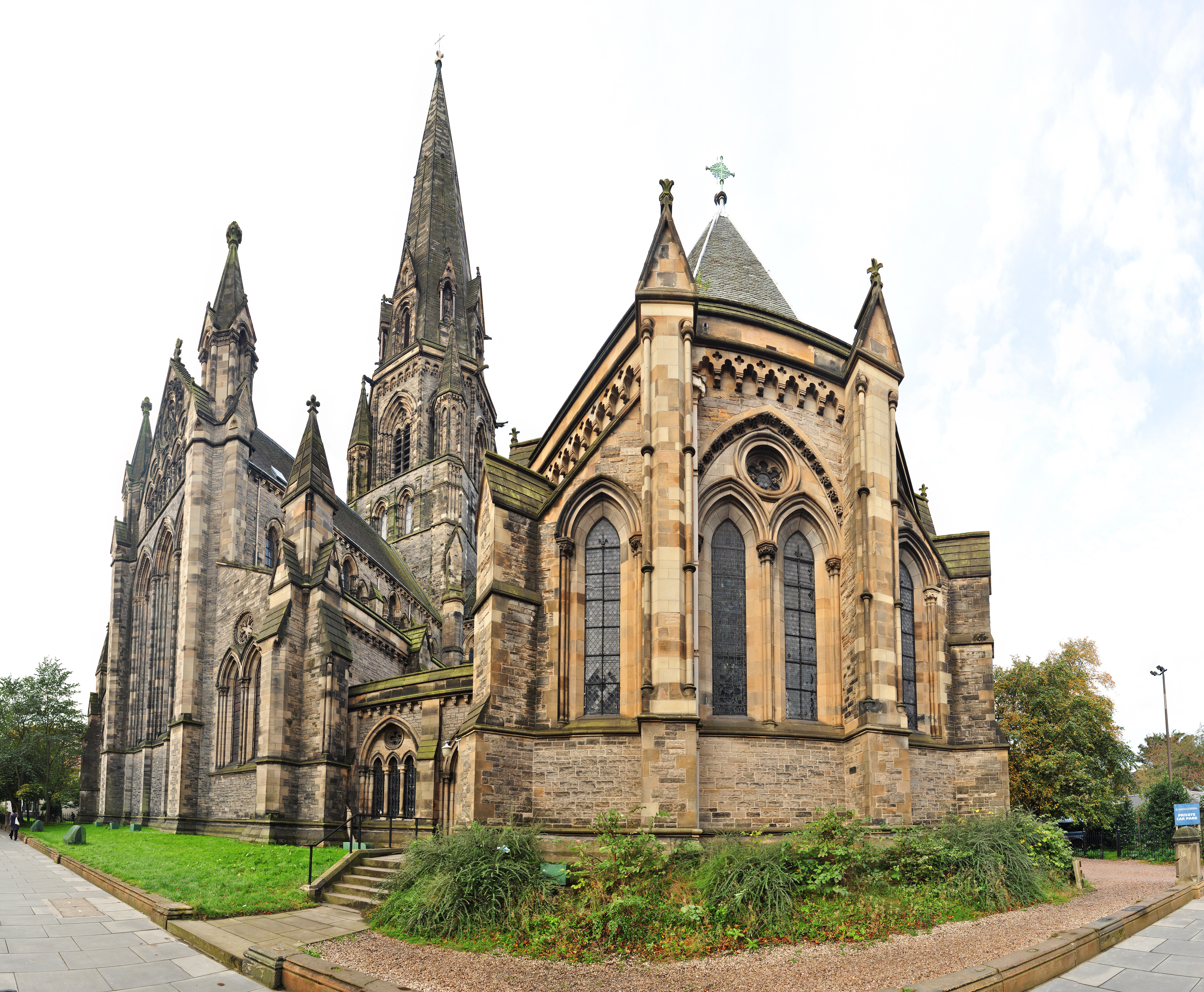
St Mary's Cathedral, Edinburgh

- Barclay Church, Edinburgh, Scotland, 1862–1864
- St Mary's Cathedral, Edinburgh (Episcopal), from 1874
- Scott Monument, Edinburgh, Scotland, begun in 1841
- Gilbert Scott Building, University of Glasgow campus, Glasgow, Scotland, (the second largest example of Gothic Revival architecture in the British Isles), 1870
- Kelvinside Hillhead Parish Church, Observatory Road/Huntly Gardens, West End, Glasgow. Opened 1876. Based on the famous Sainte Chapelle, Paris
- Wallace Monument

=== Wales ===
- Hawarden Castle (18th century), Hawarden
- Gwrych Castle, Abergele, 1819
- Penrhyn Castle, Gwynedd, 1820–45
- Cyfarthfa Castle, Merthyr Tydfil, 1824
- Margam Castle, Margam, Port Talbot, 1830–5
- Treberfydd, near Brecon, 1847−50
- Bodelwyddan Castle, Bodelwyddan, Denbighshire, 1850s, with further alterations in the 1880s
- Hafodunos, near Llangernyw, 1861–6
- Cardiff Castle, Glamorgan, 1866–9
- Castell Coch, Glamorgan, 1871

== United States ==
=== Alabama ===
- Lanier High School Lanier High School (Montgomery, Alabama), Montgomery, Alabama

=== California ===
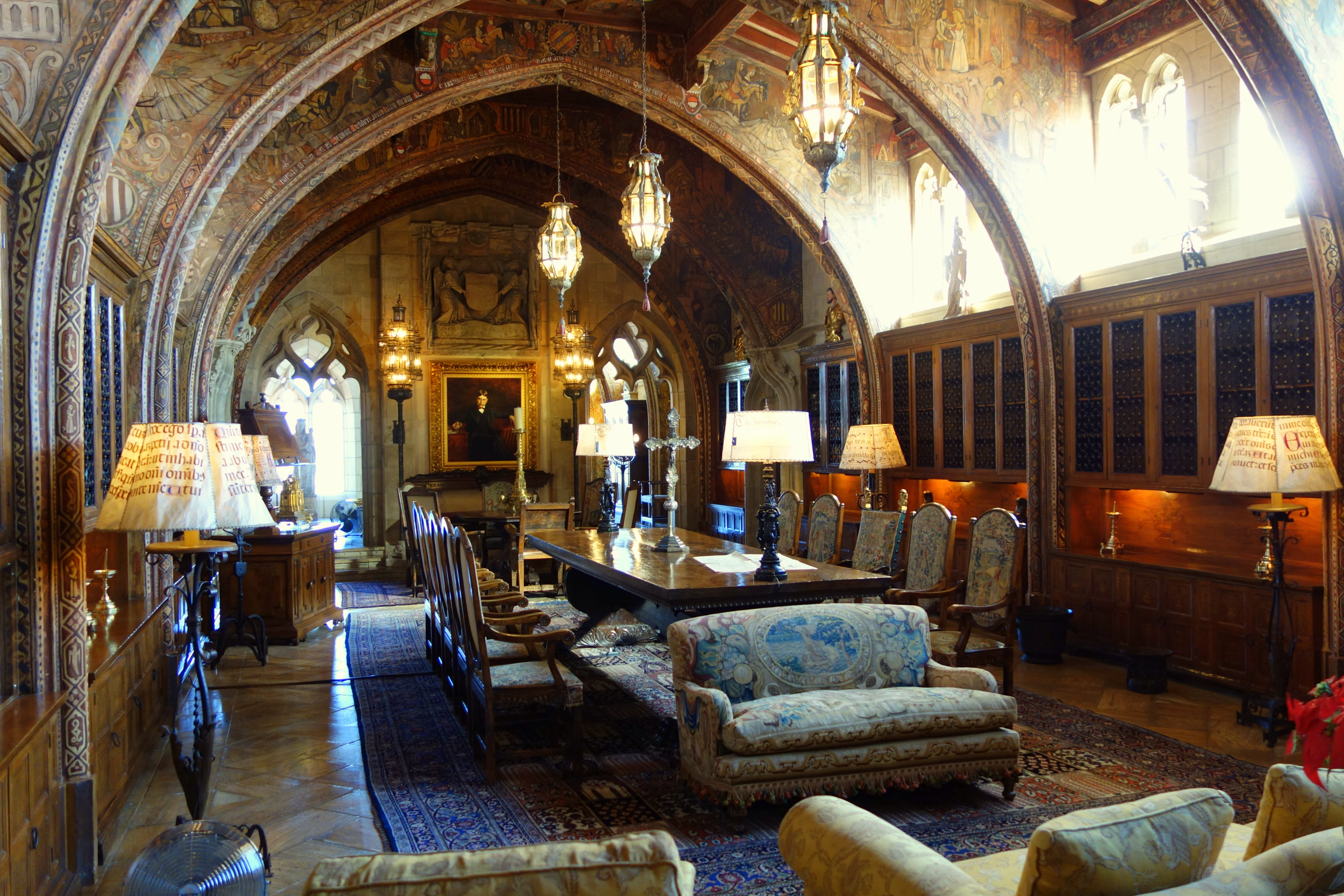
Gothic interior of Hearst Castle

- Interior of Hearst Castle, San Simeon, California
- Cathedral Building, Oakland, California, 1914
- Grace Cathedral, San Francisco, 1928–1964.
- St. Dominic's Roman Catholic Church, San Francisco, 1928
- All Saints Episcopal Church (Pasadena, California), church 1926, rectory 1931.
- First Congregational Church of Los Angeles, Los Angeles, California, 1931

=== Colorado ===
- Cathedral of St. John in the Wilderness, Denver, 1909–11

=== Connecticut ===
- Yale University, New Haven, Connecticut
  - Harkness Tower, 1917–21
  - Hall of Graduate Studies, Yale Law School
  - Payne Whitney Gymnasium
  - Residential colleges

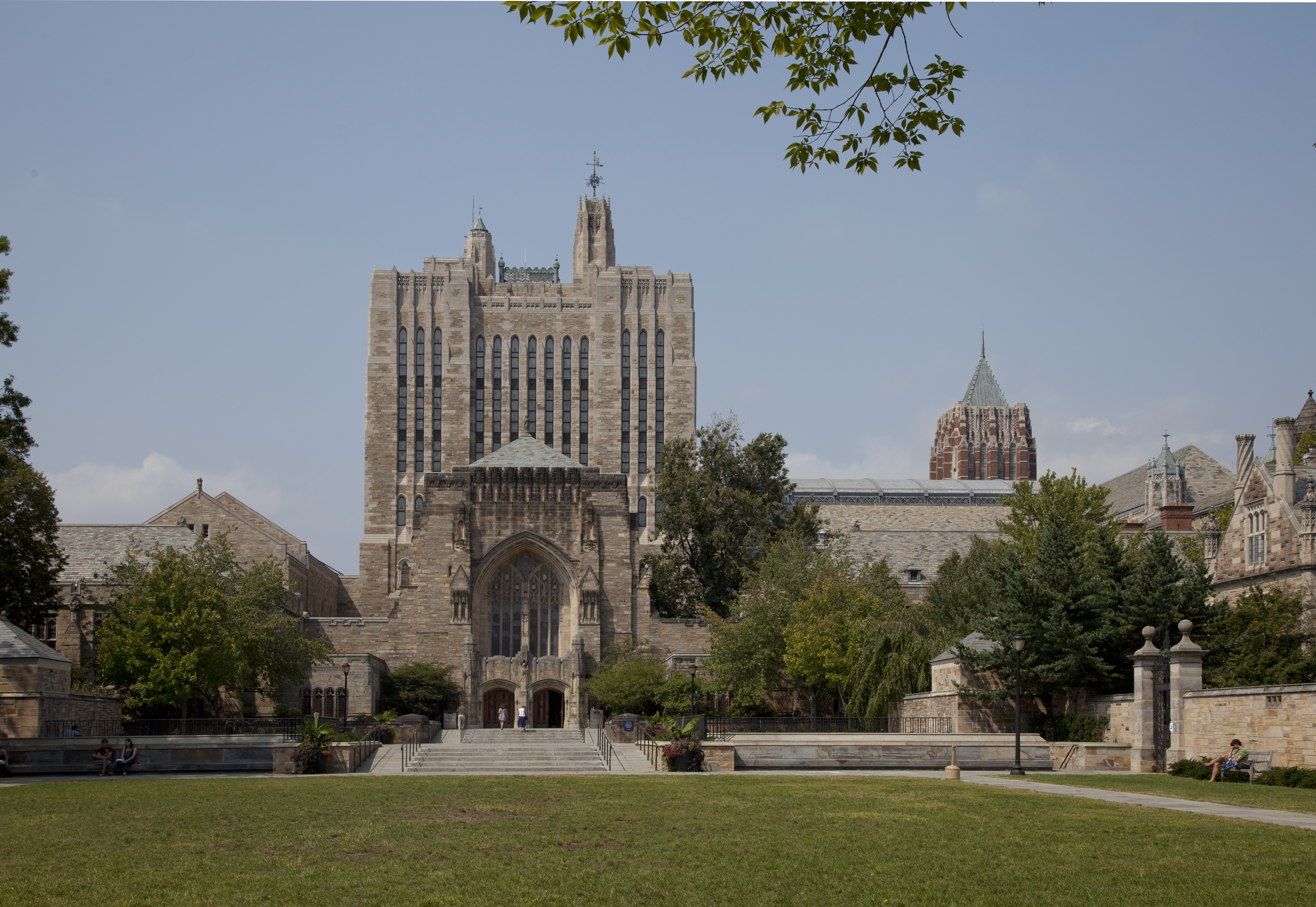
Sterling Memorial Library

  - Sterling Memorial Library

=== Florida ===
- The titular tower of Bok Tower Gardens
- Several buildings on the University of Florida campus, Gainesville, Florida

=== Georgia ===
- Congregation Mickve Israel, Savannah, Georgia, 1876–78. A rare example of a Gothic revival synagogue.

=== Illinois ===
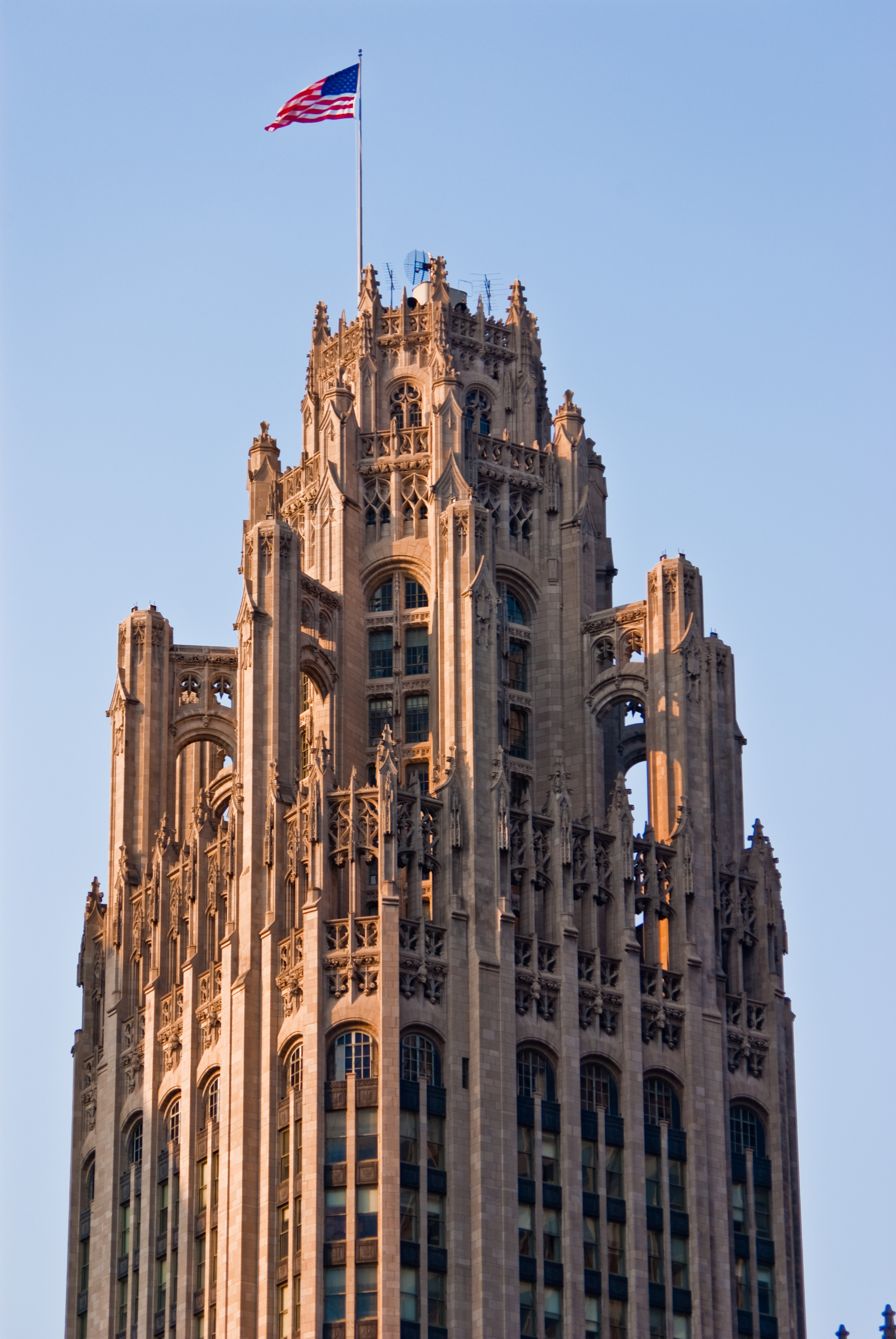
- Tribune Tower
  Tribune Tower, Chicago, Illinois, completed in 1925
- University of Chicago
  - Rockefeller Chapel
  - other campus buildings

=== Indiana ===
- Basilica of the Sacred Heart, Notre Dame, Indiana, 1882
- St. Michael the Archangel Church, Madison, Indiana, 1839

=== Louisiana ===
- Christ Church Cathedral, New Orleans, New Orleans, Louisiana, 1886.
- Old Louisiana State Capitol, Baton Rouge, Louisiana, 1849.
- St. Patrick's Church (New Orleans, Louisiana), New Orleans, Louisiana, 1837.

=== Maryland ===
- The Baltimore City College (public high school), Baltimore, Maryland, founded 1839, erected 1926–1928, third oldest public high school in America, nicknamed "The Castle on the Hill", at 33rd Street and The Alameda.

=== Massachusetts ===
- Boston College, Boston, Massachusetts
  - Bapst Library, 1908
  - Gasson Tower

=== Michigan ===
- Cathedral Church of St. Paul (Detroit), 1907–08
- Woodward Avenue Presbyterian Church, Detroit, Michigan, 1911

=== Mississippi ===
- St. Mary's Episcopal Chapel in Adams County, Mississippi, 1837

=== Missouri ===
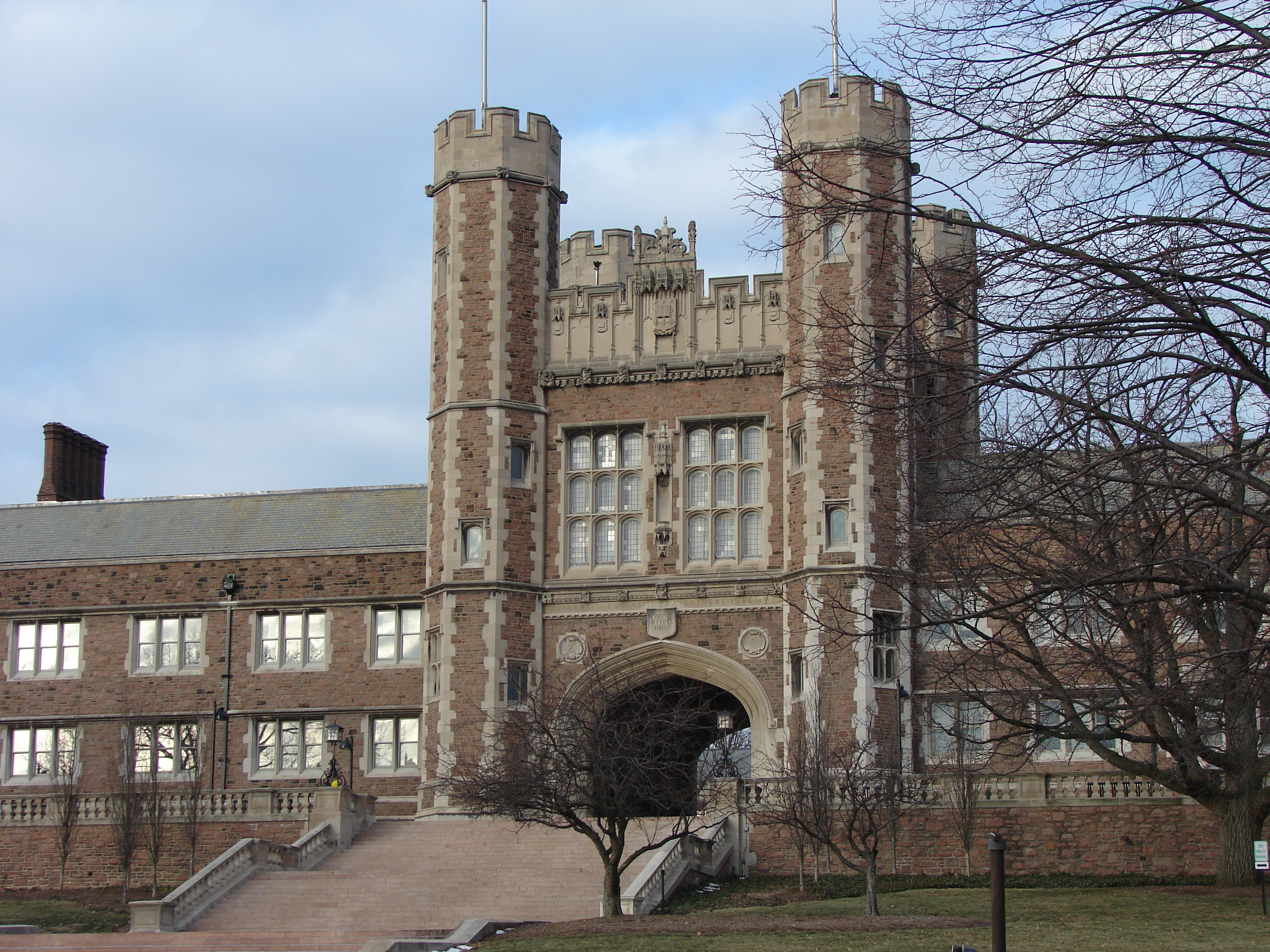
- Brookings Hall
  Brookings Hall and several buildings on the Washington University in St. Louis campus
- St. Francis de Sales Church (St. Louis, Missouri), the second largest church in the Roman Catholic Archdiocese of St. Louis

=== New Jersey ===
- Cathedral Basilica of the Sacred Heart (Newark, New Jersey) 1954
- Princeton University, Princeton, New Jersey
  - Princeton University Chapel, 1925–1928
  - Princeton University Graduate College
  - Whitman College House
- Several buildings on the Seton Hall University campus, South Orange, New Jersey
- The Willows at Fosterfields, the Morristown mansion built for Joseph Warren Revere, 1854

=== New York ===
- Fonthill Castle and the Administration Building of the College of Mount St. Vincent, the Bronx, 1852 and 1859
- American Museum of Natural History, Manhattan, 1877
- Saint Ignatius of Antioch Episcopal Church, Manhattan, 1902
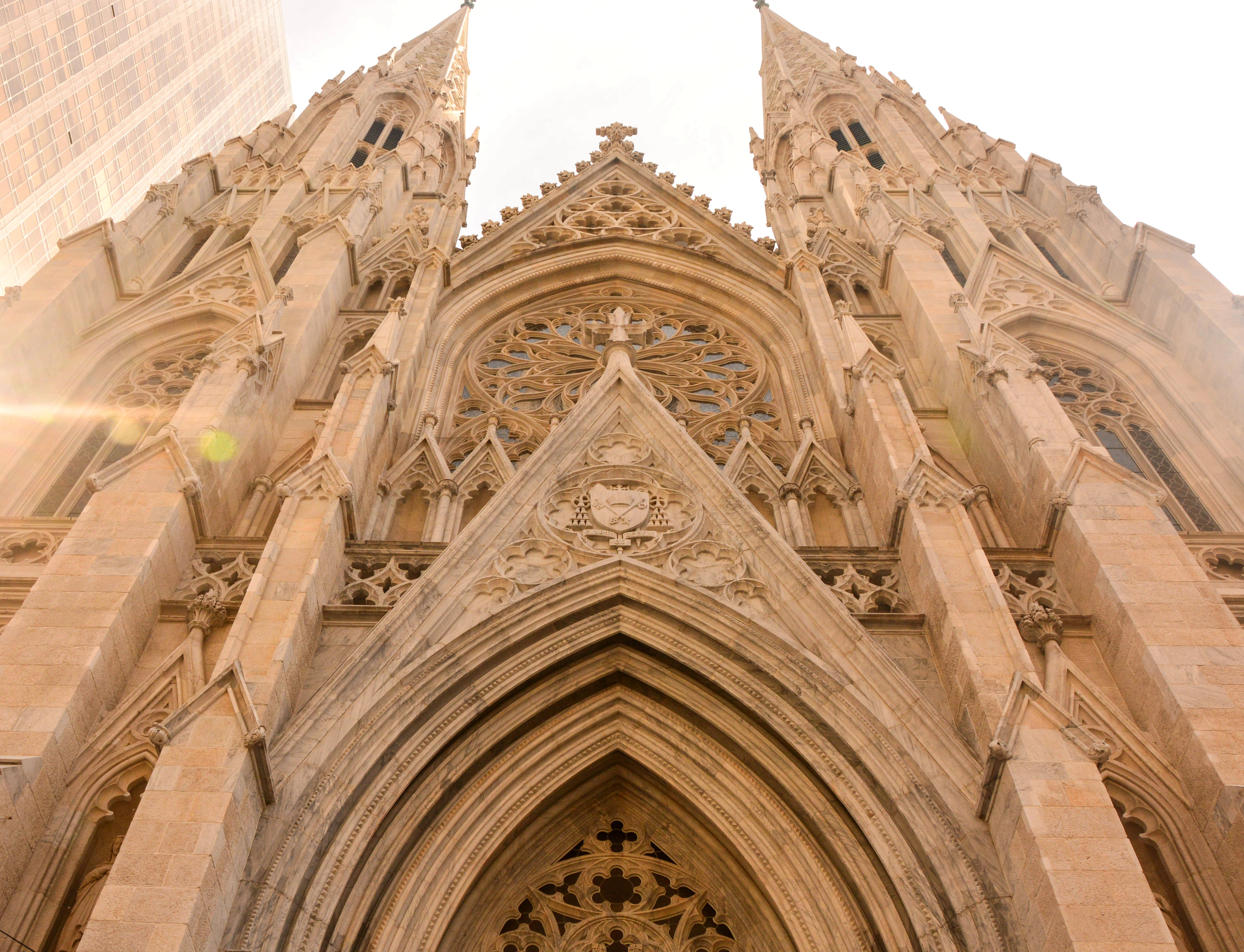
- St. Patrick's Cathedral, Manhattan
  St. Patrick's Cathedral, Manhattan, 1858–78
- Woolworth Building, Manhattan, 1910–13
- Trinity and United States Realty Buildings, Manhattan, 1907
- New York Life Insurance Building, Manhattan, 1928
- Liberty Tower, Manhattan, 1909
- Public School 166 in Manhattan, New York City, 1898
- McGraw Tower, Uris Library, Willard Straight Hall, and other buildings on the Cornell University campus in Ithaca, New York.
- Several buildings of the Fordham University campus, the Bronx, including structures as recently constructed as 2000.
- The Thompson Memorial Library at Vassar College in Poughkeepsie, NY, 1905.
- Several buildings on the City College of New York campus, Manhattan
- Most of the buildings on the West Point campus, most famously the West Point Cadet Chapel
- The Oliver Brewster House in Cornwall, New York

=== North Carolina ===
- Duke Chapel and the main quadrangle of the West Campus of Duke University, Durham, North Carolina, 1930–35
- High Point Central High School, (High Point, North Carolina)

=== Ohio ===
- Several buildings on the University of Toledo campus, Toledo, Ohio
- St. John's Episcopal Church (Cleveland, Ohio) 1836, the oldest consecrated building in Cuyahoga County, Ohio
- Trinity Cathedral, Cleveland
- Forest Lawn Memorial Park Youngstown, Ohio
- Jones Hall at Youngstown State University, Youngstown, Ohio
- Saint John's Episcopal Church, Youngstown, Ohio

=== Oklahoma ===
- Mid-Continent Tower, Tulsa, Oklahoma, 1918

=== Pennsylvania ===
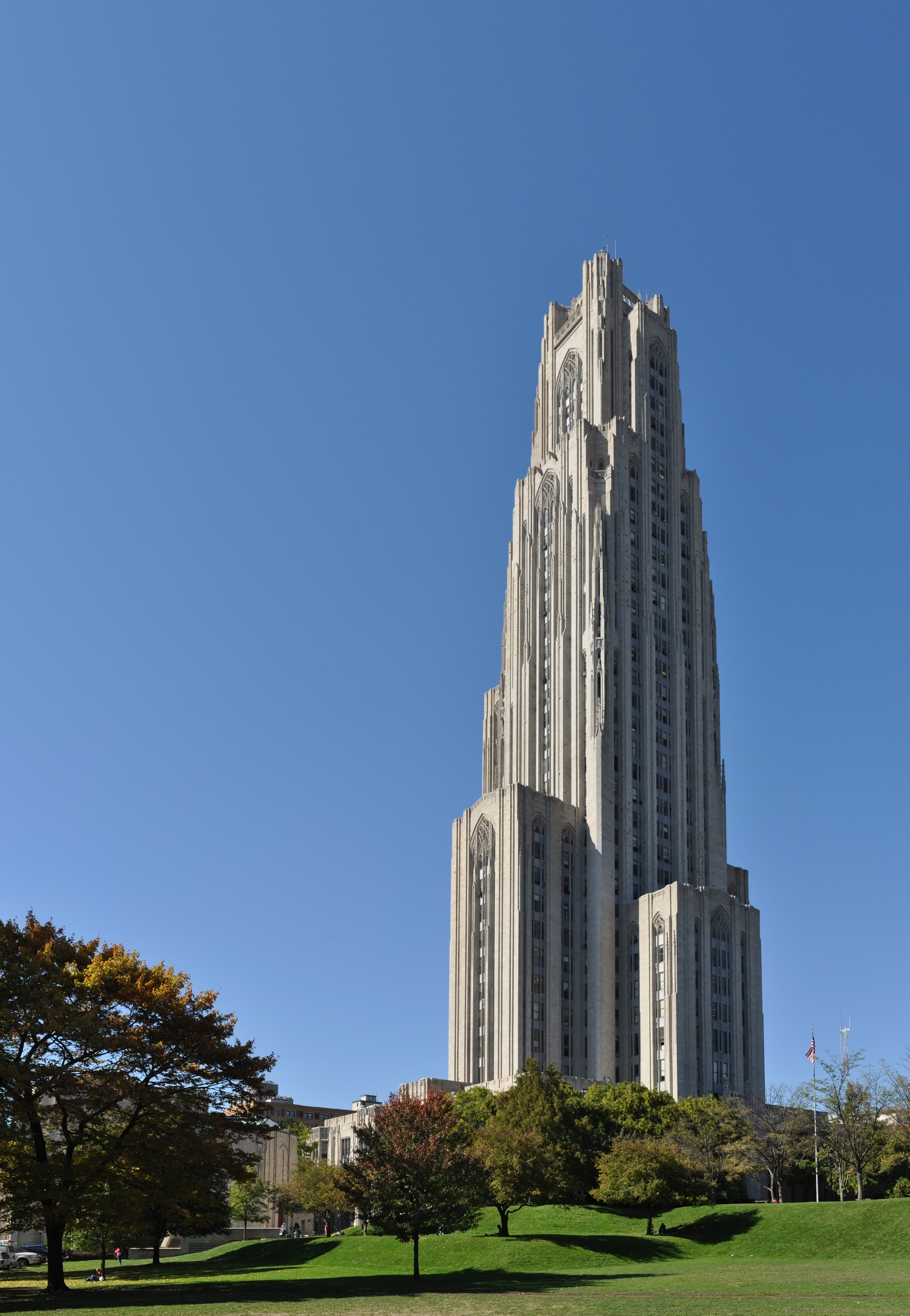
Cathedral of Learning

- Alumni Memorial Building, Lehigh University, Bethlehem, 1925
- Bryn Athyn Cathedral, Bryn Athyn, 1913–19
- Several buildings on the Bryn Mawr College campus, Bryn Mawr
- Church of the Advocate, Philadelphia, 1892–97
- Church of the Good Shepherd (Rosemont, Pennsylvania), 1893–94
- East Liberty Presbyterian Church, Pittsburgh, 1932–35
- Several buildings on the Grove City College campus, Grove City, Pennsylvania
- PPG Place, Pittsburgh, Pennsylvania, 1984
- Saint Peter's Episcopal Church, Pittsburgh, Pennsylvania. Built 1851, moved and re-constructed 1901, destroyed (date needed)
- University of Pennsylvania, Philadelphia
  - College Hall, 1872
  - Houston Hall, 1894–96, 1936
  - Irvine Auditorium, 1926–29
  - Quadrangle Dormitories, 1895–1912, 1920s, 1950s
- University of Pittsburgh, Pittsburgh
  - Cathedral of Learning, 1926–37
  - Heinz Chapel, 1933–38
  - Stephen Foster Memorial, 1935–37
  - Clapp Hall, 1956

=== Tennessee ===
- Several buildings on the Rhodes College campus, Memphis, Tennessee
- St. Mary's Episcopal Cathedral in Memphis, Tennessee, 1898–1926

=== Texas ===
- St. Patrick Cathedral, Fort Worth, Texas, 1888
- Tower Life Building, San Antonio, Texas, 1929

=== Utah ===
- Salt Lake Temple, Salt Lake City, Utah, 1896

=== Virginia ===
- St. Paul's Episcopal Church (Alexandria, Virginia), 1818, designed by Benjamin Latrobe
- Several buildings on the University of Richmond campus, Richmond, Virginia, 1937

=== Washington ===
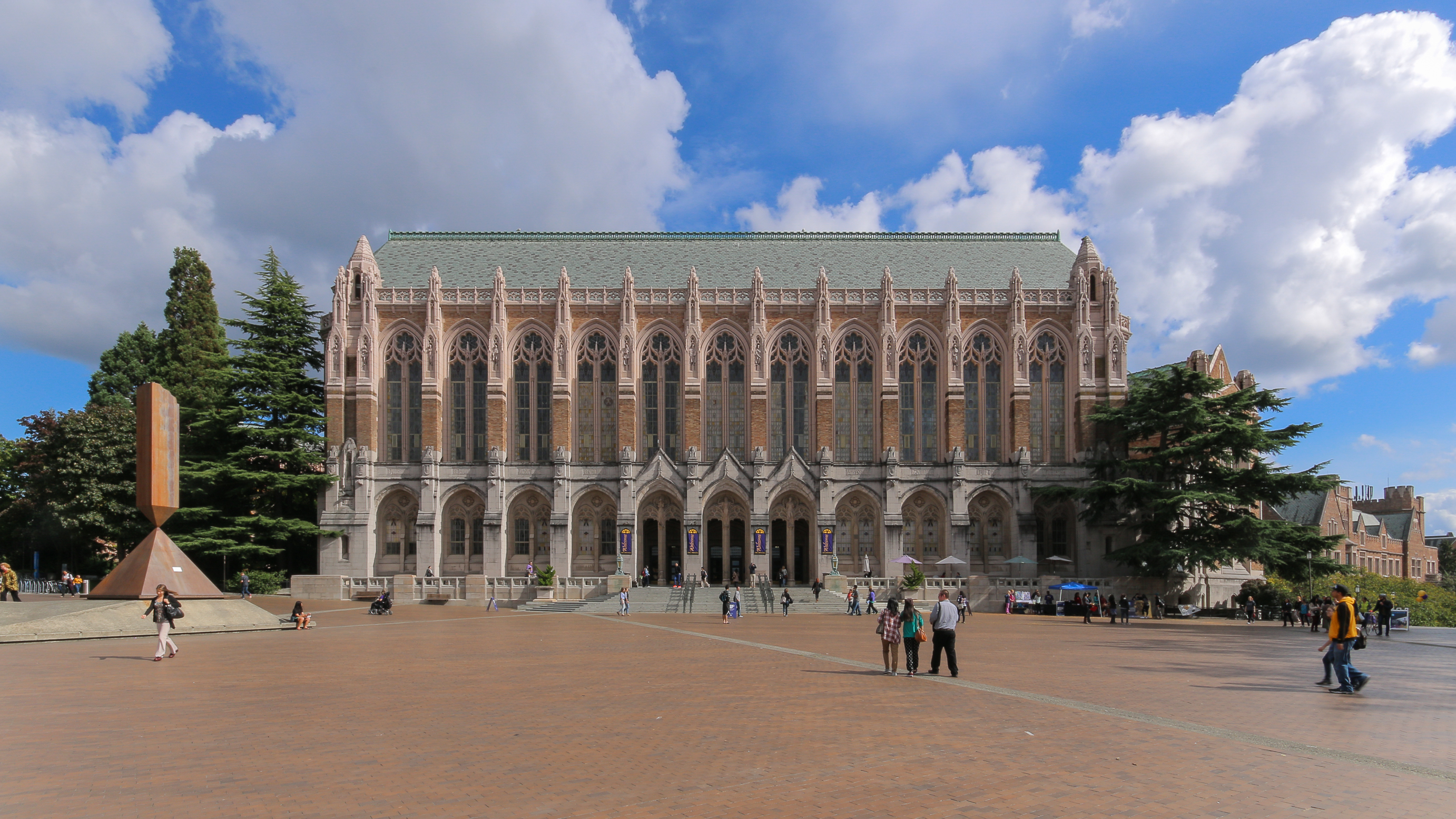
- Suzzallo Library
  Suzzallo Library and several buildings on the University of Washington campus, Seattle, Washington

=== Washington, D.C. ===
- Oak Hill Cemetery Chapel, Washington, D.C., designed by James Renwick Jr. in 1850
- Washington National Cathedral, Washington, D.C., 1907–90

=== Wyoming ===
- Natrona County High School, Casper, Wyoming, 1924

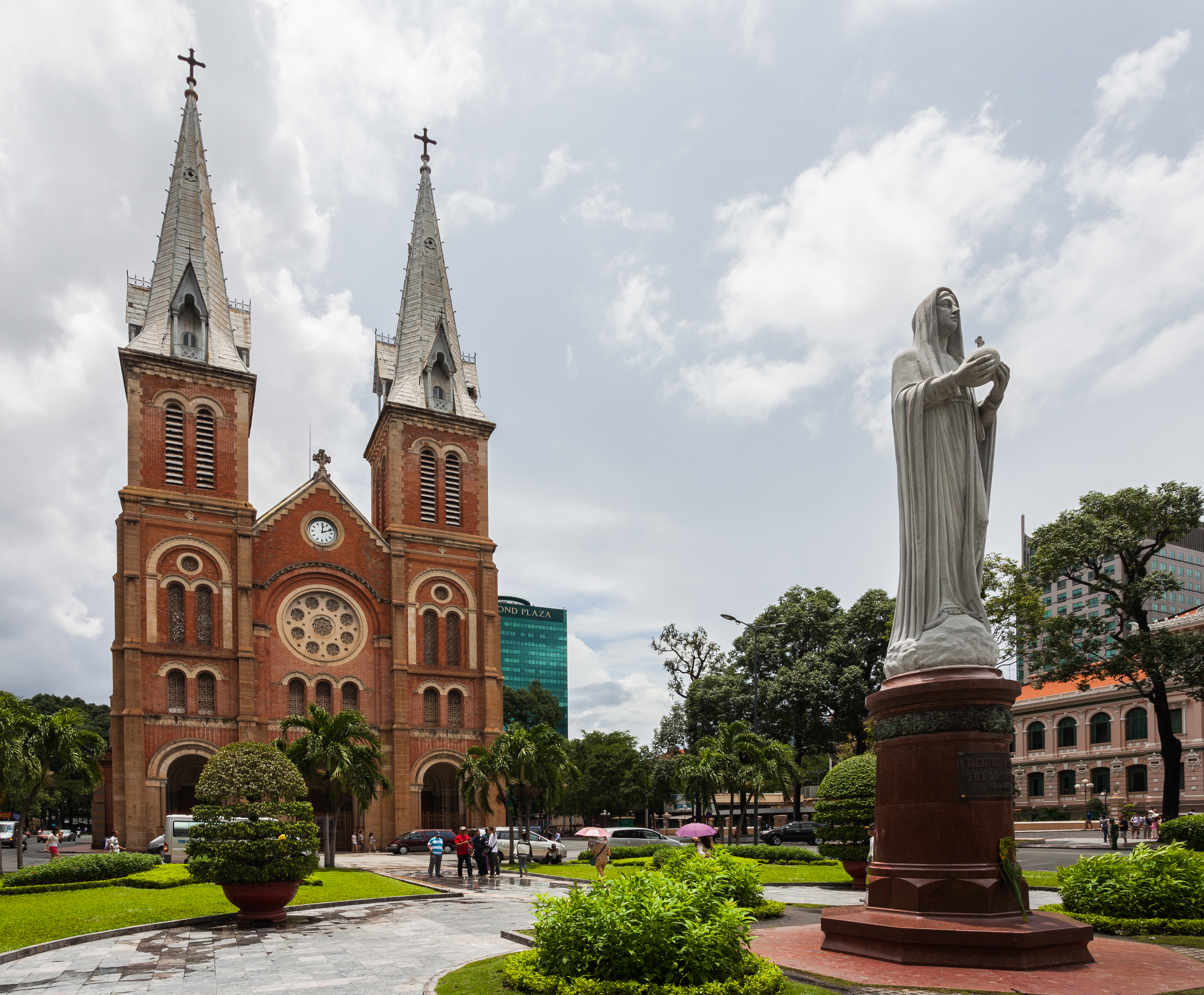
Notre Dame Basilica of Saigon

== Vietnam ==
- Saigon Notre-Dame Basilica, Ho Chi Minh City, Vietnam
- St. Joseph Cathedral, Hanoi, Vietnam
- Nha Trang Cathedral, Nha Trang, Vietnam
