= List of cathedrals in Austria =

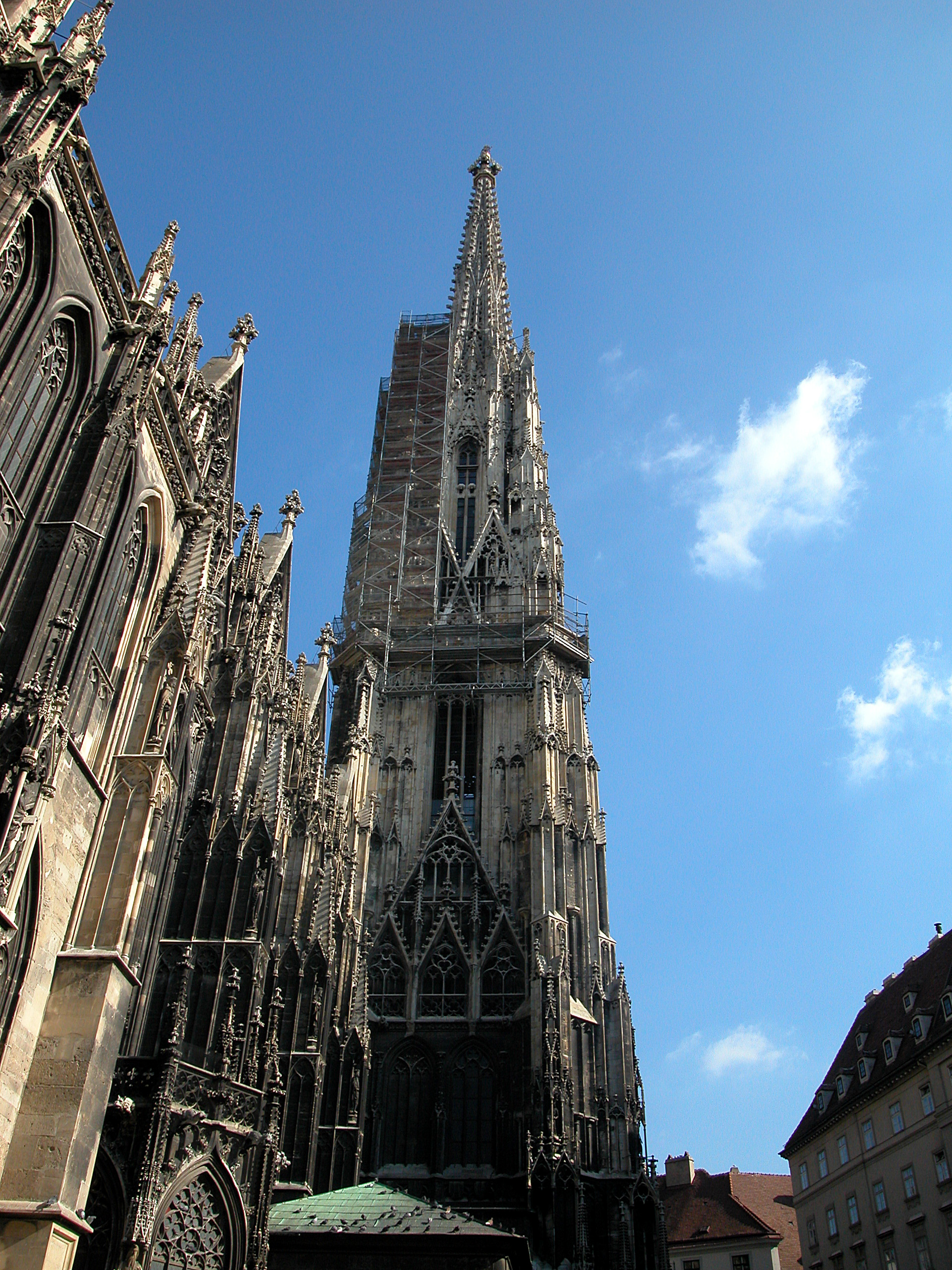
St. Stephen's Cathedral in Vienna

This is a list of cathedrals in Austria, including both actual and former diocesan cathedrals (seats of bishops). Almost all cathedrals in Austria are Catholic, but any non-Catholic cathedrals are also listed here.

The list is intended to be complete.

Although the word "Kathedrale" is used formally in German, the more usual word is "Dom". This not only refers to cathedrals in the proper sense as the seats of bishops, but also to a small number of large churches in Austria, which are known as "Dom" as a mark of distinction or historical importance (sometimes known by the description "Prachtdom", i.e., churches called "Dom" because of their magnificence or splendour). These are included in a separate section, without implying that they have the status of cathedrals.

== Catholic cathedrals ==
Cathedral	Archdiocese or Diocese	Location	Dedication	Description	Notes
Eisenstadt Cathedral; Eisenstädter Dom; Dom Sankt Martin, Eisenstadt	Diocese of Eisenstadt	Burgenland, Eisenstadt	Saint Martin	cathedral	from 1960, when the diocese was created
Feldkirch Cathedral; Feldkircher Dom; Dom Sankt Nikolai, Feldkirch	Diocese of Feldkirch	Vorarlberg, Feldkirch	Saint Nicholas	cathedral	from 1968, when the diocese was created
Göss Abbey; Reichsstift Göss; Stiftskirche St. Andrä	Diocese of Graz-Seckau	Styria, Leoben	Blessed Virgin Mary and Saint Andrew	former cathedral, previously an abbey church; now a parish church	Benedictine abbey 12th century-1782; cathedral of the Diocese of Leoben, founded 1785, abolished 1859 (although administered by the Diocese of Seckau after the death of the first and only bishop in 1800)
Graz Cathedral; Grazer Dom; Dom Sankt Ägydius, Graz	Diocese of Graz-Seckau	Styria, Graz	Saint Giles	cathedral	from 1782 or 1786, on the move of the seat of the Bishops of Seckau to Graz
Gurk Cathedral; Gurker Dom; Dom Mariä Himmelfahrt, Gurk	Diocese of Gurk-Klagenfurt	Carinthia, Gurk	Assumption of the Blessed Virgin Mary	co-cathedral	from 1787; cathedral of the Diocese of Gurk 1071-1787
Innsbruck Cathedral; Innsbrucker Dom; Dom Sankt Jakob, Innsbruck	Diocese of Innsbruck	Tyrol, Innsbruck	Saint James the Great	cathedral	from 1964, when the diocese of Innsbruck-Feldkirch was created; renamed diocese of Innsbruck in 1968
Klagenfurt Cathedral; Klagenfurter Dom; Dom der Heiligen Petrus und Paulus, Klagenfurt	Diocese of Gurk-Klagenfurt	Carinthia, Klagenfurt	Saint Peter and Saint Paul	cathedral	from 1787, when the bishops' seat was transferred here from Gurk
New Cathedral, Linz; Neuer Dom; Mariä-Empfängnis-Dom, Linz	Diocese of Linz	Upper Austria, Linz	Immaculate Conception	cathedral	from 1924, when dedicated, replacing the Old Cathedral, Linz; construction began in 1855/1862
Old Cathedral, Linz; Alter Dom; Domkirche St. Ignatius, Linz	Diocese of Linz	Upper Austria, Linz	Saint Ignatius Loyola	co-cathedral	from 1924, after the dedication of the present cathedral; cathedral 1785-1924; previously a Jesuit church (from 1669)
Basilica of St Laurence, Lorch; Basilika St. Laurenz	Diocese of Linz	Upper Austria, Enns, Lorch	Saint Lawrence	minor basilica	an earlier building on the site was the cathedral in the 4th/5th centuries of the bishopric of Lauriacum, the bishopric of the Roman province of Noricum; the present church dates from the 13th/14th centuries, and has never been the seat of a bishop (the title of Archbishop of Lauriacum has recently been re-created for a titular archbishopric).
Salzburg Cathedral; Salzburger Dom	Archdiocese of Salzburg	State of Salzburg, Salzburg	Saint Vergil and Saint Rupert	cathedral	from 987, in an earlier building on the site; the present building was dedicated in 1628
St. Peter's Archabbey, Salzburg; Erzabtei St. Peter	Archdiocese of Salzburg	State of Salzburg, Salzburg	Saint Peter	former cathedral, abbey church	until 987, the abbey church was also the cathedral, as the abbots of St. Peter's were also the Archbishops of Salzburg
Franciscan Church, Salzburg; Franziskanerkirche Unserer Lieben Frau, Salzburg	Archdiocese of Salzburg	State of Salzburg, Salzburg	Blessed Virgin Mary	pro-cathedral 1600-28, parish church; former friary church	used as cathedral while the present Salzburg Cathedral was under construction
Sankt Andrä Cathedral; St. Andrew's Church, Sankt Andrä; Dom- und Stadtpfarrkirche St. Andrä im Lavanttal	Diocese of Gurk-Klagenfurt	Carinthia, Sankt Andrä	Saint Andrew	former cathedral, now parish church	cathedral of the former Diocese of Lavant from 1228 to 1859, when the diocese was moved to Marburg (Maribor, now in Slovenia)
Sankt Pölten Cathedral; Sankt Pöltner Dom; Dom Mariä Himmelfahrt, Sankt Pölten	Diocese of Sankt Pölten	Lower Austria, Sankt Pölten	Assumption of the Blessed Virgin Mary	cathedral	from 1785 (diocese created in 1784/85)
Seckau Abbey; Dom- und Abteikirche Mariä Himmelfahrt; Dom im Gebirg	Diocese of Graz-Seckau	Seckau	Assumption of the Blessed Virgin Mary	co-cathedral, abbey church; minor basilica	from 1782; cathedral of the Diocese of Seckau 1218-1782, although in practice the bishops were based at the nearby Schloss Seggau
St. Stephen's Cathedral, Vienna; Stephansdom	Archdiocese of Vienna	Vienna	Saint Stephen	cathedral; World Heritage Site	from 1147, the date of foundation of the diocese
Wettingen-Mehrerau Abbey; Territorialabtei Wettingen-Mehrerau	territory of Wettingen-Mehrerau Abbey	Vorarlberg, Bregenz	The Blessed Virgin Mary, Star of the Sea, and of Mehrerau	territorial abbey (directly subordinate to the Holy See)	formerly Benedictine (c .611-1807), now Cistercian (from 1854); the abbot has the rank of a bishop in respect of the abbey's territory
Cathedral of the Military Ordinariate in Austria; St.-Georgs-Kathedrale, Wiener Neustadt	Military Ordinariate of Austria; Militärseelsorge Österreich	Lower Austria, Wiener Neustadt	Saint George	cathedral since 1987	also the chapel of Burg Wiener Neustadt and the Theresian Military Academy
Wiener Neustadt Cathedral; Dom Mariä Himmelfahrt und St. Rupert; Liebfrauendom	Archdiocese of Vienna	Lower Austria, Wiener Neustadt	Assumption of Mary and Saint Rupert	former cathedral, now parish church	cathedral from 1468 or 1469 to 1785 of the former Diocese of Wiener Neustadt (now a titular bishopric)

== Old Catholic cathedrals ==
Cathedral	Archdiocese or Diocese	Location	Dedication	Church	Notes
Church of the Holy Saviour, Vienna; Sankt Salvator, Wien; Salvatorkapelle	Old Catholic Church of Austria	Vienna, Innere Stadt, Wipplingerstraße 6 / Altes Rathaus	Holy Saviour	Old Catholic Church	former chapel of the Altes Rathaus

== Orthodox Cathedrals ==
Cathedral	Archdiocese or Diocese	Location	Dedication	Church	Notes
Coptic Church of Our Lady of Zeitoun; Koptische Kirche der Heiligen Jungfrau von Zeitoun	Coptic Church in Austria	Vienna, Donaustadt, Hirschstetten, Quadenstraße	Our Lady of Zeitoun	Coptic Church	
Russian Orthodox Cathedral, Vienna; Russisch-Orthodoxe Kathedrale, Wien	Patriarchate of Moscow and All Russia, Diocese of Vienna and Austria	Vienna, Landstraße, Jauresgasse	Saint Nicholas	Russian Orthodox Church	Russian Orthodox cathedral, Vienna
Holy Trinity Greek Orthodox Church, Vienna; Griechenkirche zur heiligen Dreifaltigkeit	Ecumenical Patriarchate of Constantinople: Metropolis of Austria and Exarchate of Hungary and Middle Europe	Vienna, Innere Stadt, Fleischmarkt	Holy Trinity	Greek Orthodox Church	

== Non-episcopal churches often referred to as Dom ==
The following churches are often referred to as Dom but have never been the seats of bishops:

- Maria Saaler Dom, or Church of the Assumption, Maria Saal, Carinthia: pilgrimage church (a predecessor church was the administrative centre of the missionary bishops - "chorepiscopi" - of Carinthia from the 8th century to 945 and similar in status to a cathedral; the present building dates from the 15th century and has never been the seat of a bishop)
- Pongauer Dom, or St. John's Church, St. Johann im Pongau, Salzburg (Land): parish church
- Söllandler Bauerndom, or Church of Saints Peter and Paul, Söll, Tyrol: parish church
- Dom am Pyhrn, Stift Spital am Pyhrn, Pfarrkirche Mariä Himmelfahrt, or Church of the Assumption, on the Pyhrn Pass, Spital am Pyhrn, Upper Austria: parish church, originally the church of a hospital, later a collegiate foundation, now a museum and concert venue

== See also ==
- Lists of cathedrals by country
