= List of Catholic dioceses in Austria =

The Catholic Church in Austria is currently composed of :

- two ecclesiastical provinces and 7 suffragan dioceses of the western Latin Church
- an exempt military ordinate and a territorial abbey, both also Latin Rite.
- an ordinariate for Eastern Catholic faithful, Byzantine Rite

== Current Dioceses ==
=== Austrian Episcopal Conference (Latin) ===
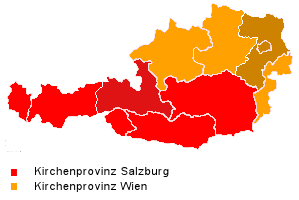

==== Latin Exempt Sui iuris Jurisdictions ====
- Military Ordinariate of Austria
- Territorial Abbey of Wettingen-Mehrerau

==== Ecclesiastical Province of Salzburg ====
- Metropolitan Archdiocese of Salzburg, primatial see of all Austria
  - Diocese of Feldkirch
  - Diocese of Graz-Seckau
  - Diocese of Gurk-Klagenfurt
  - Diocese of Innsbruck

==== Ecclesiastical Province of Vienna ====
- Metropolitan Archdiocese of Vienna
  - Diocese of Eisenstadt
  - Diocese of Linz
  - Diocese of Sankt Pölten

=== Eastern Catholic Exempt Sui iuris Ordinariate for Eastern Catholic faithful ===
- Ordinariate for Byzantine-rite Catholics in Austria

== Defunct jurisdictions ==
=== Latin Titular sees ===
==== Metropolitan titular archbishoprics ====
- Metropolitan Archdiocese of Tiburnia
- Metropolitan Archdiocese of Lauriacum

==== Titular bishoprics ====
- Ancient Diocese of Aguntum
- Ancient Diocese of Virunum
- Roman Catholic Diocese of Wiener Neustadt

=== Other defunct jurisdictions ===
Excluding precursors of present dioceses that were merely renamed or promoted

- Ancient Diocese of Juvavo
- Roman Catholic Diocese of Lavant (Lavanttal, Lavantin(us)), united with Metropolitan Archdiocese of Maribor
- Roman Catholic Diocese of Leoben, merged into Diocese of Graz–Seckau
- Stift Sankt Peter Salzburg, an Abbacy nullius

== Sources and external links ==
- GCatholic.org - data for all sections.
- Catholic-Hierarchy
