= Ordinariate for Byzantine-Rite Catholics in Austria =

Eastern Catholic jurisdiction in Austria

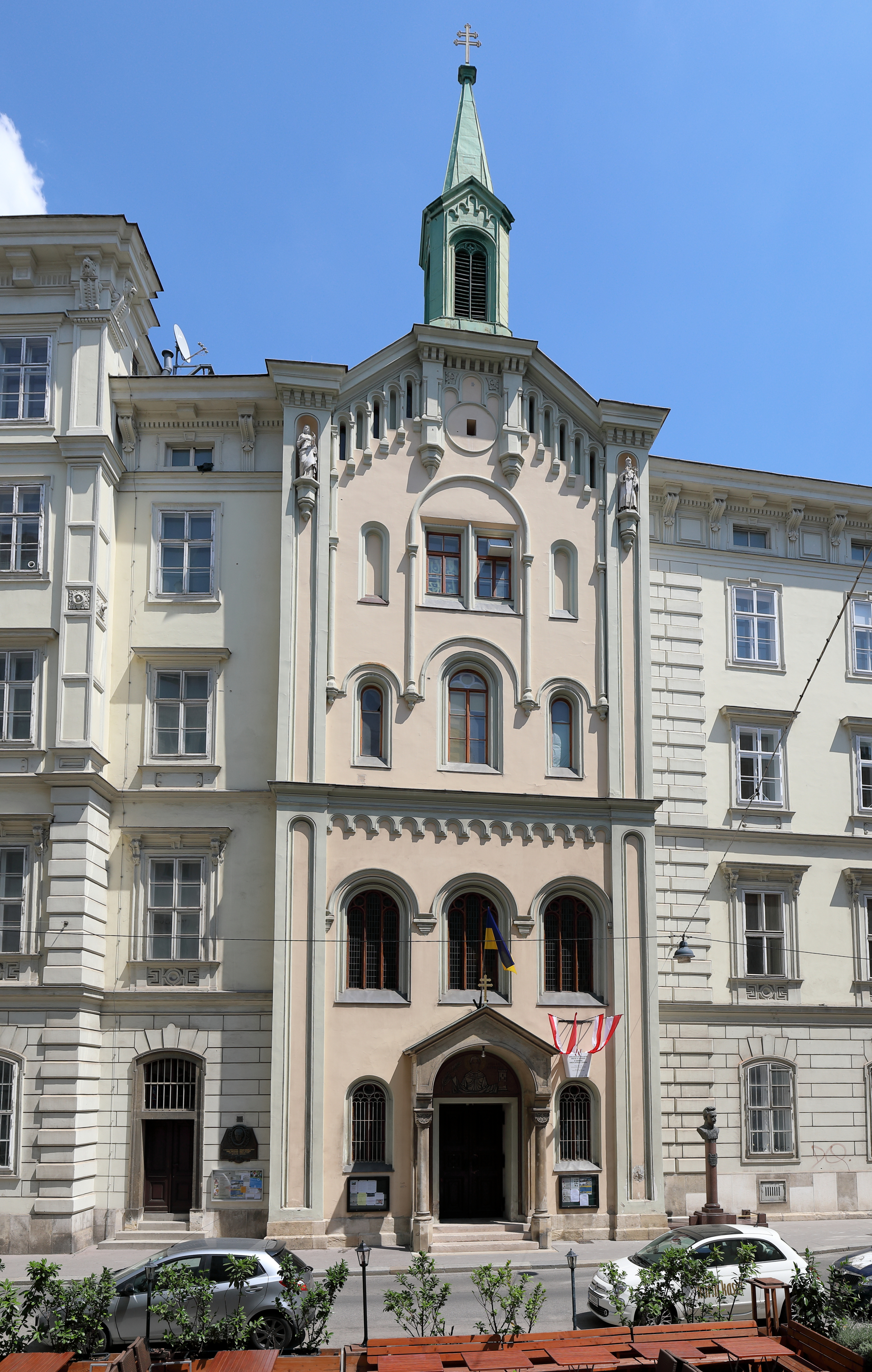
- Saint Barbara Church in Vienna

Location
- Country: Austria
- Ecclesiastical province: exempt, immediately subject to the Holy See

Statistics
- Population: (as of 2025); 10,000
- Parishes: 1

Information
- Rite: Byzantine Rite
- Established: 13 June 1956

Current leadership
- Pope: Leo XIV
- Bishop: Josef Grünwidl

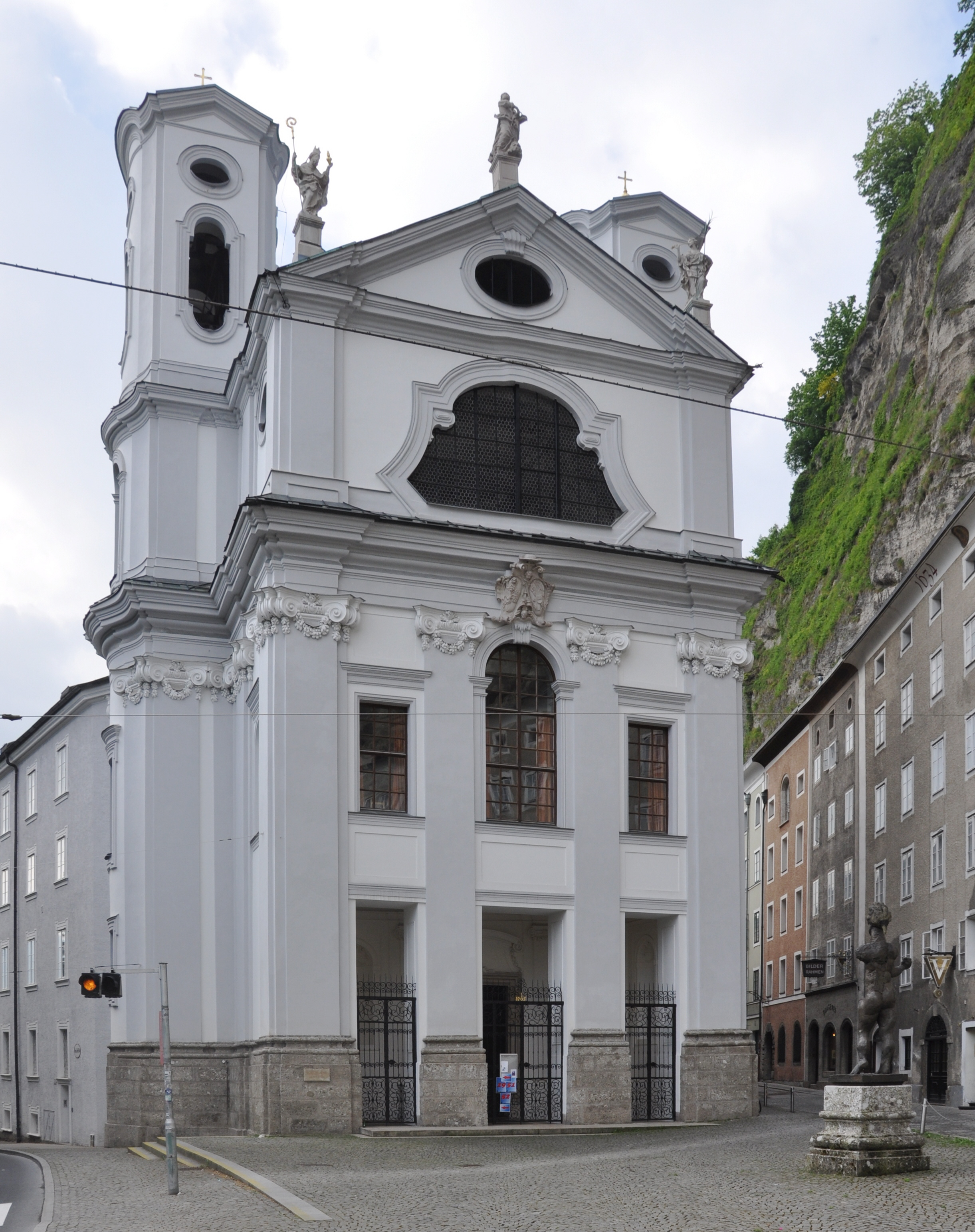
Saint Mark Ukrainian Catholic Church in Salzburg

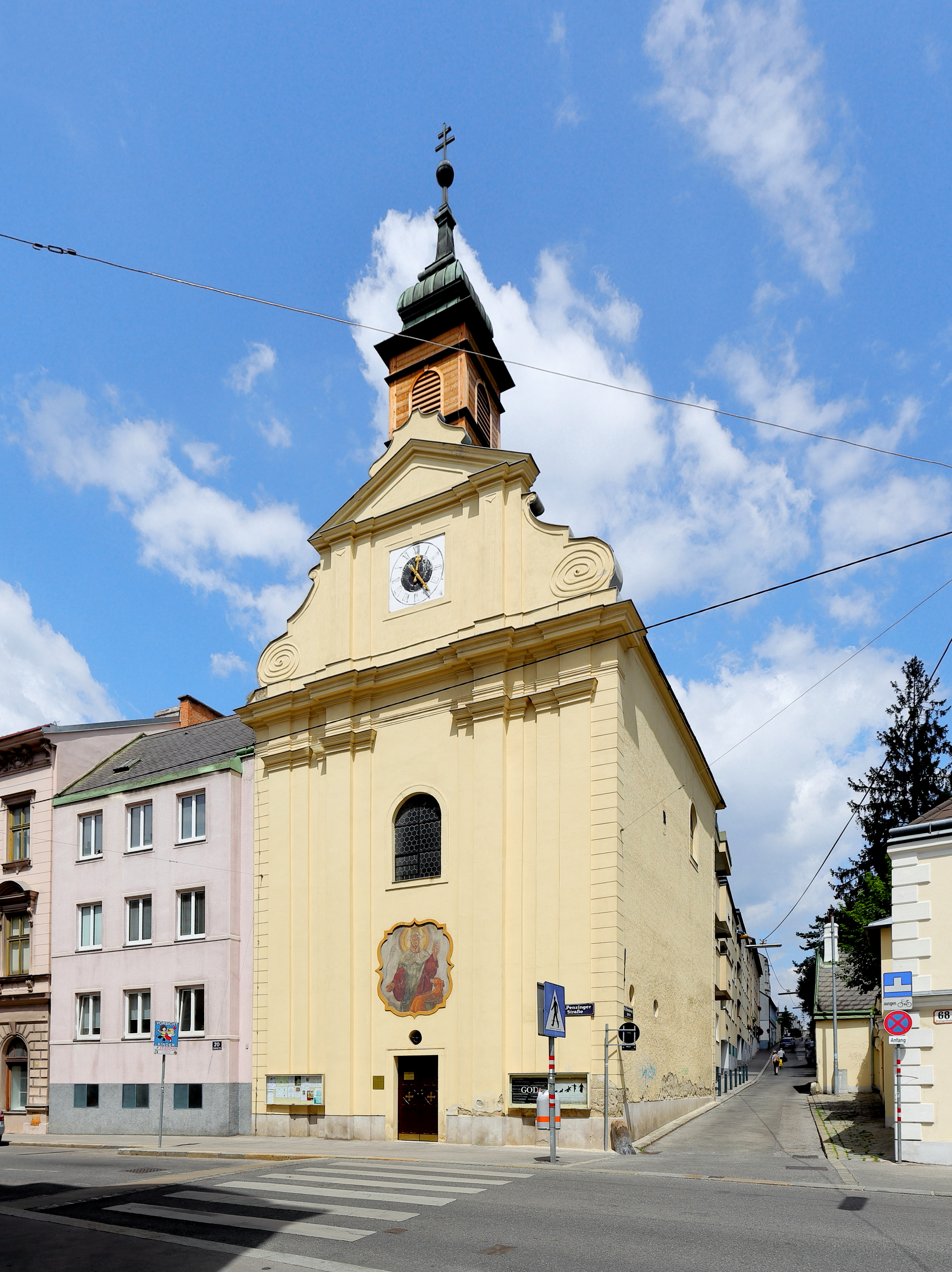
Saint Roch Chapel in Vienna, Romanian United Catholic church

The Ordinariate for Byzantine-Rite Catholics in Austria (or Ordinariate of Austria of the Eastern Rite) is a Catholic Ordinariate for Eastern Catholic faithful jointly for all Eastern Catholics of Byzantine Rite in the various languages of particular churches sui iuris in Austria.

It is exempt, being immediately subject to the Holy See and its Dicastery for the Eastern Churches.

== History ==
The Greek Catholic Churches were present in the Austrian Empire since November 21, 1611 when the Serbian Orthodox Bishop Simeon Vratanja of Marča traveled to Rome and formally accepted the jurisdiction of the pope over his bishopric, which eventually became the Eparchy of Križevci in 1777. As a result of the incorporation of Ukrainian territories into the Empire, in 1783 the first Ukrainian Greek-Catholic parish (called then Ruthenian) of St. Barbara in Vienna (Barbarakirche), approved by Emperor Joseph II of Austria, was founded.

With the Republic of Austria, the 1933 Holy See's Concordat was the legal basis.

In the course of the Cold War, when the Eastern Churches were in distress, in 1956 the Ordinariate was established as a diocese of the Austrian faithful. It is exempt, directly subordinate to the Holy See, and is personally headed by the Archbishop of Vienna. Until the 1980s, several other missions were created next to St. Barbara.

On December 12, 1935 a decree of the Congregation for the Oriental Churches decided that the parish of Santa Barbara in Vienna was transferred from the archieparchy of Lviv to the jurisdiction of the Archbishop of Vienna in a personal capacity as apostolic delegate (delegatus tamquam Sanctae Sedis specialiter), meaning that it was not included in the archdiocese of Vienna. The same decree arranged that all the Byzantine Catholic faithful of Austria should pass into the personal jurisdiction of the archbishop: In erga fideles rite commorantes Byzantini fines intra Reipublicae Austriacae.

Another decree of October 3, 1945, decided to extend the jurisdiction of the archbishop (facultates omnes) and on November 1, 1945 he was appointed vicar general of the Byzantine Catholics in Austria.

The ordinariate was established on 13 June 1956, on territory previously only served pastorally by the Latin church. It is vested in the Archbishop of Vienna, once capital of the Habsburg monarchy, which included many of the present Eastern (European) 'Greek' Catholic communities.

== Territory and statistics ==
The diocese extends to all the faithful who live in Austria and belong to the Byzantine Rite. Its episcopal see is the St. Barbara church, in Vienna (Wien), capital of Austria.

There are larger Ukrainian and Romanian communities and smaller Melkite, Byzantine groups of Italo-Albanians, Ruthenians, Greeks, Bulgarians, Slovaks and Hungarians.

The ordinary is regularly the archbishop of Vienna, who entrusts his administration to a vicar general protosyncellus based in Vienna, who since 2014 is Yurij Kolasa. The Romanian Mission (Misiunii Romane Unite din Vienna) has a rector, Vasile Lutai.

As per 2016, it pastorally served 10,000 Catholics in 1 parish and 8 missions.

=== Parish and chapels ===
==== Ukrainian Greek Catholic Church ====
The Ukrainian Greek Catholic central parish is in the church of Santa Barbara in Vienna, which is the only parish of the Ordinariate (central parish), together with three other Byzantine chapels in Lower Austria.

Except in Vienna are currently Ukrainian Greek Catholic chapels in Salzburg (St. Mark's Church) Innsbruck (auxiliary funeral parish at the international seminary Collegium Canisianum) Graz (Mary Help of Christians Church) and Linz (Carmelite Church).

The first congregation in present-day Austria was founded in Vienna in 1783, when Galicia and Lodomeria became part of the Habsburg monarchy during the Polish partition and Ukrainians, also called Ruthenians increasingly came to the capital of the empire. As early as 1773, Maria Theresa had handed over the repealed Viennese Jesuit convent as barbarous to the Greek Catholic.

After the end of the Second World War, the number of Ukrainian Greek Catholic faithful in Austria increased again significantly. The newcomers mostly migrated to North America and Australia. In the 1990s, Ukrainian Catholic war refugees from Bosnia Herzegovina, mostly from the Republika Srpska, fled to Austria, and more emigrations from Ukraine and Poland took place, which in turn increased the number of believers.

==== Romanian Greek Catholic Church ====
The Romanian Greek Catholic mission is based in the Saint Roch Chapel in Vienna also using the church of St. George in Kagran. Other communities exist in Graz, Linz, Murau and Wiener Neustadt.

There was also a community in Salzburg, which was dissolved in the 1950s.

==== Melkite Greek Catholic Church ====
The Melkite Greek Catholic community is based at Saint Jacob in Vienna.

==== German-speaking Catholic Byzantine communities ====
There are also German-speaking Catholic Byzantine communities that meet in the church of Santa Barbara in Vienna (where there is a Hungarian Byzantine priest and another Ruthenian) and in Salzburg.

In the decade of 1950 a small Russian Byzantine Catholic community existed in Salzburg, but it disappeared after the death of its priest.

=== List of parishes with churches, chapels and pastoral offices ===
Parish/Other organization	Seat	Byzantine Catholic Church	Since	Patronage	Churches, chapels and pastoral centers
Saint Barbara Church	Innere Stadt, Vienna	Ukrainian Greek Catholic Church	1783	Saint Barbara (December, 4)	Parish: Saint Barbara Church Chapels: Castle Chapel (Trumau, Lower Austria), Gaming Charterhouse (Gaming, Lower Austria) Geras Abbey (Geras, Lower Austria) Other Greek Catholic pastoral and student care: International Theological Institute, Trumau, (Lower Austria) Social Medical Center East - Donauspital (Vienna)
Ukrainian community in Salzburg	Salzburg	Ukrainian Greek Catholic Church	1970s	Saint Mark (April, 25)	Church: Saint Mark (Salzburg) Pastoral center: Byzantine Prayer Center (Salzburg)
Ukrainian community in Innsbruck	Innsbruck	Ukrainian Greek Catholic Church	1970s	Saint Olga (11 July) and Saint Vladimir (15 July)	Chapel of Saints Vladimir and Olga in Collegium Canisianum (Innsbruck)
Ukrainian community in Linz	Linz	Ukrainian Greek Catholic Church	1970s		Church: Carmelite Church (Linz)
Ukrainian community in Graz	Graz	Ukrainian Greek Catholic Church	1970s		Church:Mary Help of Christians Church (Graz)
Romanian community in Vienna	Penzing, Vienna	Romanian Greek Catholic Church	1970s		Chapel: Saint Roch (Vienna) Pastoral centers:Geriatric Center Baumgarten (Vienna), Hanusch Hospital (Vienna) and Social Medical Center East - Donauspital (Vienna)
Romanian community in Graz	Eggenberg, Graz	Romanian Greek Catholic Church	1980s	John the Evangelist (December, 27)	Church:Fourteen Holy Helpers Church (Graz) Pastoral care: Hospital of the Brothers of Charity (Eggenberg, Graz)
Melkite community in Vienna	Heiligenstadt, Vienna	Melkite Greek Catholic Church	1970s		Saint James Church (Vienna)
German-speaking Catholic Byzantine community	Innere Stadt, Vienna		1980s		Church: Saint Barbara Pastoral care for Hungarian and Ruthenian Greek Catholics

== Episcopal ordinaries ==
(all Roman Rite)

Name	From	To
Franz König	13 June 1956	16 September 1985
Hans Hermann Groër, O.S.B.	21 February 1987	14 September 1995
Christoph Schönborn, O.P.	6 November 1995	11 July 2026
Josef Grünwidl	11 July 2026	present

== See also ==
- List of Catholic dioceses in Austria
- Catholic Church in Austria
- List of Jesuit sites

== Sources and external links ==
- Gcatholic, with Google map and satellite photo - data for all sections
- Catholic-hierarchy.org
- ukrainische-kirche.at
- Website of St. Barbara Church in Wien (st-barbara-austria.org)
- Kath website
- Byzantine Ordinariate of Austria st-barbara-austria.org
- Byzantine Ordinariate in Austria ruk-wien.at
- Struktur der Seelsorge für die ukrainische griechisch-katholischen Gläubigen ukrainische-kirche-innsbruck.at
- erzdioezese-wien.at
