= Josef Grünwidl =

Austrian Roman Catholic archbishop (born 1963)

His Excellency Josef Grünwidl
- Archbishop of Vienna
- Grünwidl in 2026
- Church: Roman Catholic
- Archdiocese: Vienna
- Appointed: 17 October 2025
- Installed: 24 January 2026
- Predecessor: Christoph Schönborn
- Other post: Ordinary for Byzantine-Rite Catholics in Austria (since 2026)

Orders
- Ordination: 29 June 1988 by Franz König
- Consecration: 24 January 2026 by Christoph Schönborn

Personal details
- Born: 31 January 1963 (age 63) Hollabrunn, Austria
- Motto: Melodiam Dei recipite (Receive the melody of God)
- Coat of arms

Josef Grünwidl (born 31 January 1963) is an Austrian Roman Catholic prelate who has served as metropolitan archbishop of the Archdiocese of Vienna since January 2026. He had previously served as the archdiocese's apostolic administrator since January 2025. Aside from one year in Germany, he was educated in the Archdiocese and has spent his career in Lower Austria since becoming a priest in 1988.

== Early years and education ==
Josef Grünwidl was born on 31 January 1963 in the Hollabrunn district and grew up in Wullersdorf in Lower Austria. He attended the Archbishop's High School in Hollabrunn, graduating in 1981. He then entered the seminary of the Archdiocese of Vienna and studied theology at the University of Vienna. At the same time, he studied organ at the University of Music and Performing Arts Vienna. While studying for a year in Würzburg in 1983/84 he decided to become a priest. He wrote his diploma thesis, "Suffering is in God", on Jürgen Moltmann's theology of the cross, under Josef Weismayer in 1987.

== Priesthood ==
In 1987, Grünwidl was ordained a deacon by Auxiliary Bishop Helmut Krätzl. He completed his deaconry year in Perchtoldsdorf. On 29 June 1988, he was ordained a priest by Cardinal Franz König in St. Stephen's Cathedral in Vienna.

Grünwidl served as chaplain at the parish of St. John Nepomuk in Vienna from 1988 to 1991 and was curate of the cathedral parish of Wiener Neustadt from 1991 to 1993. From 1993 to 1995, he served as diocesan youth pastor for the Archdiocese of Vienna. From 1995 to 1998, he was secretary to the new Archbishop of Vienna, Christoph Schönborn. From 1998 to 2014, Grünwidl served as pastor in Kirchberg am Wechsel and the surrounding parishes of Feistritz, St. Corona, and Trattenbach. He also served as dean of the Kirchberg am Wechsel deanery from 2007 to 2014. In 2014, he moved to the parish of Perchtoldsdorf, where he served as parish moderator until 2023 and, from 2016, also held the office of dean of the Perchtoldsdorf deanery. From 2016 to March 2023, Grünwidl served as the chairman of Vienna Archdiocesan Priests Council. He became Episcopal Vicar for the Southern Vicariate in January 2023. In November 2024, he was appointed an honorary canon of the Cathedral Chapter of St. Stephen's.

On 22 January 2025, Pope Francis appointed him apostolic administrator of the Archdiocese.

== Archbishop of Vienna ==
The press reported on 15 October 2025 that the Holy See had confidentially communicated his appointment as the new archbishop of Vienna to the Government of Austria as required by Article IV. § 2 of the Concordat of 1933, in order to identify any objections of a political nature. On 17 October 2025, having received no objection from the government, the appointment by Pope Leo XIV was officially announced. Grünwidl had several times declined the position. He explained that the delay in filling the position was due to his own hesitation. His episcopal ordination took place on 24 January 2026, with Christoph Schönborn presiding as episcopal principal consecrator. Grünwidl remained apostolic administrator of the archdiocese until then.

== Viewpoints ==
He once belonged to a reform advocacy group called the Priests' Initiative which supported disobedience against Pope Benedict XVI. He eventually left the group because he did not support disobedience against Pope Francis, instead preferring critical obedience.

At the press conference announcing his appointment, he said: "I have firmly resolved that as archbishop I will not be absorbed in management and administrative tasks, but will remain a pastor."

Grünwidl has pubically called for the ordination of women and the abolishment of clerical celibacy.
