= Military Ordinariate of Austria =

Catholic ecclesiastical jurisdiction

Coordinates: 47°48′32″N 16°14′41″E

Military Ordinariate of Austria Ordinariatus Militaris Austriae Militärordinariat der Republik Österreich

Catholic
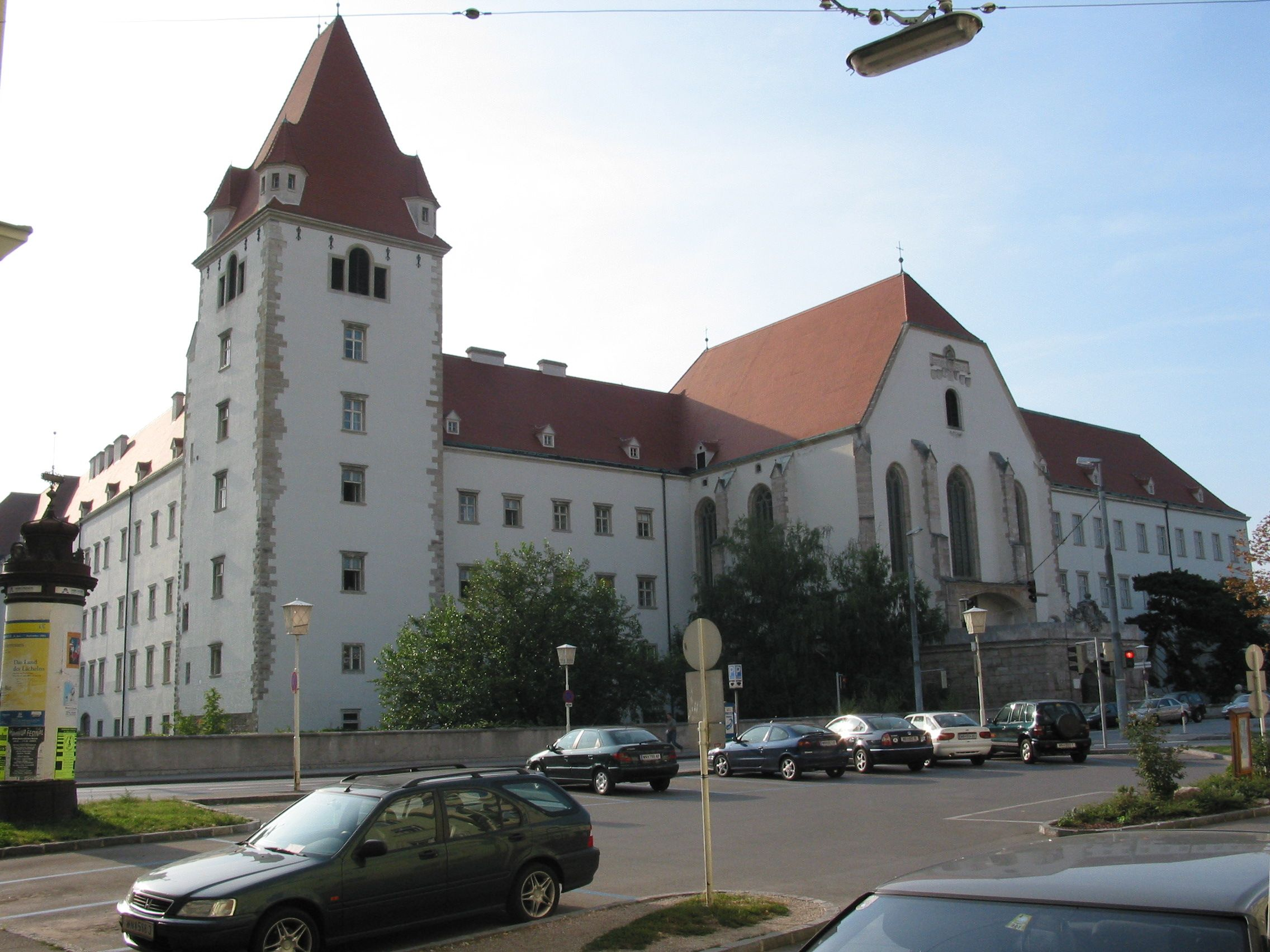
- St. George's Cathedral, Burg Wiener Neustadt

Location
- Country: Austria
- Ecclesiastical province: Immediately exempt to the Holy See

Statistics
- Population: 100 000
- Parishes: 21

Information
- Denomination: Catholic Church
- Sui iuris church: Latin Church
- Rite: Roman Rite
- Established: Military bishopric in 1773; Military vicariate in 1959; Military ordinariate in 1986
- Cathedral: St. George's Cathedral in Wiener Neustadt

Current leadership
- Pope: Leo XIV
- Bishop: Werner Freistetter
- Vicar General: Peter Papst
- Bishops emeritus: Christian Werner

Website
- Website of the Diocese

The Military Ordinariate of Austria (German: Militärordinariat der Republik Österreich, Latin: Ordinariatus Militaris Austriae) is a Latin Church military ordinariate of the Catholic Church. Immediately exempt to the Holy See, it provides pastoral care to Catholics serving in the Austrian Armed Forces and their families.

== History ==
The Theresian Military Academy had been founded at the castle of Wiener Neustadt in Austria by Empress Maria Theresa in 1751. Twenty-two years later, the empress created the office of military bishop in 1773, to be held by the bishop of Wiener Neustadt. However, the Diocese of Wiener Neustadt was abolished in 1785 and merged with the Archdiocese of Vienna. The last bishop of Wiener Neustadt, Johann Heinrich von Kerens, became the first bishop of Sankt Pölten. After the First World War, there was a gap of over fifty years without any military bishops being appointed.

On 21 February 1959, a military vicariate was established, with Cardinal Franz König, Archbishop of Vienna, appointed as the first military vicar. By the apostolic constitution decree "Spirituali militum curae", it was raised to a military ordinariate on 21 July 1986.

The current military ordinary is the Reverend Monsignor Werner Freistetter, appointed by Pope Francis on Thursday, 16 April 2015. He succeeds the Most Reverend Bishop Christian Werner, who in turn had succeeded to the post on 22 February 1994, and had been appointed Titular Bishop of Wiener Neustadt by Pope John Paul II on 11 October 1997. The military ordinary has the same status as a diocesan bishop and is a member of the Austrian Episcopal Conference. The military ordinary's seat is located at St. George's Cathedral (St. Georgs-Kathedrale) in Wiener Neustadt.

After 1990 the Bishops of the Military Ordinariate bear the title of Bishop of Wiener Neustadt.

== List of office holders ==
From	Until	Name	Notes
Military bishopric
1773		Ferdinand Michael Cyriakus von Hallweil	Appointed Military Bishop in 1773; also was Bishop of Wiener Neustadt 1741–1773; died in office on 6 June 1773
1773	1792	Johann Heinrich von Kerens, S.J.	Previously Bishop of Roermond 1770–1773; appointed Military Bishop on 6 November 1773; also was Bishop of Wiener Neustadt 1773–1785 and Bishop of Sankt Pölten 1785–1792; died in office on 26 November 1792
1792	1803	See vacant	
1803	1815	Godfried Joseph Crüts van Creits	Appointed Military Bishop on 28 July 1803; also was Bishop of Sankt Pölten 1806–1815; died in office on 5 April 1815
1815	1826	Joseph Chrysostomus Pauer	Appointed Military Bishop on 24 April 1815; also was Titular Bishop of Dulma 1815–1823; translated to the Diocese of Sankt Pölten on 10 November 1823
1823	1833	See vacant	
1833	1835	Michael Johann Wagner	Appointed and Military Bishop on 27 April 1833; also was Titular Bishop of Belgrado e Semendria o Smederevo 1833–1835; translated to the Diocese of Sankt Pölten on 16 November 1835
1835	1863	Johann Michael Leonhard	Previously Bishop of Sankt Pölten; appointed Military Bishop on 19 November 1835; also appointed Titular Bishop of Diocletianopolis in Palaestina on 1 February 1836; died in office on 19 January 1863
1863	1875	Dominik Mayer	Appointed Military Bishop on 1 October 1863; also was Titular Bishop of Cisamus 1863–1875; died in office on 4 May 1875
1875	1878	See vacant	
1878	1890	Anton Josef Gruscha	Appointed and Military Bishop on 19 January 1878; also was Titular Bishop of Carrhae 1878–1890; ordained bishop on 28 April 1878; translated to the Archdiocese of Vienna on 24 January 1890
1890	1911	Koloman Belepotoczky	Appointed Military Bishop on 22 July 1890; also was Titular Bishop of Tricale 1890–1914; ordained bishop on 5 October 1890; resigned as Military Bishop on 1 June 1911; died on 15 December 1914
1911	1913	See vacant	
1913	1918	Emmerich Bjelik	Appointed Military Bishop on 8 January 1913; also was Titular Bishop of Thasus 1913–1927; ordained bishop on 22 February 1913; resigned as Military Bishop on 11 November 1918; died on 9 May 1927
1918	1924	See vacant	
1924	1938	Ferdinand Stanislaus Pawlikowski	Appointed Military Vicar 1 October 1924; ordained Bishop 25 February 1927; Bishop of Roman Catholic Diocese of Graz-Seckau; Titular Bishop of Dadima; Titular Archbishop of Velebusdus
1938	1959	See vacant	
Military vicariate
1959	1969	Cardinal Franz König	Appointed Military Vicar on 21 February 1959; also was Archbishop of Vienna 1956–1985; resigned as Military Vicar on 7 May 1969
1969	1985	Franz Žak	Appointed Military Vicar on 8 May 1969; also was Bishop of Sankt Pölten 1961–1991; resigned as Military Vicar on 27 September 1985
Military ordinariate
1986	1994	Alfred Kostelecky	Previously Auxiliary Bishop of Vienna and Titular Bishop of Aggar 1986–1990; appointed Military Ordinary on 12 November 1986; transferred to the Titular Title of Wiener Neustadt on 10 February 1990; died in office on 22 February 1994
1994	2015	Christian Werner	Appointed Coadjuator Bishop of the Military Ordinariate and Titular Bishop of Aeca on 9 January 1992; consecrated bishop on 2 February 1992; succeeded Military Ordinary on 22 February 1994; also appointed Titular Bishop of Wiener Neustadt on 11 October 1997
2015	Present	Werner Freistetter	appointed Bishop of the Military Ordinariate on 16 April 2015; consecrated bishop on 11 June 2015
