= Joseph Chrysostomus Pauer =

Austrian prelate (1756–1826)

- Bishop of Sankt Pölten
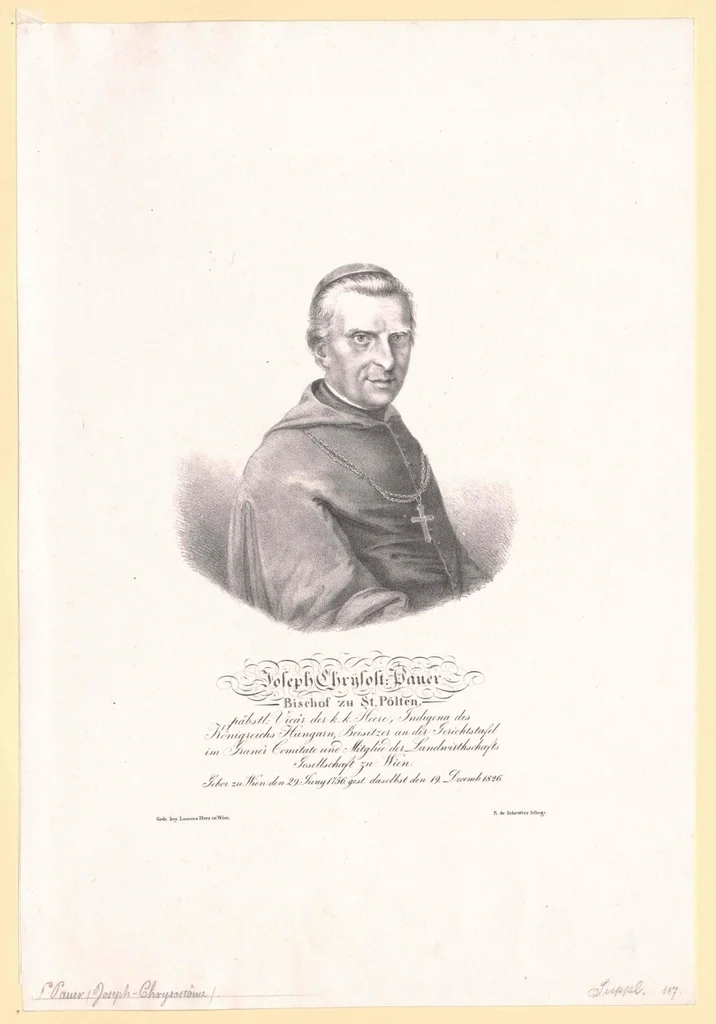
- Church: Catholic Church
- Diocese: Diocese of Sankt Pölten
- In office: 3 May 1824 – 19 December 1826
- Predecessor: Johann Nepomuk Dankesreither
- Successor: Jakub Frint
- Previous posts: Titular Bishop of Dulma (1818-1824); Bishop of the Military Ordinariate of Austria (1815-1824)

Orders
- Ordination: 29 May 1779
- Consecration: 2 August 1818 by Sigismund Anton von Hohenwart

Personal details
- Born: 29 June 1756 Vienna, Archduchy of Austria, Austrian Circle, Holy Roman Empire
- Died: 19 December 1826 (aged 70)

Joseph Chrysostomus Pauer (29 June 1756 – 19 December 1826) was an Austrian prelate of the Catholic Church who served as the bishop of Sankt Pölten from 1824 to his death in 1826. Pauer previously served as a military vicar of Austria and the titular bishop of Duvno from 1818 to 1824.

== Biography ==
Pauer was a Jesuit novice until the suppression of the order in 1773, when he moved to the Barnabites' professed house (Michaelerhaus) near the Church of St. Michael on Michaelerplatz in Vienna. He was ordained to the diaconate on 19 September 1778 and to the priesthood on 29 May 1779. In 1797 he became a chaplain of the royal guard. He was active in all offices of military pastoral care, from 1796 as a superior and 1806 as the director of military pastoral care. On 18 November 1802, he was incardinated from the Barnabites to the Diocese of Sankt Pölten. On 24 April 1815, Pauer was appointed the military vicar of Austria and on 25 May 1818, the titular bishop of Duvno. His episcopal consecration took place on 2 August 1818, with Archbishop Sigismund Anton von Hohenwart of Vienna as the principal consecrator and Titular Bishop Adeodatus Papikian of Ejmiatsin and Titular Bishop Matthias Paul Steindl of Anteapolis as the co-consecrators. He also served as a provost in Altbunzlau and an honorary canon of Sankt Pölten. On 10 November 1823, he was selected for the office of the bishop of Sankt Pölten and confirmed by the Pope on 3 May 1824, retaining the office of the military vicar. He was installed on 13 June 1824.

== Footnotes ==
Catholic Church titles
Preceded by Francesco Maria Biordi	Bishop of Duvno; 1818–1824	Succeeded by Franciszek Pawłowski
Preceded by Godfried Joseph Crüts van Creits	Military Vicar of Austria; 1818–1826	Succeeded by Michael Johann Wagner
Preceded by Johann Nepomuk von Dankesreither	Bishop of Sankt Pölten; 1824–1826	Succeeded by Jakob Frint
