= Daun Barracks =

Coordinates: 47.8084°N 16.2454°E

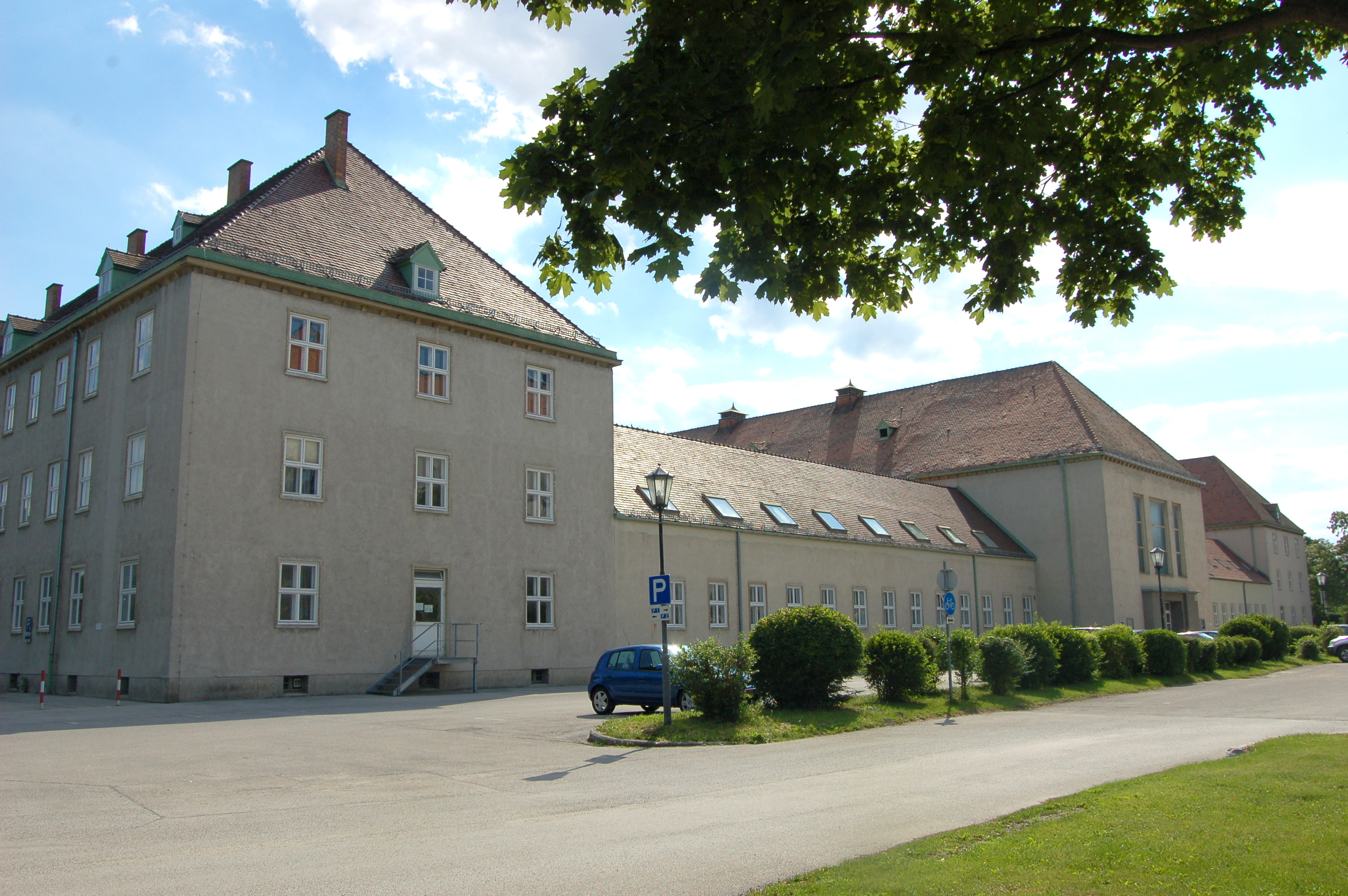
Daun Barracks

Daun Barracks in Wiener Neustadt in Lower Austria was built by the German Wehrmacht from 1939 to 1940 as a course building in the Academy Park south of the castle.

== History ==
The barracks were built on the site of a swimming pool. The three-storey complex has two courtyards in the north and an open courtyard to the south. Facing towards the castle, the facade has an Avant-corps with round arches. The windows have a stone framing. The foyer and ballroom were designed with monumental stone pillars.

Having been damaged during the war the building was repaired from 1948 to 1949, and from 1950 was used as a building for municipal schools. After Wiener Neustadt became a garrison again in 1956, the Austrian Army moved in on 14 September 1956. As the Feldjägerbataillon 1, which was moved to the barracks from Graz, was the first unit moved in, the barracks were referred to as Feldjägerkaserne. A few days after the first conscripts were moved into the barracks, the troops were moved to Burgenland in response to the revolution in Hungary, for border security. Between 15 and 20 December 1956, the Feldjägerbataillon was moved back to the barracks. During the following years, different units were stationed or set up here.

On 20 December 1966, the barracks were officially named after the 18th-century Field Marshal Leopold Joseph von Daun as Daun barracks. Today the Daun barracks is run as a school battalion with two companies.

== Sources ==
- Rudolf Marwan-Schlosser: Kasernen, Soldaten, Ereignisse. Kasernen und militärische Einrichtungen in Wiener Neustadt, Bad Fischau, Wöllersdorf, Katzelsdorf, Felixdorf-Grossmittel-Blumau. Weilburg-Verlag, Wiener Neustadt 1983, ISBN 3-900100-09-8.
- Dehio-Handbuch. Die Kunstdenkmäler Österreichs: Niederösterreich südlich der Donau. Teil 2. M bis Z. Wiener Neustadt. Akademiepark. Bauten im Akademiepark. Daun-Kaserne. Bundesdenkmalamt, Verlag Berger, Horn / Wien 2003, ISBN 3-85028-365-8.
