= St. George's Cathedral, Wiener Neustadt =

Coordinates: 47°48′37″N 16°14′42″E

- Cathedral of the Austrian Military Ordinariate
- Kathedrale St. Georg
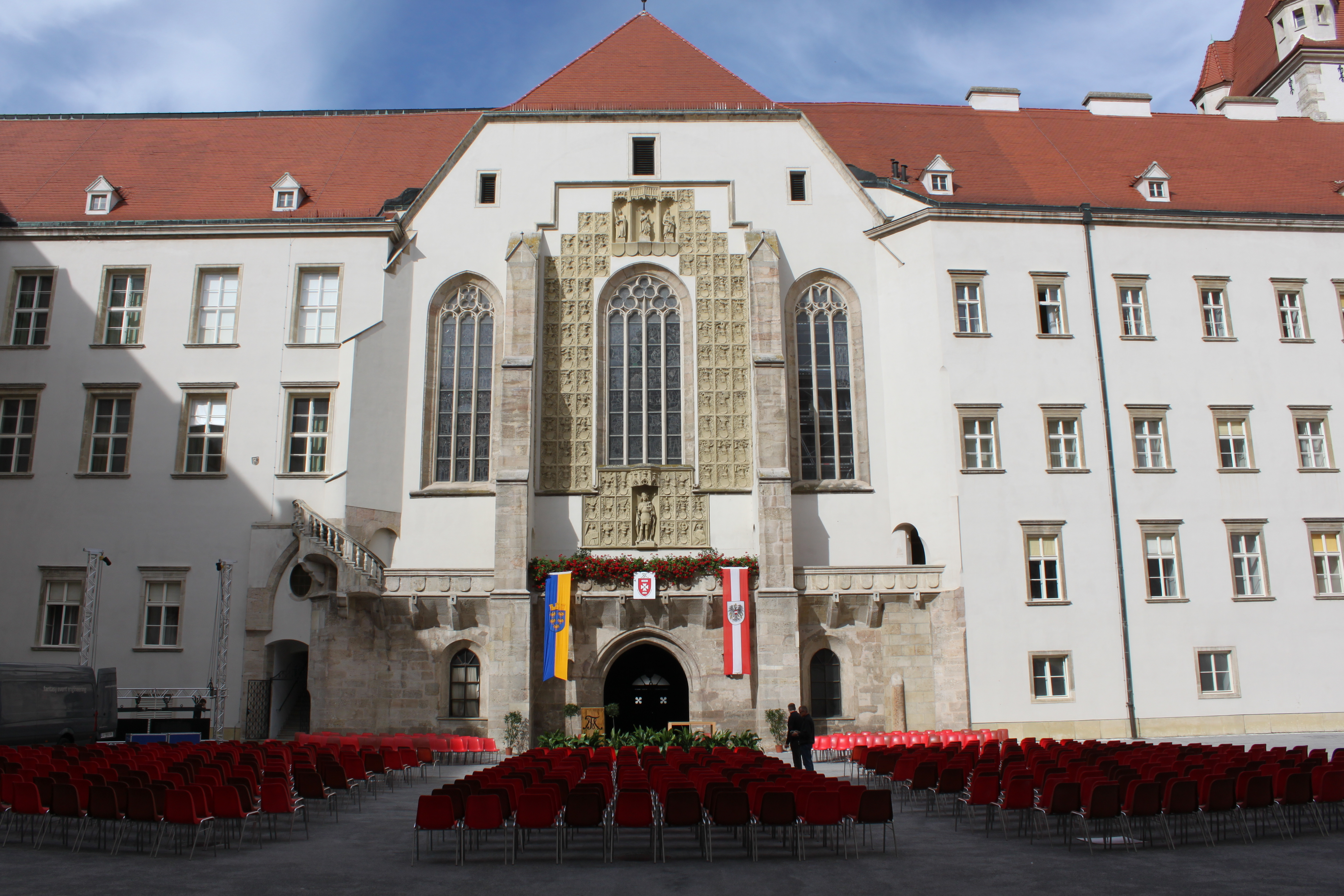
- St. George's Cathedral, Wiener Neustadt
- Location: Wiener Neustadt
- Country: Austria
- Denomination: Roman Catholic Church

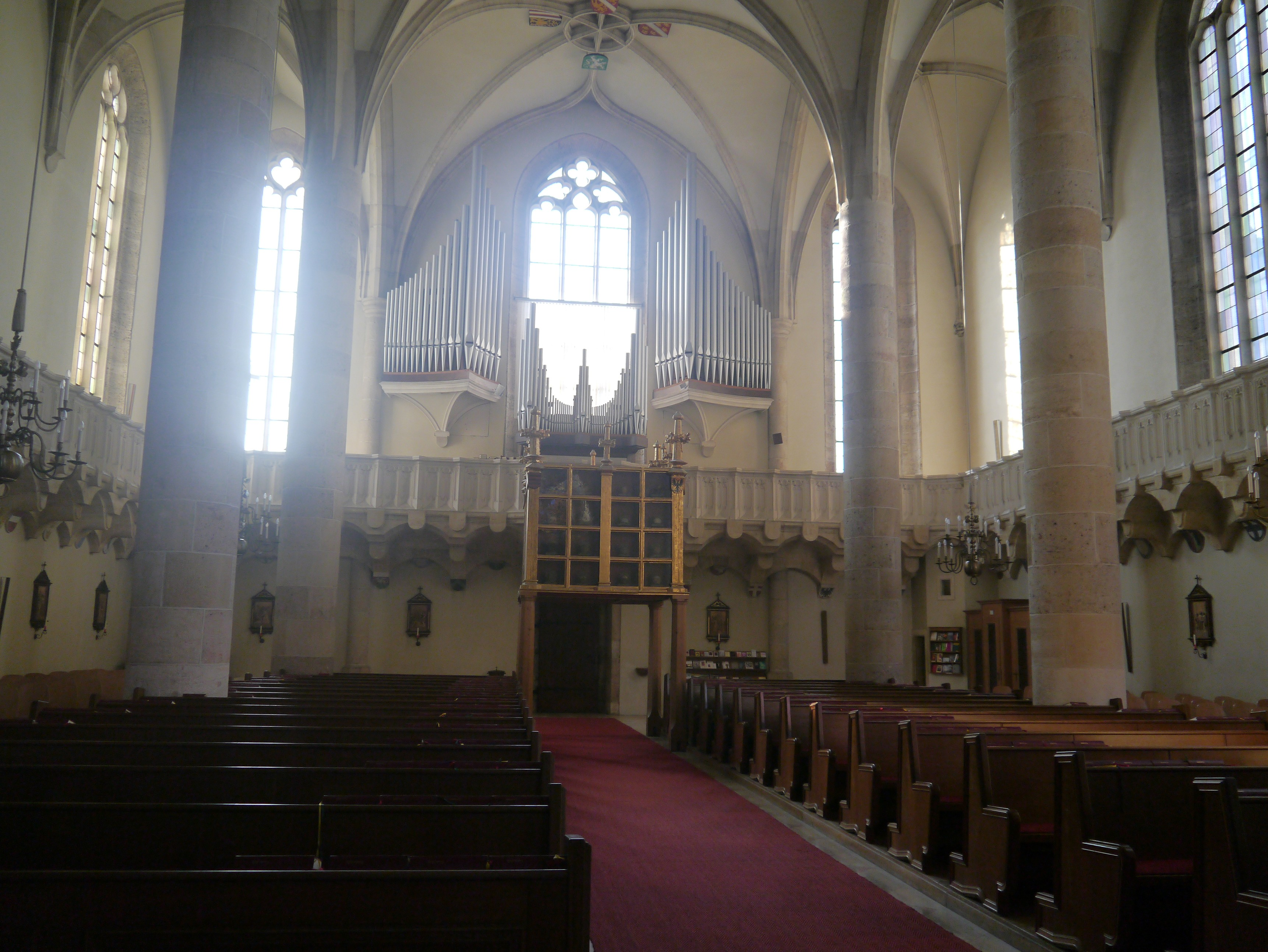
Interior view

St. George's Cathedral in Wiener Neustadt (German: Kathedrale St. Georg) is the cathedral of the Military Ordinariate of Austria and a minor basilica. It is located inside the castle, Burg Wiener Neustadt.

The church, begun in 1440 on the west side of the castle, was commissioned from the architect Peter von Pusica by Frederick III, Holy Roman Emperor. At the end of the work the church was dedicated to St. Mary and consecrated in 1460. In 1479 the Order of the Knights of St. George established their headquarters in Wiener Neustadt, and the patron of the church became Saint George. After the abolition of this chivalric order in 1600, the church was entrusted first to the Cistercians and later the Piarists. In 1608 and 1616 two fires damaged the castle and the church, which were repaired by initiative of Maximilian III.

With the foundation of the Theresian Military Academy on December 14, 1751, the church was closely tied to the fate of the castle as the headquarters of the military school. The castle and church were completely destroyed in bombing during the Second World War on March 12, 1945, but reconstruction began the following year, to be completed only in 1958.

Since 1963 the church has been home to the Military Ordinariate of Austria, as a result of which it was elevated to the status of cathedral. On 13 December 1967 it also became a minor basilica.

== See also ==
- Wiener Neustadt Cathedral
