= Franz König =

Austrian Roman Catholic cardinal (1905–2004)

His Eminence Franz König
- Cardinal, Archbishop emeritus of Vienna
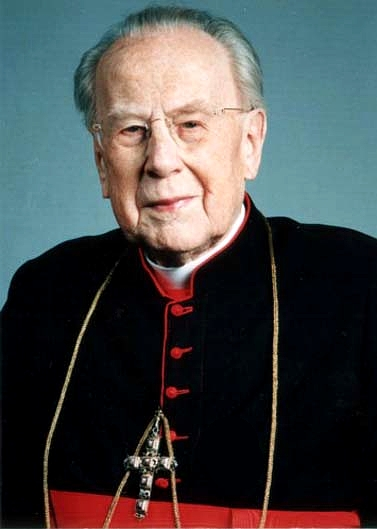
- Archdiocese: Vienna
- See: Vienna
- Appointed: 10 May 1956
- Term ended: 16 September 1985
- Predecessor: Theodor Cardinal Innitzer
- Successor: Hans Hermann Groër
- Other posts: Cardinal-Priest of Sant’Eusebio; Ordinary for the Austrian Ordinariate for the Faithful of Eastern Rites; Bishop of the Military Ordinariate of Austria
- Previous posts: Coadjutor Bishop of Sankt Pölten (1952–1956); Titular Bishop of Livias (1952–1956); President of the Secretariat of Non-Believers (1965–1980)

Orders
- Ordination: 29 October 1933 by Francesco Marchetti Selvaggiani
- Consecration: 31 August 1952 by Michael Memelauer
- Created cardinal: 15 December 1958 by Pope John XXIII
- Rank: Cardinal-Priest

Personal details
- Born: 3 August 1905 Sankt Pölten, Lower Austria, Austria-Hungary
- Died: 13 March 2004 (aged 98) Vienna, Austria
- Denomination: Roman Catholic
- Coat of arms

Styles of Franz König
- Reference style: His Eminence
- Spoken style: Your Eminence
- Religious style: Cardinal
- Informal style: Cardinal
- See: Vienna (Emeritus)

Franz König (3 August 1905 – 13 March 2004) was an Austrian Cardinal of the Catholic Church. He served as archbishop of Vienna from 1956 to 1985, and was elevated to the cardinalate in 1958. The last surviving cardinal elevated by Pope John XXIII, he was the longest-serving and second-oldest cardinal worldwide at the time of his death.

== Early life and ministry ==
König was born in Warth near Rabenstein, Lower Austria, as the oldest of the nine children of Franz and Maria König. He attended the Benedictine-run Stiftsgymnasium Melk and the Pontifical Gregorian University in Rome, where he received his doctorate in philosophy on 9 July 1930 and then his doctorate in theology on 21 January 1936. He also studied at the Pontifical German-Hungarian College, the Pontifical Biblical Institute, where he specialized in old Persian languages and religion, and the Université Catholique de Lille. During his studies in Rome he was in contact with Heinrich Maier, who later became the head of the very important resistance group against Nazi Germany.

Ordained as a priest on 29 October 1933 by Cardinal Francesco Marchetti-Selvaggiani, he originally served as a chaplain and teacher during World War II, his main concern at that time being youth ministry. Following this, König pursued an academic career, being appointed Privatdozent, later teaching religion at the College of Krems and the University of Vienna (1945–1948) and moral theology at the University of Salzburg (1948–1952).

On 3 July 1952, he was appointed Coadjutor Bishop of Sankt Pölten and Titular Bishop of Livias by Pope Pius XII. König received his episcopal consecration on the following 31 August from Bishop Michael Memelauer, with Bishops Leo Pietsch and Franz Zauner serving as co-consecrators.

== Archbishop of Vienna ==
Remaining as Coadjutor Bishop for just under four years, he was named the fourteenth Archbishop of Vienna, succeeding Theodor Innitzer. König was created Cardinal-Priest of Sant'Eusebio by Pope John XXIII in the consistory of 15 December 1958. This was an unexpected action on the part of John XXIII, who had been advised to withhold the red hat from König due to the unclear legal situation of the Church in Austria: the Austrian coalition government, on the insistences of Social Democratic Party ministers, refused to accept the concordat negotiated between the Holy See and Chancellor Engelbert Dollfuss's Austrofascist government.

After meeting personally with König, John XXIII decided that, "I have a different opinion. I will put you on my list and you will find a solution". By 1958 the newly appointed Cardinal König had managed to convince the authorities in Austria to recognise the earlier regulations in a new treaty, which was signed in 1961. In 1964 he founded the organization Pro Oriente, to promote the relationship between the Catholic and Orthodox churches.

After the first meeting between Church and Freemasonry which had been held on 11 April 1969 at the convent of the Divine Master in Ariccia, he was the protagonist of a series of public handshakes between high prelates of the Roman Catholic Church and the heads of Freemasonry.

König was appointed Bishop for the Catholic military ordinariate of Austria on 21 February 1959, a position he resigned on 27 June 1980. He has also served as President of the Austrian Episcopal Conference.

Within the Church, König worked to ensure a diverse communion that was united despite the apparent differences, with König himself holding both conservative and liberal viewpoints.

König was an elector in three conclaves: 1963 and the two conclaves of 1978, and played a pivotal role in the second conclave of 1978. The two top candidates, conservative Giuseppe Siri and liberal Giovanni Benelli, both faced too much opposition to win the papacy. When the emerging compromise candidate, Giovanni Colombo, announced that he would decline if elected, König proposed an unorthodox alternative for a church that had not had a pope from outside Italy in 455 years: Polish archbishop Karol Wojtyła, who was then elected and would reign as Pope John Paul II for 26 years.

== Views ==
=== Ecumenism and Interfaith ===
He was mainly concerned with questions of ecumenism, however also serving as president of the Vatican Secretariat for Non-Believers (which in 1993 was united with the Pontifical Council for Culture) from 6 April 1965 until his resignation on 27 June 1980.

He was an advocate of reform at the Second Vatican Council (1962–1965), serving on its preparatory commissions and greatly contributing to its declaration on non-Christian religions, Nostra aetate.

=== Communism and the Church ===
König swiftly made it his ambition to ensure that Communism and the Catholic Church were capable of co-existing peacefully. Quickly establishing himself as an important authority on the matter, he was often asked by the Vatican to make diplomatic trips to Communist countries, often establishing useful relationships with Communist authorities. It was König's determination that motivated him to promote Archbishop of Kraków Karol Wojtyła, who was elected Pope John Paul II, as a candidate in the conclave of October 1978, seeing it as vitally important that a cardinal from Eastern Europe be put forward for election. Using his authority, he was also able to convince the communist Romanian government to end the 11-year home imprisonment of Áron Márton, Transylvanian Bishop, in 1967.

=== Abortion ===
He opposed Austrian legislation on abortion, whilst at the same time describing the publication of Pope Paul VI's encyclical condemning contraception, Humanae vitae, as being a "tragic event".

=== Church in Hungary ===
The first Catholic prelate to visit Cardinal József Mindszenty at the American Embassy in Budapest, König afterwards visited the cardinal several times until Mindszenty's departure for Rome in 1971. He also convinced Mindszenty not to march out of the embassy after the American government began talks with the Hungarian government.

=== Relations with the Pope ===
Despite securing the election of John Paul II, his relations with the Holy See turned somewhat sour toward the end of his tenure as Archbishop of Vienna. König criticized the Pope for refusing to engage with what he considered "the spirit of progress that the Second Vatican Council had developed" and disagreed with what he perceived to be an overly centralised Church and too much control in the hands of the Roman Curia. The Curia also appeared to display hostility toward König, refusing to back his suggested candidate for Archbishop of Vienna—Bishop Helmut Krätzl, an auxiliary bishop of Vienna. Instead he was ordered by the nuncio to add Hans Hermann Groër onto the terna, or list of candidates.

=== Relations with his successor ===
He resigned his post in Vienna on 16 September 1985 and was succeeded by Groër, whose appointment König had questioned, although König did serve as Groër's principal consecrator. Groër, who became a cardinal, was later removed from office by John Paul II for sexual misconduct. After Groër's troubles came to light, König once again pressed for Krätzl to be appointed Archbishop of Vienna, however his advice was again ignored.

=== Pacifism ===
Until his death, Cardinal König was active in the Archdiocese of Vienna. Following his retirement from service as the Archbishop of Vienna, König stepped up his commitment to establishing peace, acting as International President of Pax Christi, an international Catholic peace promoting organisation, from 1990 to 1995.

== Later life and death ==
In 1990 he was one of the founders of the European Academy of Sciences and Arts in Salzburg/Austria.

In 1998, Cardinal Aloysius Stepinac, whom König had befriended during his studies in Rome, was beatified. (Years earlier, König had been involved in a near fatal car accident while traveling to Cardinal Stepinac's funeral.)

In 2003, while on holiday, König had a bad fall and fractured his hip. However, after being operated on, he made a speedy recovery and a few months later celebrated Mass again, only supported by his bishop's staff.

König died in his sleep at around 3:00 am on 13 March 2004 in a Viennese convent, at age 98. He was buried on the following 27 March in the Memorial Chapel Mausoleum Crypt Columbarium of Cathedral of St. Stephen.

== Honours (selection) ==
- Honorary doctor of the University of Vienna, 1963
- Member of the American Academy of Arts and Sciences, 1966
- Honorary citizen of the City of Vienna, 1968
- Honorary doctor of the University of Salzburg, 1972
- Austria: Grand Decoration of Honour in Gold with Sash, 1995
- Poland: Grand Cross of the Order of Merit, 1998
- Hungary: Grand Cross of the Order of Merit, 1999
- Slovakia: Grand Cross of the Order of the White Double Cross, 2000
- Naming of the Kardinal-König-Platz (square) in Vienna-Hietzing, 2005
- Naming of the Kardinal-Franz-König-Brücke (street bridge) in Scheibbs, Lower Austria, 2005

Catholic Church titles
| Preceded by Theodor Innitzer | Archbishop of Vienna; 1956–1985 | Succeeded by Hans Hermann Groër |
| Preceded by Luigi Bettazzi | International President of Pax Christi; 1985–1990 | Succeeded by Godfried Danneels |
| Preceded by Giuseppe Siri | Cardinal Protopriest; 1989–2004 | Succeeded by Stephen Kim |
