= Sigismund Anton von Hohenwart =

Austrian Prince-Archbishop and bishop

His Grace Sigismund Anton von Hohenwart
- Prince-Archbishop of Vienna
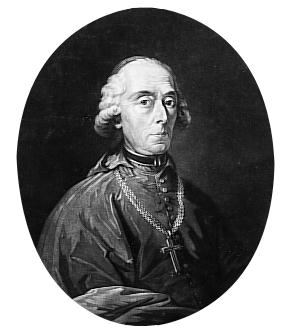
- Portrait by Josef Abel, 1794
- Church: Roman Catholic Church
- Archdiocese: Vienna
- See: St. Stephen's Cathedral
- Installed: 20 June 1803
- Term ended: 29 June 1820
- Predecessor: Christoph Anton Migazzi
- Successor: Leopold Maximilian von Firmian
- Other posts: Bishop of St. Pölten; Bishop of Trieste

Personal details
- Born: 2 May 1730 Gerlachstein, Carniola, Austria, Holy Roman Empire
- Died: 30 June 1820 (aged 90) Vienna, Austrian Empire

Sigismund Anton Graf von Hohenwart, S.J. (2 May 1730 – 30 June 1820) was from 1791 to 1794 Bishop of Trieste, from 1794 to 1803 Bishop of St. Pölten, and from 1803 to 1820 he was Prince-Archbishop of Vienna.

== Biography ==
Von Hohenwart was born in Gerlachstein, Carniola. He entered the Jesuit Order in 1746, studied theology in Graz, was a professor in Trieste and Ljubljana, and completed his studies in theology in 1758. In 1759 he was ordained a priest. From 1761 he taught at the Theresian Academy in Vienna and was from 1778 teacher of Emperor Francis II and his brothers in Florence. In 1791, he became the Bishop of Trieste and, in 1794, Bishop of St. Pölten. He received episcopal consecration from the Bishop of Ljubljana, Michel Leopold Brigido von Marenfels und Bresoviz, on 23 October 1791. From 1792 to 1803 he was also Apostolic Field Vicar.

On 29 April 1803, his former pupil, Francis II, appointed him Archbishop of Vienna, with confirmation taking place on 20 June.

He was a benevolent and learned church prince and conducted many visitations in his diocese. He endeavored to provide a good education for the students in the seminary. He promoted the admission of Redemptorists and Mechitarists in Vienna and supported Klemens Maria Hofbauer.

He was an opponent of Napoleon and signed reluctantly in 1809 a pastoral letter inviting Austrian priests to return to their parishes. On 11 March 1810, he took in the Augustinian Church before the church wedding of Marie Louise with Napoleon, who was represented by Archduke Charles.

He died in Vienna, where he is buried in the bishop's crypt of St. Stephen's Cathedral.

== Bibliography ==
- "Hohenwart Sigmund Anton Gf. von". In: Österreichisches Biographisches Lexikon 1815–1950 (ÖBL). Vol. 2, Austrian Academy of Sciences, Vienna 1959, p. 397.
- Friedrich Wilhelm Bautz (1990). "Sigismund Anton von Hohenwart". In Bautz, Friedrich Wilhelm (ed.). Biographisch-Bibliographisches Kirchenlexikon (BBKL) (in German). Vol. 2. Hamm: Bautz. cols. 993–994. ISBN 3-88309-032-8.
- Günther Böing: Hohenwart, Graf Sigismund Anton. In: Lexikon für Theologie und Kirche. 5. Band. 2. Auflage, Herder, Freiburg i. B. 1960.
- Franz Loidl: Geschichte des Erzbistums Wien. Herold, Wien 1983, ISBN 3-7008-0223-4.
- Ernst Tomek: Kirchengeschichte Österreichs. Tyrolia, Innsbruck - Wien - München 1935-59.
- Josef Wodka: Kirche in Österreich. Wegweiser durch ihre Geschichte. Herder, Wien 1959.
- "Sigismund Anton Graf von Hohenwart". Biographisches Lexikon des Kaiserthums Oesterreich. Vol. 9. pp. 208–210.
