= Sankt Pölten Cathedral =

Coordinates: 48.2051°N 15.6272°E

- Cathedral of the Assumption of Mary, Sankt Pölten
- Dom Mariä Himmelfahrt
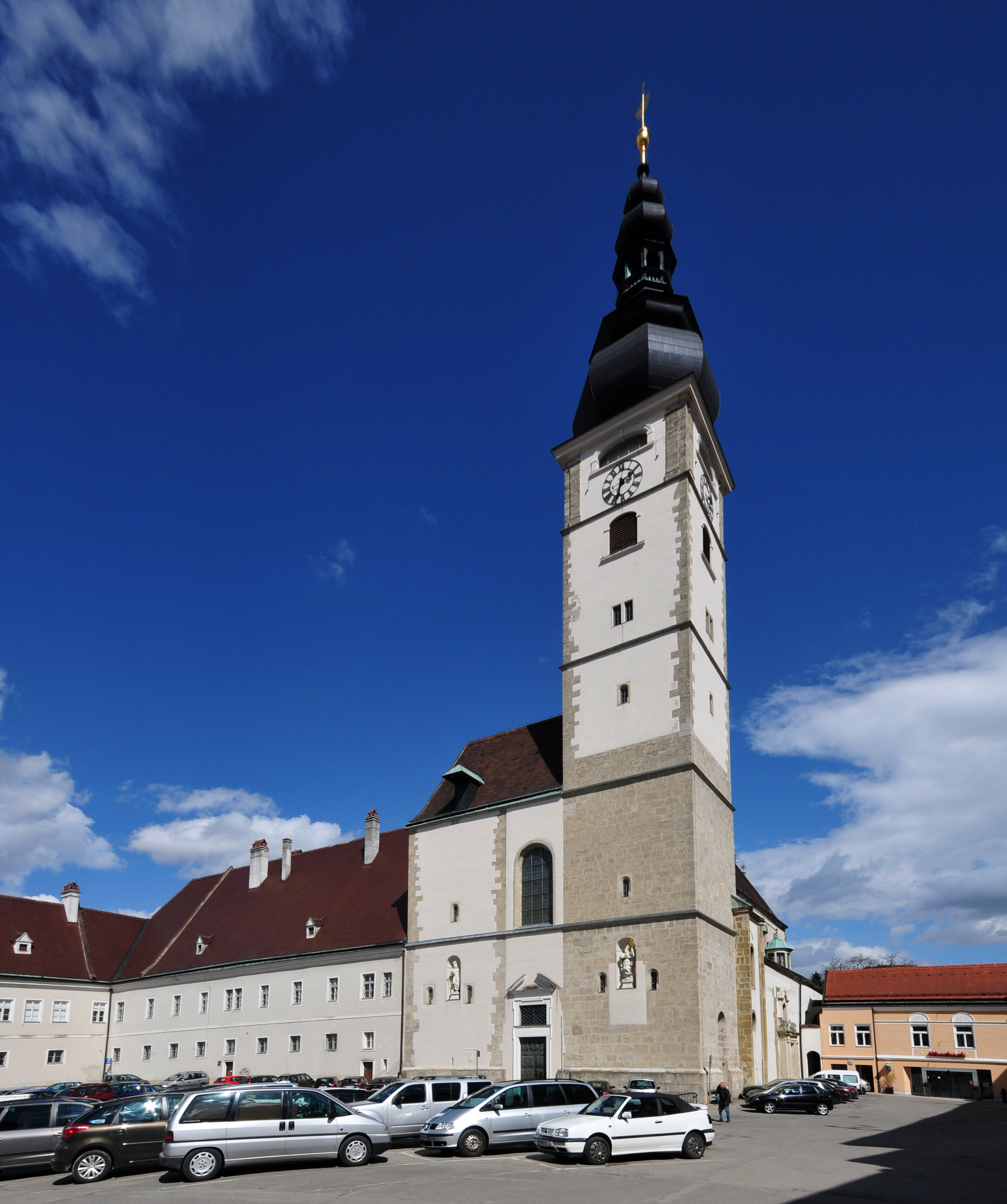
- Location: Sankt Pölten
- Country: Austria
- Denomination: Roman Catholic Church

Sankt Pölten Cathedral (German: Dom Mariä Himmelfahrt) dedicated to the Assumption of the Blessed Virgin Mary, is a Roman Catholic cathedral in Sankt Pölten, Lower Austria. It has been the episcopal seat of the Diocese of Sankt Pölten in Austria since 1785, having previously been the church of the Augustinian Abbey of St. Pölten, dissolved in 1784. The building, despite being a well-preserved late Romanesque structure, is Baroque in appearance.

The use of the site for religious buildings is believed to date from around 790, when a Benedictine monastery was established here, to which were brought the relics of Saint Hippolytus, after whom the present city is named. In 828, the monastery became a possession of the Diocese of Passau, and a centre of missionary activity, predominantly in Great Moravia. After the invasion of the Magyars in around 907, the monastery was almost entirely destroyed, and was not rebuilt until after the Battle of Lechfeld in 955. The first documentary reference is in a charter of 976 from Emperor Otto II to Bishop Pilgrim of Passau.

Under Bishop Altmann of Passau the abbey became an Augustinian canonry, which was dissolved in 1784 as part of the Josephine Reforms.

In around 1150, the abbey church was rebuilt with three naves but no transept, with a westwork including two towers. In 1228 Bishop Gebhard changed the dedication, formerly to Saints Peter, Stephen and Hippolytus, to the Assumption of Mary. After a fire it was rebuilt again between 1267 and 1280. After another fire in 1621 the entire building was re-cast in the present Baroque style.
