= Wiener Neustadt Cathedral =

Coordinates: 47.8150°N 16.2425°E

- Cathedral of the Assumption of Mary and St. Rupert, Wiener Neustadt
- Dom Mariä Himmelfahrt und Sankt Rupert
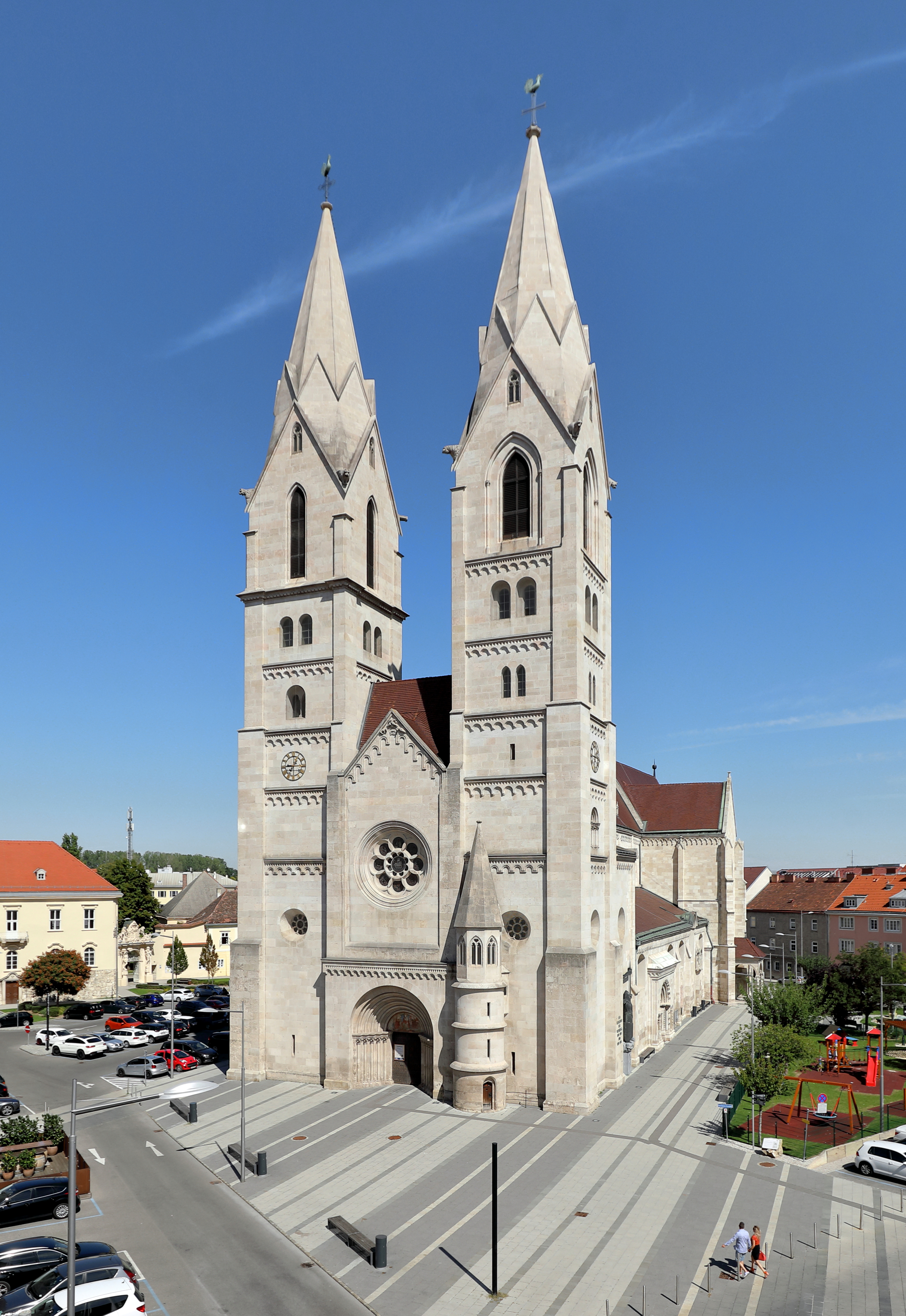
- Wiener Neustadt Cathedral
- Location: Wiener Neustadt
- Country: Austria
- Denomination: Catholic Church

Administration
- Diocese: Diocese of Wiener Neustadt
- Parish: Dompfarre

Wiener Neustadt Cathedral, or the Cathedral of the Assumption of Mary and St. Rupert (German: Wiener Neustädter Dom; Dom Mariä Himmelfahrt und Sankt Rupert), is a Catholic church located in Wiener Neustadt, Austria. Now a parish church, it was previously the cathedral of the Diocese of Wiener Neustadt from 1468 to 1785, when the diocese was suppressed.

The nave faces north and west in alignment with sunrise on the day of Pentecost on May 24, 1192, when Duke Leopold V was invested by Emperor Henry VI. In 1207 the construction of the Romanesque church began. It was consecrated in 1279.

From 1588 to 1630, Melchior Klesl was the administrator of the diocese; he had the first Baroque pulpit built. The Baroque altar with the altarpiece of the Assumption of Mary by Giandomenico Cignaroli was fitted in 1776. In 1886 the westwork and its towers were demolished because of damage from an earthquake; they were reconstructed from 1892 to 1899. Austro-Hungarian Emperor Franz Josef attended the ceremony when the towers were complete.

On March 6, 2012, a fire set by an arsonist forced the cathedral to close for six months for repairs.

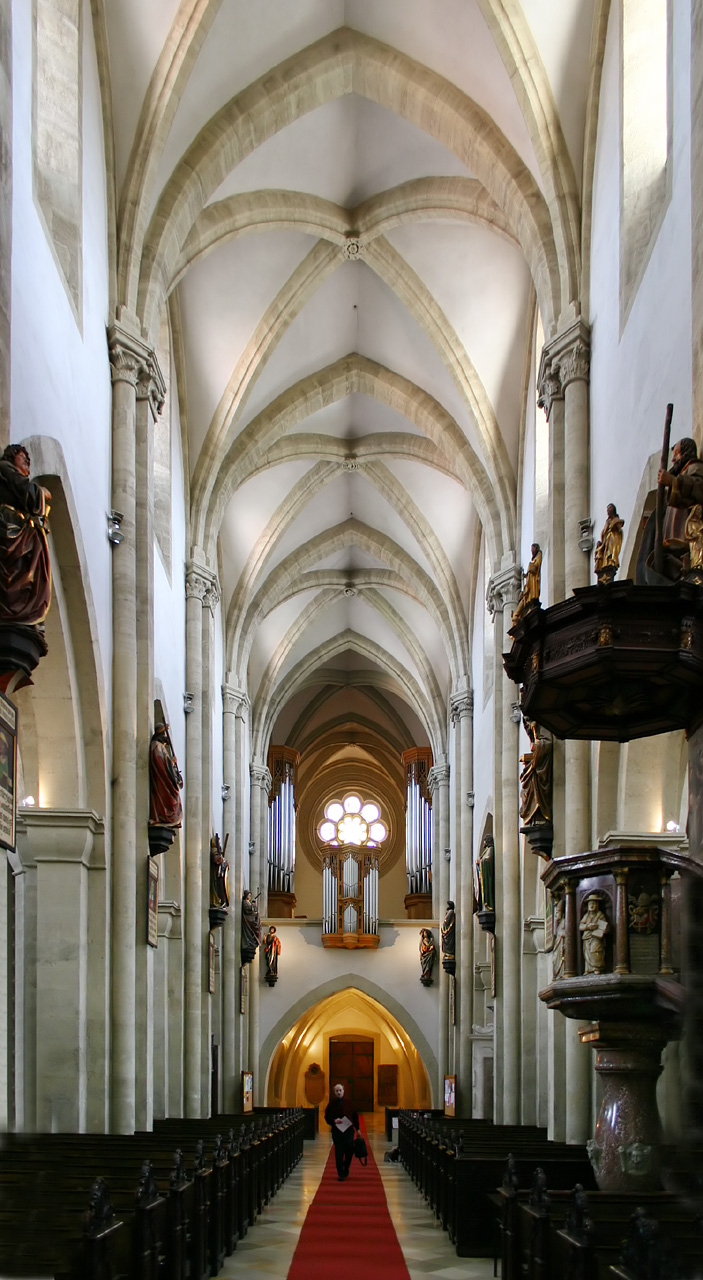

== See also ==
- St. George's Cathedral, Wiener Neustadt
