= Roman Catholic Diocese of Wiener Neustadt =

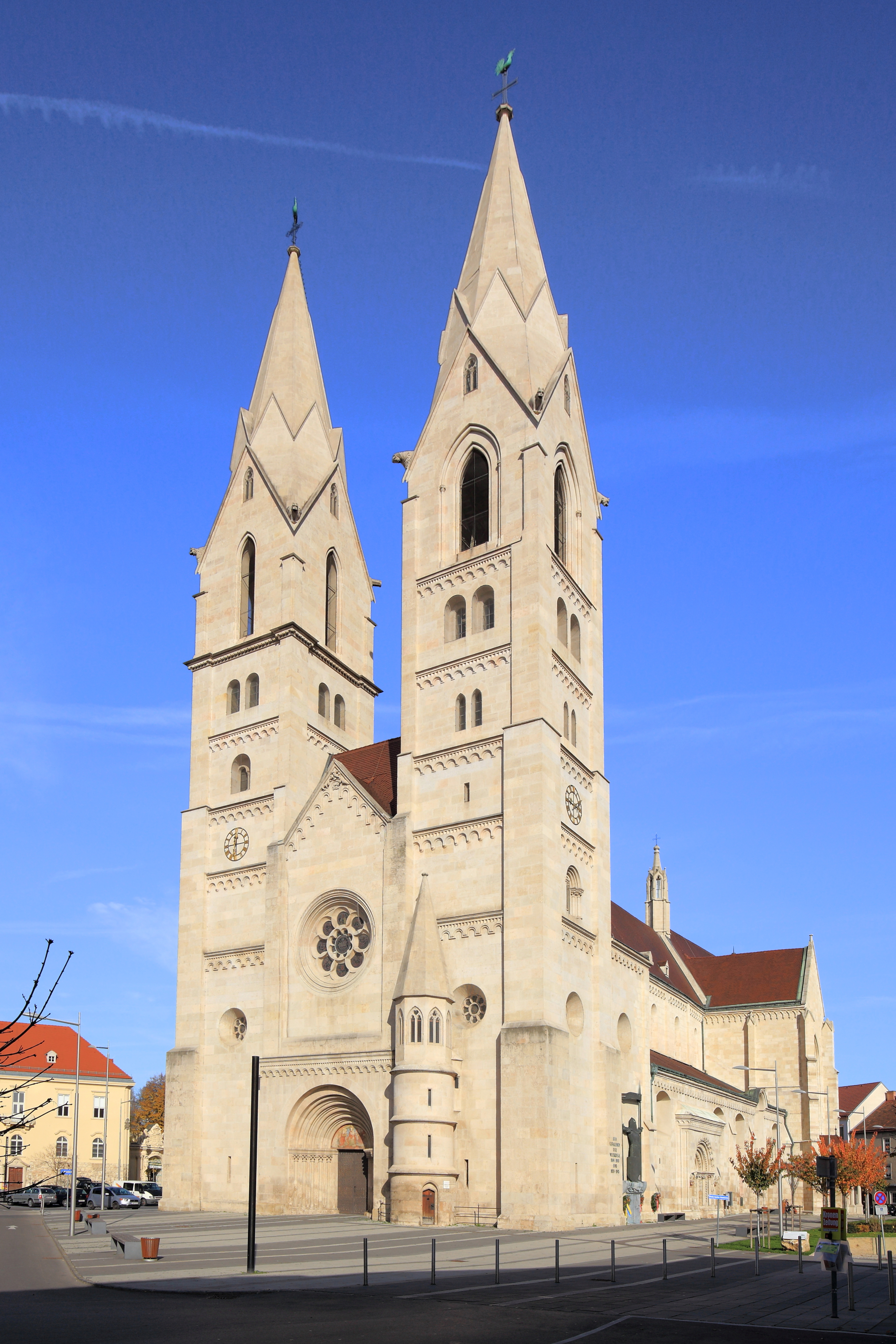
Wiener Neustadt Cathedral

The former Diocese of Wiener Neustadt in Lower Austria existed from 1469 to 1785. In 1990, it was re-established as a titular see which is held by the bishop for the Military Services in Austria.

== History ==
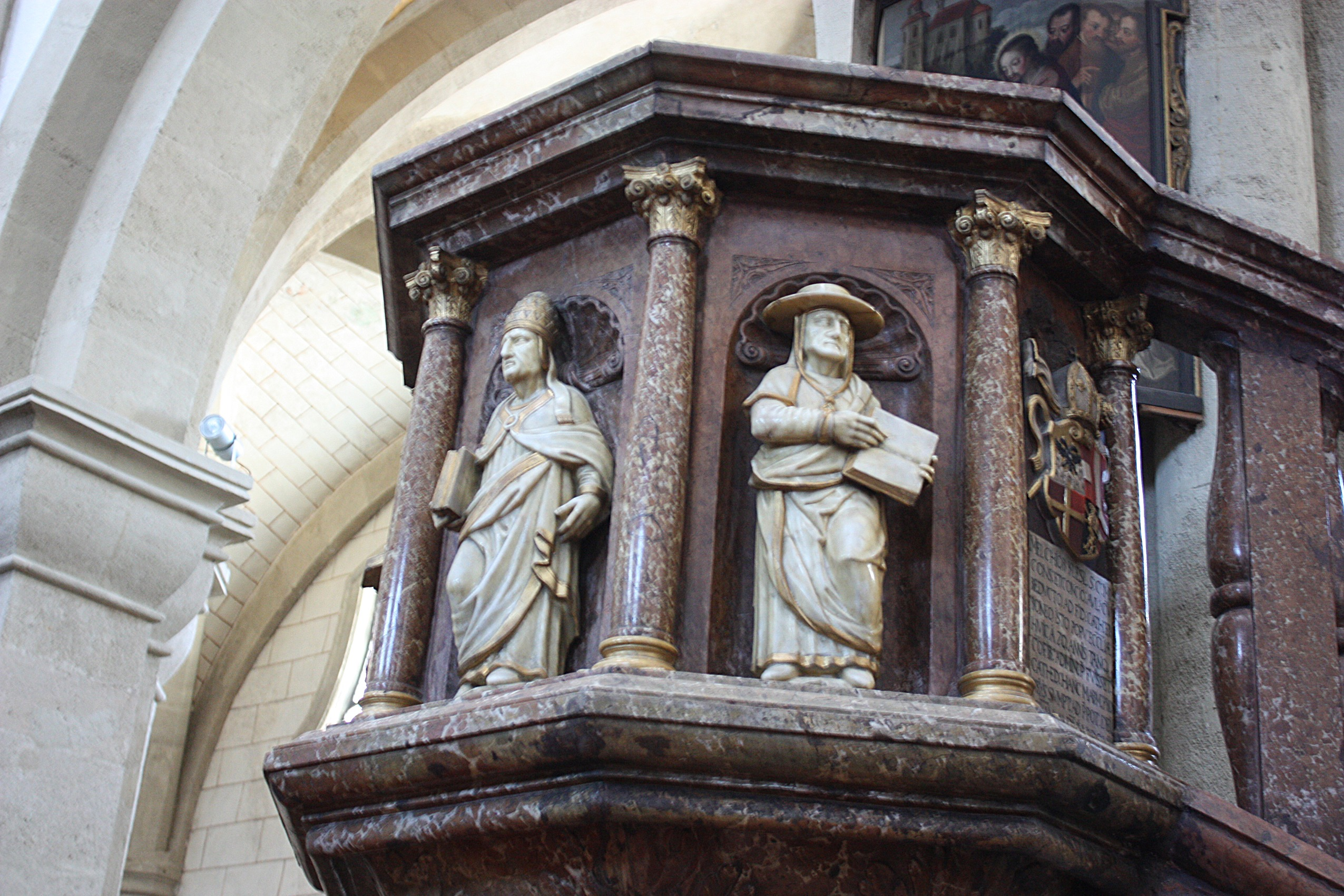
Detail of pulpit, Wiener Neustadt Cathedral

Upon the request of the Emperor Frederick III, the diocese was created by Pope Paul II on 14 January 1469, and was immediately subject to the Holy See. At first it was coterminous with the town of Wiener Neustadt.

In 1769 the new parish of Theresienfeld was added and in 1784 its territory was extended from Wiener-Neustadt to the boundary of Styria. On 21 April 1785, the see was incorporated in the Archdiocese of Vienna by Emperor Joseph II. Its last bishop, Johann Heinrich von Kerens, S.J. (1775–1785), and his cathedral chapter were transferred to the newly erected Diocese of Sankt Pölten.

== Cathedral ==
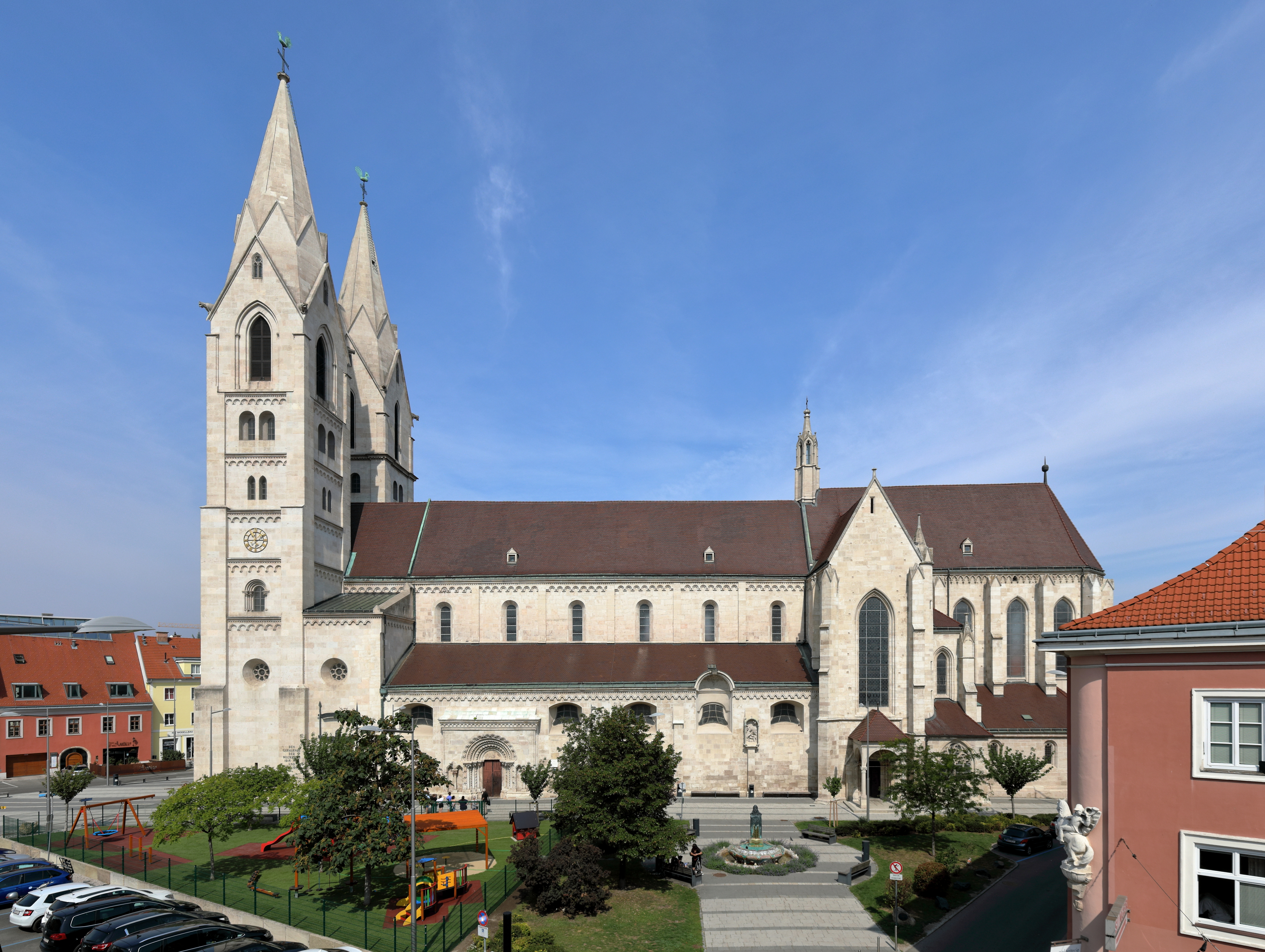
The cathedral

The Late-Romanesque Dom or cathedral was consecrated in 1279 and remained the cathedral from 1469 to 1785. The choir stalls and transept, in Gothic style, are from the 14th century. In the late 15th century 12 statues of the Apostles were added in the apse, while the bust of Cardinal Melchior Klesl is attributed to Gian Lorenzo Bernini.

== Diocesan Bishops ==
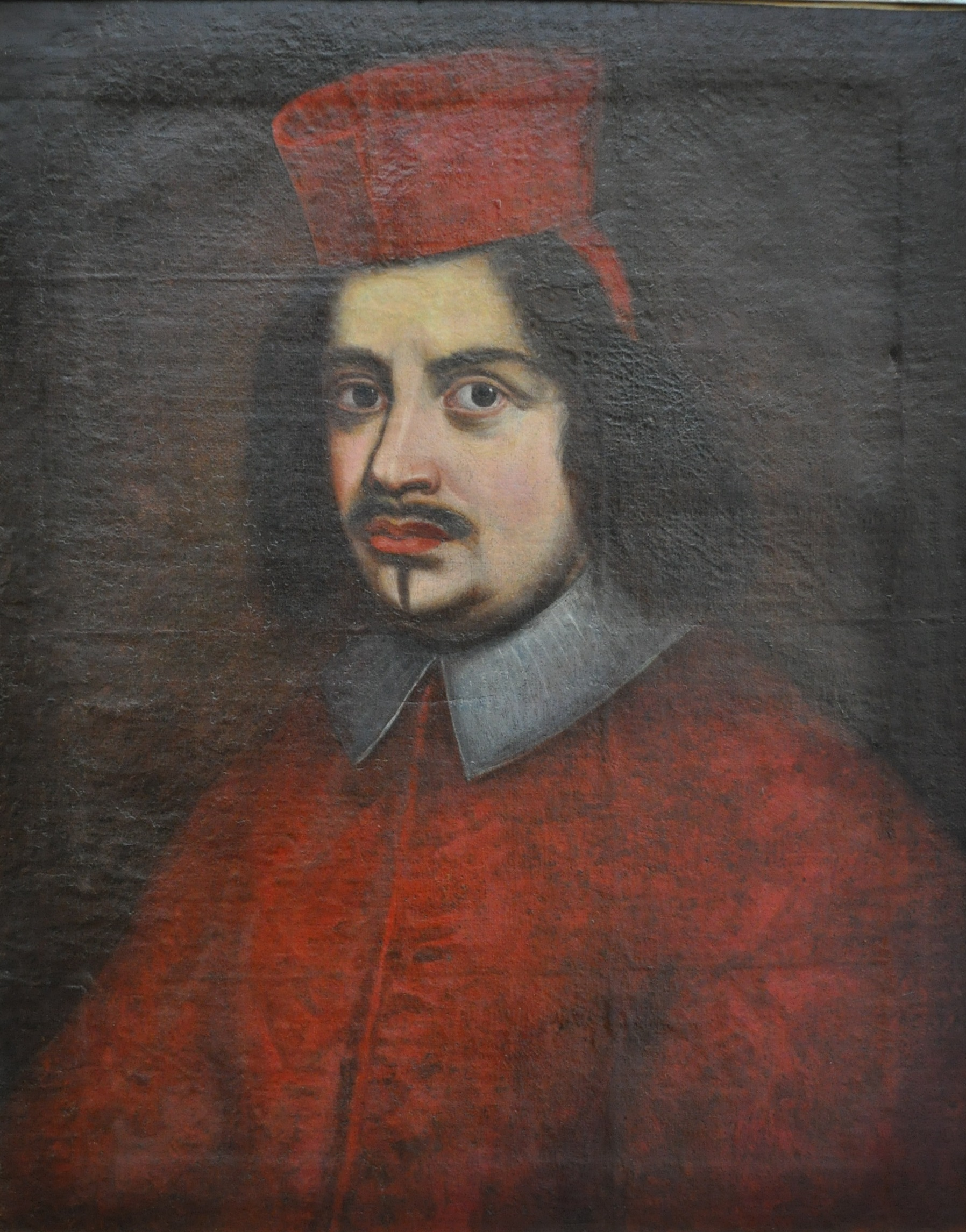
Leopold von Kollonitsch.

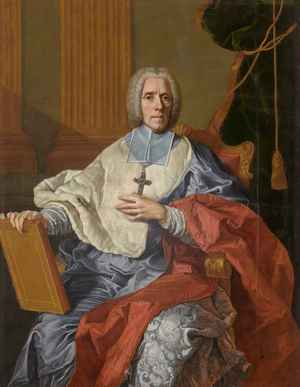
Blankenheim

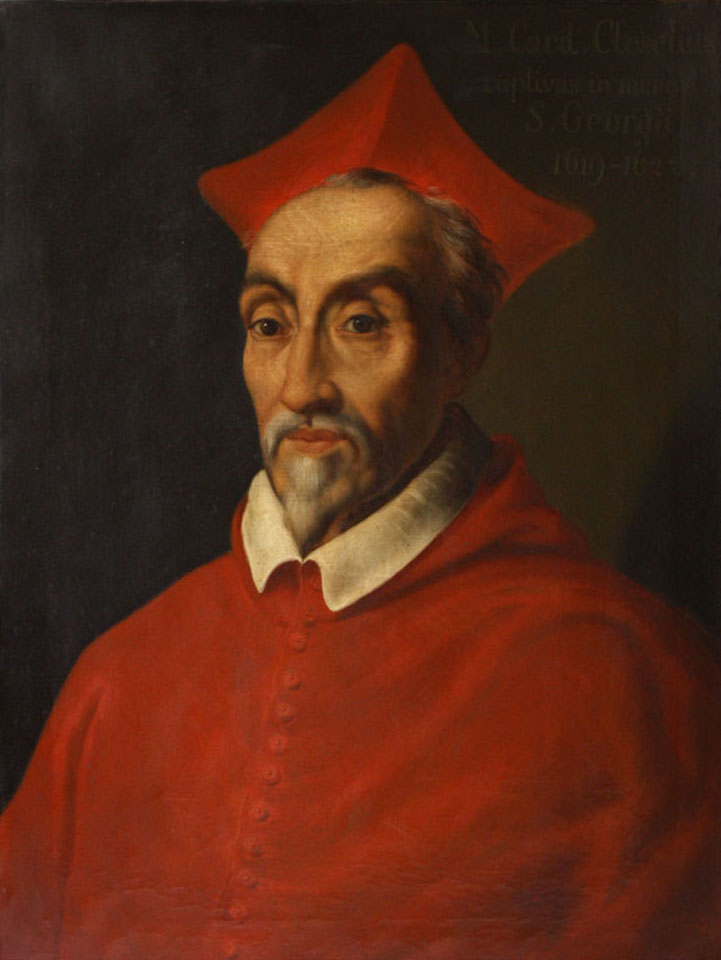
Melchior Klesl

- Michael Altkind (Apostolic Administrator 1469–1475)
- Petrus Engelprecht (1476–1491)
- Augustin Kiebinger (1491–1495)
- Theoderich Kammerer (1521–1530)
- Johann Fabri (Coadjutor bishop 1524–1530)
- Gregor Angerer (1531–1548)
- Heinrich Muelich (1549–1550)
- Christoph Wertwein (Apostolic Administrator 1550–1553)
- Franz Abstemius (1555–1558)
- Martin Durlacher (1558–1559)
- Kaspar von Logau (1560–1562)
- Christian Napponäus (1564–1571)
- Lambert Gruter (1572–1582)
- Martin Radwiger (1587–1588)
- Melchior Khlesl (Apostolic Administrator 1588–1630; also Bishop of Vienna and cardinal (1598–1630)
- Matthias Geißler (1631–1639)
- Johannes Thuanus (1639–1666)
- Laurenz Aidinger (1666–1669)
- Leopold Karl von Kollonitsch (1669–1686), later Bishop of Raab
- Christoph de Rojas y Spinola (1685–1695)
- Franz Anton von Puchheim (1695–1718)
- Ignaz von Lovina (1718–1720)
- Joseph Ignaz della Rovere (1720–1721)
- Johann Moritz Gustav von Manderscheid-Blankenheim (1721–1734), later Archbishop of Prague
- Johann Franz Anton von Khevenhüller (1734–1740)
- Ferdinand Michael Cyriakus von Hallweil (1741–1773)
- Johann Heinrich von Kerens (1773–1785), became first Bishop of Sankt Pölten

== Titular Bishops ==
- Alfred Kostelecky (1990–1994), bishop of the Military Ordinariate of Austria
- Christian Werner (1997–present), bishop of the Military Ordinariate of Austria

== Sources ==
- Wiedermann, Beitrage zur Gesch. des Bis. Wiener Neustadt, in Oesterreich, Vierteljahrsschrift fur kath. Theol. (Vienna, 1864–9).
- Catholic-Hierarchy: Diocese of Wiener Neustadt (Suppressed)
- Catholic-Hierarchy: Titular Bishops of Wiener Neustadt
- GCatholic.org: Military Ordinariate of Katholische Militärseelsorge Austria
