= Exemption (Catholic canon law) =

Ecclesiastical status within Catholic canon law

In the Catholic Church, an exemption is the full or partial release of an ecclesiastical person, corporation, or institution from the authority of the ecclesiastical superior next higher in rank. For example, the Archdiocese of Strasbourg and the Latin Patriarchate of Jerusalem are exempt, being directly subject to the Holy See.

See exempt dioceses for a list of exempt entities.

== Background ==
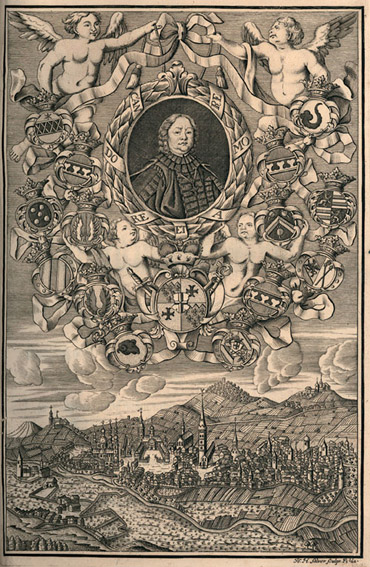
Abbot Adolf von Dalberg of Fulda, an Imperial abbey that was both exempt and immediate

Originally, according to canon law, all the residents of a diocese, as well as all diocesan institutions, were under the authority of the local bishop. Following complaints by monasteries that bishops treated them oppressively, they were taken under the protection of synods, princes and popes. Papal protection often evolved later into exemption from episcopal authority. From the 11th century onward, papal activity in the matter of Church reform has often been the source of exemptions.

== Extent and scope of exemption ==
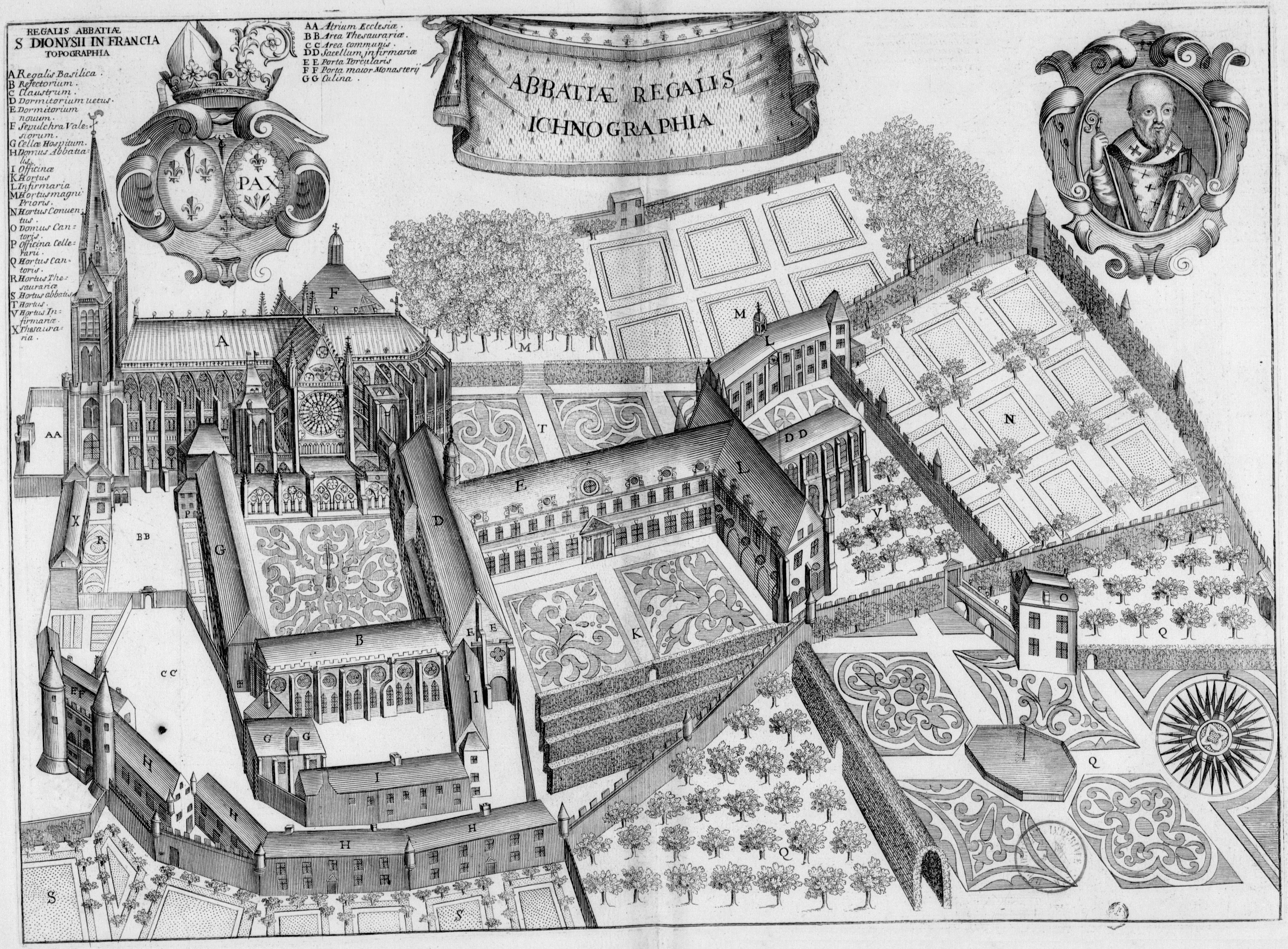
An exempt abbey: Abbaye Saint-Denis, near Paris

=== History ===
Eventually, not only individual monasteries, but also entire orders, were granted exemption from the authority of the local bishop. Exemptions were also granted to cathedral chapters, collegiate chapters, parishes, communities, ecclesiastical institutions, and even single individuals. In some cases, monasteries and churches which could document that from time immemorial they had never been subjected to the authority of a bishop could have their claim to exemption confirmed. Under these circumstances, the diocesan administration of the bishops was frequently crippled. Complaints and conflicts were frequent and councils were called upon to clarify and circumscribe the notion and scope of exemption.

Some bishops gained exemption from the authority of their metropolitan (archbishop), either at their own request or by decision of the Holy See. However, those exempt bishops were required to choose an ecclesiastical province and attend the provincial synods.

In the case of monasteries and churches, exemption is known as either passiva or activa, the latter being the most extensive. Abbots known canonically as proelati nullius cum territorio separato exercised quasi episcopal rights over a clearly defined territory entirely distinct from the diocese. There was disagreement as to whether or not such exempt abbots could be required to attend provincial synods as their presence might eventually jeopardize the right of exemption of their monasteries.

The exemption enjoyed by female orders and religious houses was more restricted. The bishop or his representative presided over the election of the abbesses, prioresses, or superiors and they continued to have the right to visit canonically these houses. They also retained the right to supervise the observance of the clausura (cloister).

=== Second Vatican Council ===
The Second Vatican Council sought to clarify the meaning of exemption:

The institute of exemption, by which Religious are called to the service of the supreme pontiff or other ecclesiastical authority and withdrawn from the jurisdiction of bishops, refers chiefly to the internal order of their communities so that in them all things may be properly coordinated and the growth and perfection of the Religious common life promoted. These communities are also exempt so that the supreme pontiff can dispose of them for the good of the universal Church and any other competent authority for the good of the churches under its own jurisdiction.

The Decree added that "Religious in individual dioceses" remain subject to the jurisdiction of the diocesan bishop "insofar as the performance of their pastoral office and the right ordering of the care of souls requires", and that exempt and non-exempt religious were equally subject to their authority "in those things which pertain to the public exercise of divine worship ..., the care of souls, the sacred preaching intended for the people, the religious and moral education of the Christian faithful, especially of the children, catechetical instruction and liturgical formation", with an exception allowing for religious of different rites to celebrate the liturgy according to their own rite.

== See also ==
- List of exempt dioceses (Catholic Church)
- Royal peculiar
- Stauropegion
