= Diocese of Sankt Pölten =

Catholic ecclesiastical territory

Coordinates: 48.2056°N 15.6280°E

Diocese of Sankt Pölten Dioecesis Sancti Hippolyti Diözese St. Pölten

Catholic
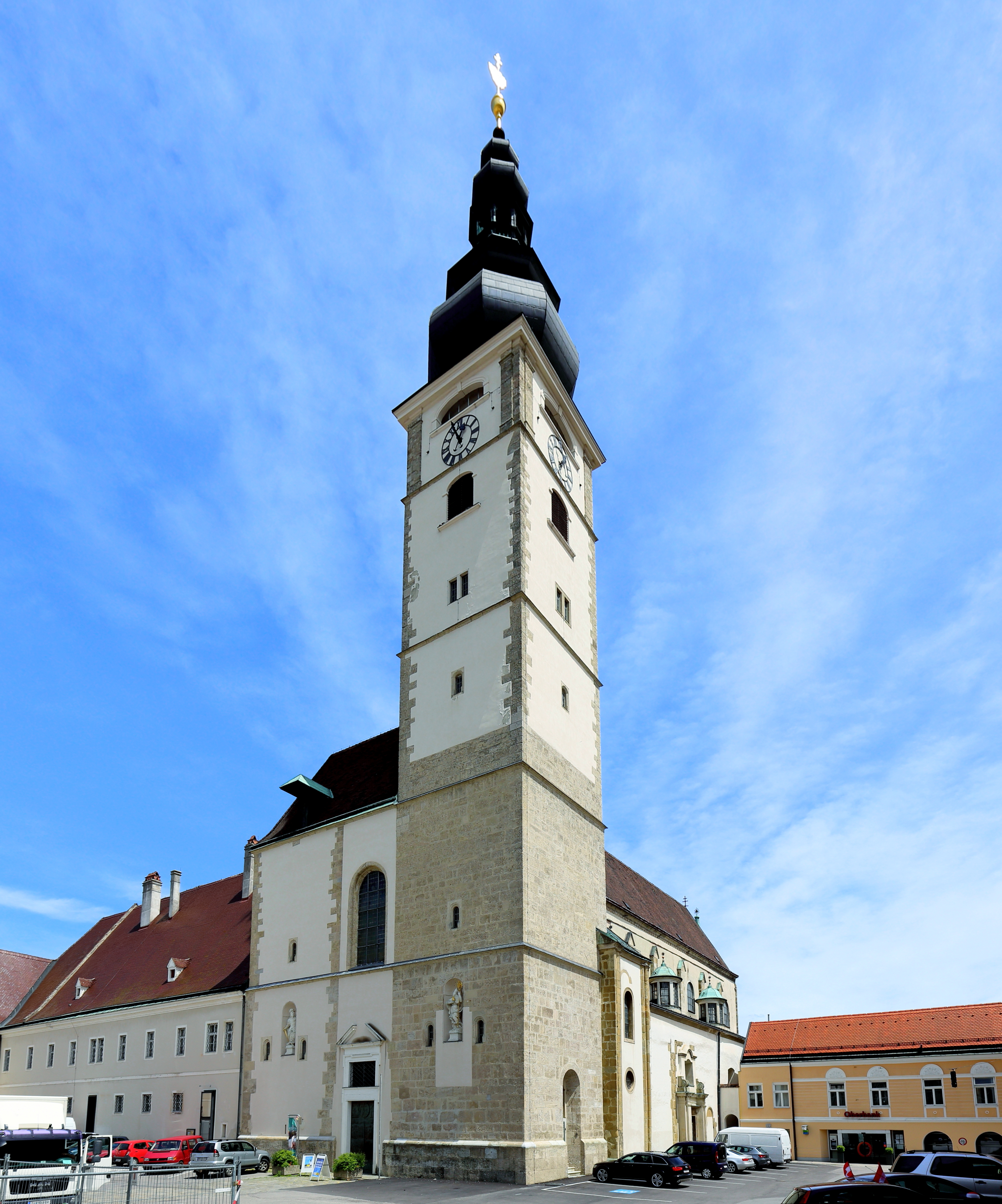
- Sankt Pölten Cathedral; Dom Mariä Himmelfahrt (Cathedral of the Assumption of Mary)

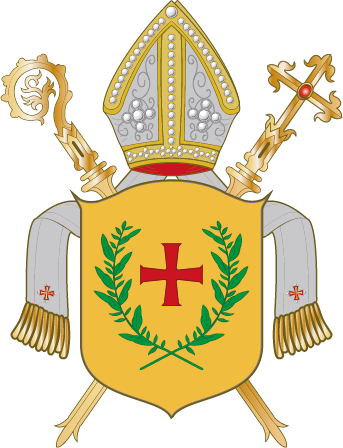
- Coat of arms

Location
- Country: Austria
- Territory: Lower Austria
- Ecclesiastical province: Archdiocese of Vienna
- Metropolitan: Sankt Pölten

Statistics
- Area: 10,450 km^{2} (4,030 sq mi)
- Population: Total; Catholics: (as of 2017); 629,000; 501,221 (79.7%)

Information
- Denomination: Roman Catholic
- Rite: Roman Rite
- Established: January 28, 1785
- Cathedral: Sankt Pölten Cathedral
- Patron saint: Saint Hippolyte

Current leadership
- Pope: Leo XIV
- Bishop: Alois Schwarz
- Metropolitan Archbishop: Josef Grünwidl
- Auxiliary Bishops: Anton Leichtfried
- Bishops emeritus: Klaus Küng

Map
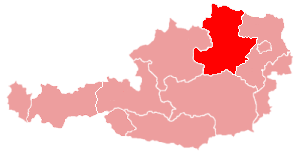

Website
- Website of the Diocese

The Diocese of Sankt Pölten (Latin: Dioecesis Sancti Hippolyti) is a Latin Church diocese located in the city of Sankt Pölten in the ecclesiastical province of Wien in Austria.

== History ==
- 28 January 1785: Established as Diocese of Sankt Pölten from the Diocese of Passau, Germany and Diocese of Wiener Neustadt

== Notable churches ==
- Minor Basilicas:
  - Basilika Maria Taferl, Maria Taferl, Niederösterreich
  - Basilika Unserer Lieben Frau, Geras, Niederösterreich
  - Hl. Dreifaltigkeit, Sonntagberg, Niederösterreich
  - Maria Dreieichen «ad tres Quercus», Dreieichen, Niederösterreich
  - Stift Lilienfeld, Lilienfeld, Niederösterreich

== Leadership ==
- Bishops of Sankt Pölten (Roman rite)
  - Bishop Alois Schwarz (since 2018.07.01)
  - Bishop Klaus Küng (2004.10.07 - 2018.07.01)
  - Bishop Kurt Krenn (1991.07.11 – 2004.10.07)
  - Bishop Franz Žak (1961.10.01 – 1991.07.11)
  - Bishop Michael Memelauer (1927.04.18 – 1961.09.30)
  - Bishop Johannes Baptist Rößler (1894.01.05 – 1927.01.04)
  - Bishop Matthäus Joseph Binder (1872.10.07 – 1893.08.14)
  - Bishop Joseph Feßler (1864.09.23 – 1872.04.23)
  - Bishop Ignaz Feigerle (1851.12.02 – 1863.09.27)
  - Bishop Anton Alois Buchmayer (1842.12.28 – 1851.09.02)
  - Bishop Michael Johann Wagner (1835.11.16 – 1842.10.23)
  - Bishop Johann Michael Leonhard (1835.02.20 – 1835.11.19)
  - Bishop Jakob Frint (1827.01.02 – 1834.10.11)
  - Bishop Joseph Chrysostomus Pauer (1823.11.10 – 1826.12.19)
  - Bishop Johann Nepomuk Ritter von Dankesreither (1816.06.30 – 1823.06.10)
  - Bishop Godfried Joseph Crüts van Creits (1806.03.14 – 1815.04.05)
  - Archbishop Sigismund Anton Graf von Hohenwart, S.J. (1794.01.10 – 1803.06.20)
  - Bishop Johann Heinrich von Kerens, S.J. (1785.02.14 – 1792.11.26)

== See also ==
- Roman Catholicism in Austria

== Links ==
- Diocesan website
