= Burg Wiener Neustadt =

Castle in Lower Austria, Austria

- Wiener Neustadt, Austria
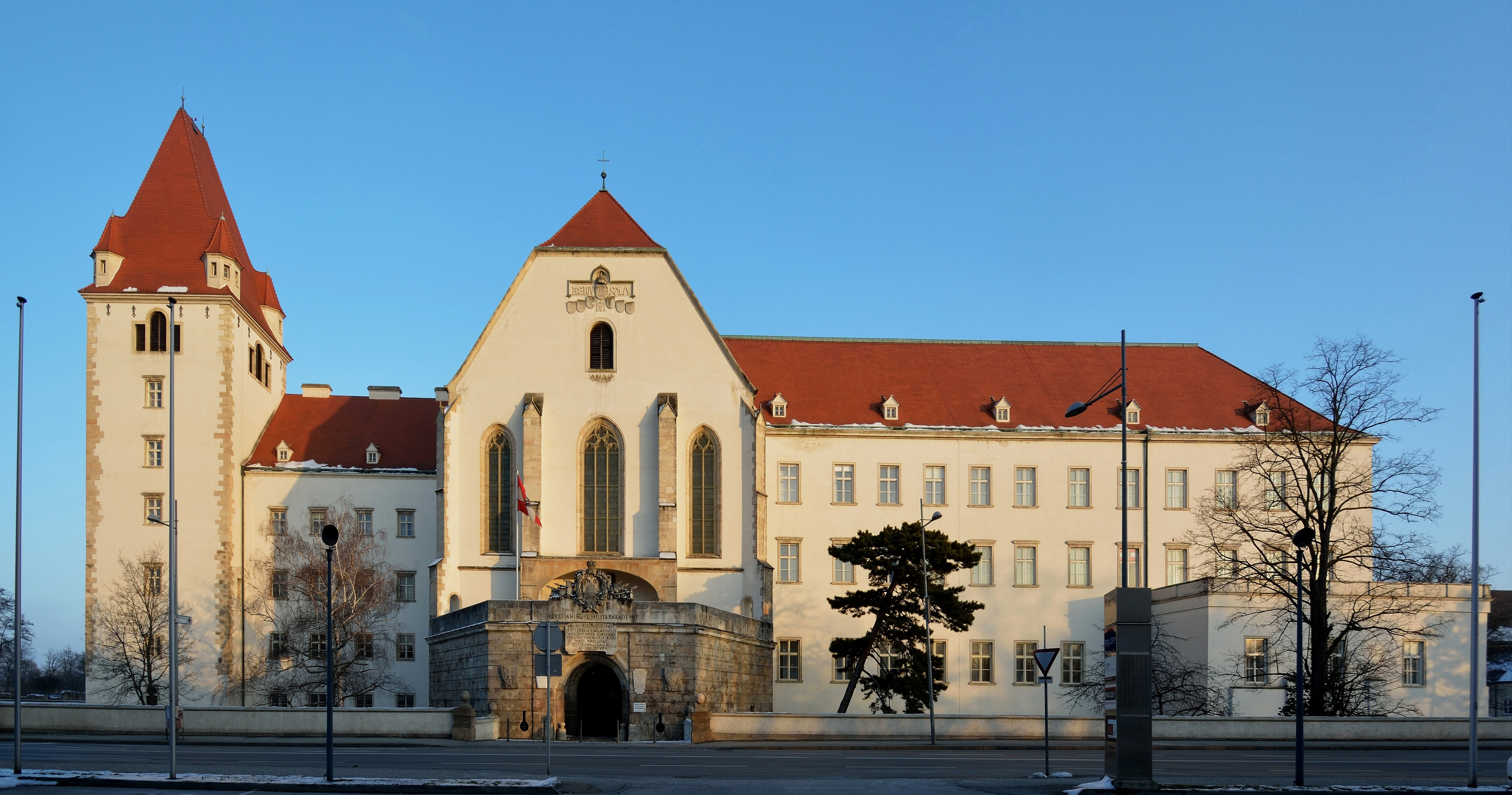
- Front of the building in 2014

Site information
- Type: Castle
- Owner: Republic of Austria
- Operator: Theresian Military Academy

Location
- Coordinates: 47°48′36″N 16°14′45″E

Site history
- Built: 13th century, then rebuilt many times
- Built by: Leopold VI, Duke of Austria

Burg Wiener Neustadt is a castle in the Austrian city of Wiener Neustadt in Lower Austria. It is the location of the Theresian Military Academy, which was founded in 1751. The site is 268 metres (879 ft) above sea level.

== History ==
The first castle at Wiener Neustadt was built in 1193–94, and the city walls were built at the same time. The costs were paid from the ransom of Richard the Lionheart. This castle is said to have stood on the north-eastern corner of the city, but there is no archaeological evidence of this.

When the original castle became too small, a new castle was built on the present site by Leopold VI the Glorious at the beginning of the 13th century. Since the area is quite marshy, it was built on wooden piles. Under Frederick II the Quarrelsome, it was finally surrounded by a moat, outer walls and towers.

In 1246, the Battle of the Leitha was fought east of the castle, and Frederick II was killed. A monument at Burgenland road still reminds of it. In 1260, the castle was first mentioned in documents. The wall was removed, however, under Otakar II of Bohemia by 1253 and then built up again in the late 13th century.

During an earthquake in 1348, the castle collapsed. This led to a larger new building under Leopold III starting in 1378. On the terrace that was built over the tomb chapel of Leopold IV, Peter Pusika on behalf of Duke Ernest the Iron built the Gottsleichnamkapelle (God's Body Chapel) and later, on behalf of Emperor Frederick III, the St. George's Chapel in the newly created west wing. In many places of the castle, the inscription “A.E.I.O.U.” can still be found, which dates back to Frederick III.

When Frederick III refused to dismiss Ladislaus the Posthumous from his guardianship, this led to the creation of the Mailberg Confederation (Mailberger Bund) and a siege of the castle in 1452 by an Estates' army of 16,000. After negotiations, Frederick III dismissed his ward. Subsequently, he founded the Order of St. George and made the castle available as the seat of the order. The seat, however, was repealed in 1598.

1486 saw a renewed siege by Matthias Corvinus, which ended after two years with the defenders' surrender. After Matthias' death in 1490, the occupation troops were expelled from the castle and city.

Under Emperor Maximilian I, the castle lost the status of permanent residence and became only a retreat of the emperor. Maximilian was buried in St. George's Chapel, although previously a tomb had been built in the Innsbruck Court Church.

In 1521, Emperor Ferdinand I retreated to the castle because of the resistance of the Protestant Estates. Subsequently, the Vienna city government was arrested, and they were brought to trial (Wiener Neustädter Blutgericht, i.e. Wiener Neustadt Bloody Trial) and executed here. Other celebrities were detained in a tower that was adapted as a state prison, the Rákócziturm (Rákóczi Tower), such as Francis II Rákóczi or Peter, Count Zrin.

During the first Turkish Siege of Vienna in 1529, the castle was attacked but not conquered. During the second siege in 1683, it was not attacked. In the years 1608 and 1616, fires caused major damage.

In 1743, 1400 French prisoners of war were detained in the castle. A little later, a pestilential epidemic broke out, which claimed many victims. The castle therefore remained closed (because of the risk of infection) for two years after the withdrawal of the survivors. Thereafter, it was hardly used and neglected.

=== Theresian Military Academy ===
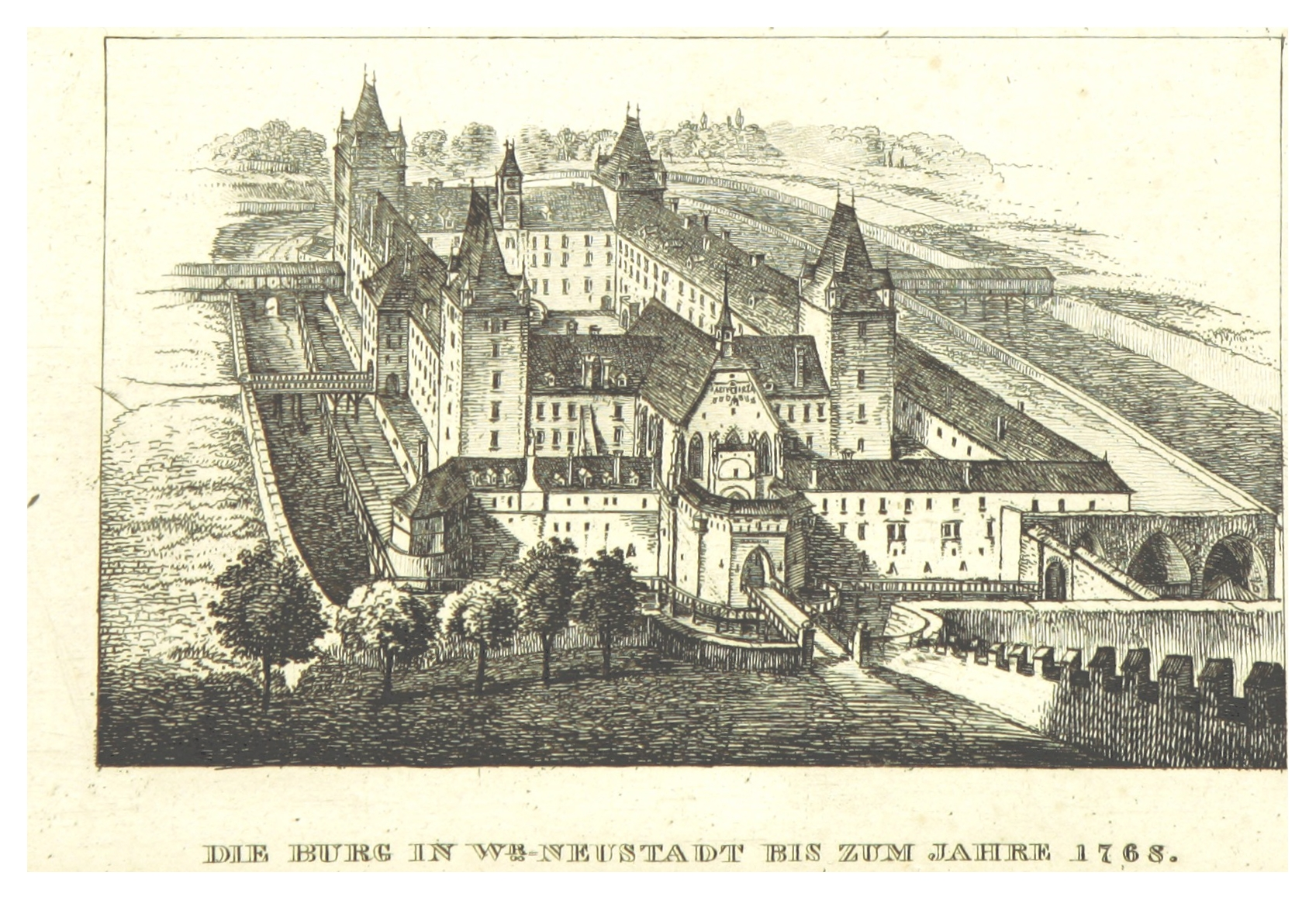
The castle before 1768

In 1751, the Theresian Military Academy was founded by Empress Maria Theresa and established in the castle. This involved numerous changes, which were implemented by Viennese architect Matthias Gerl. In 1768, an earthquake caused severe damage, which made the building uninhabitable. Three of the four towers had to be removed. In the east wing, new rooms were furnished for the emperor. In the place of God's Body Chapel, the main staircase was erected.

After World War I, the military academy was closed, but it reopened in 1934. During the bombings at the end of World War II in 1944–45, the castle (just like the city as a whole) was so badly damaged that only the outer walls remained standing. It was rebuilt after the war so that the military academy was able to resume operations in 1958.

The castle, which had always been the sovereign's property, is now owned by the Republic of Austria.

== Additional elements ==
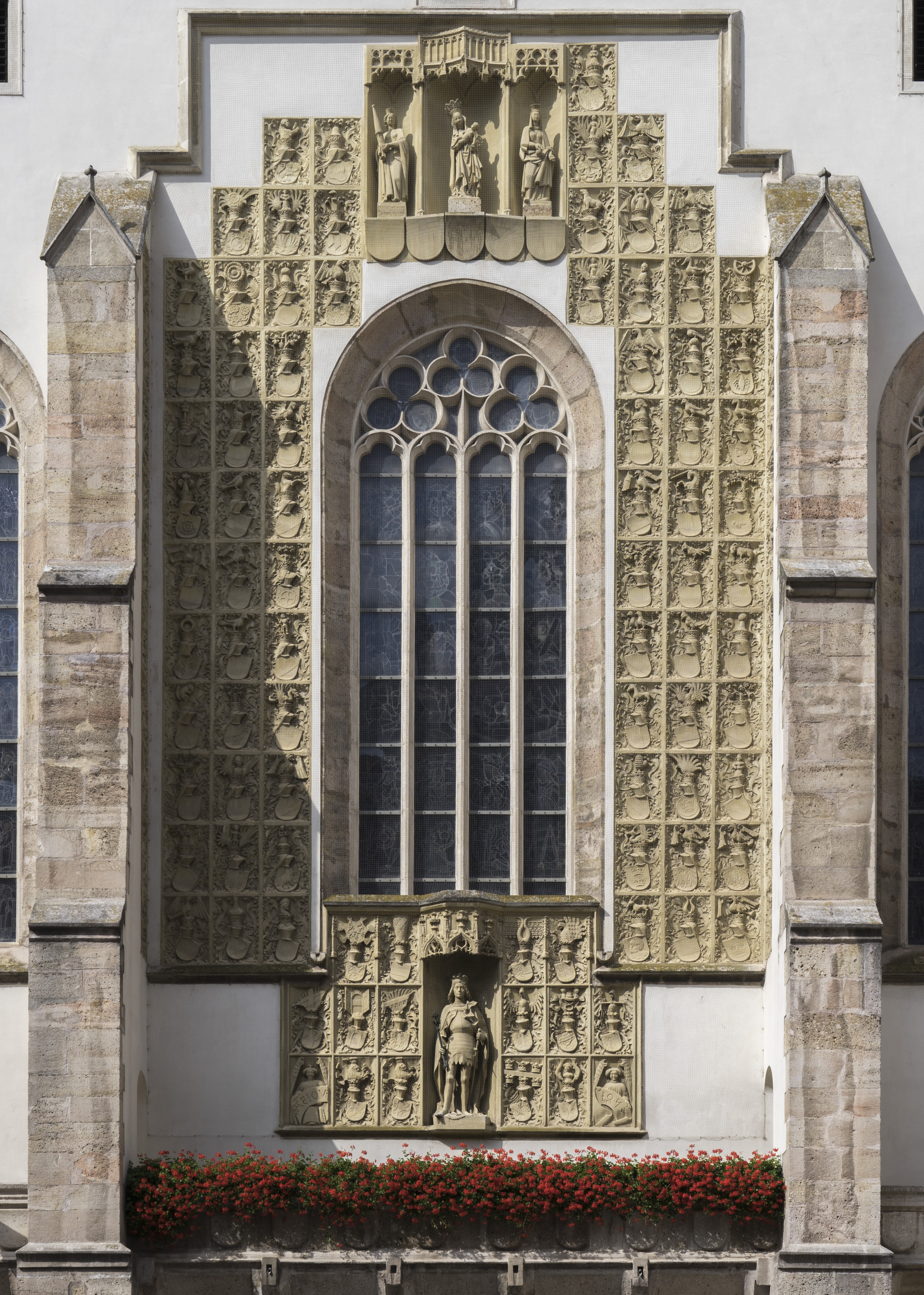
Wappenwand (wall of coats of arms) of cathedral

=== St. George's Cathedral ===
The St. George's Cathedral is a late Gothic hall church with three naves. It was created by Peter von Pusica and was built in the years 1440 to 1460.

The original chapel was called St. Mary's or Our Lady's Chapel. Under Frederick III, it was renamed to St. George's Chapel as the seat of the Knights of St. George's Order.

The chapel was destroyed in World War II. Only one pillar remained original. It was rebuilt after 1945 using the white sandstone from Kaisersteinbruch quarry.

In 1784, the former bishop's see was moved to St. Pölten. Only in 1963 did Wiener Neustadt became the see of the military bishop, and the chapel was promoted to cathedral status in 1987 under military bishop Alfred Kostelecky.

=== Academy Park ===
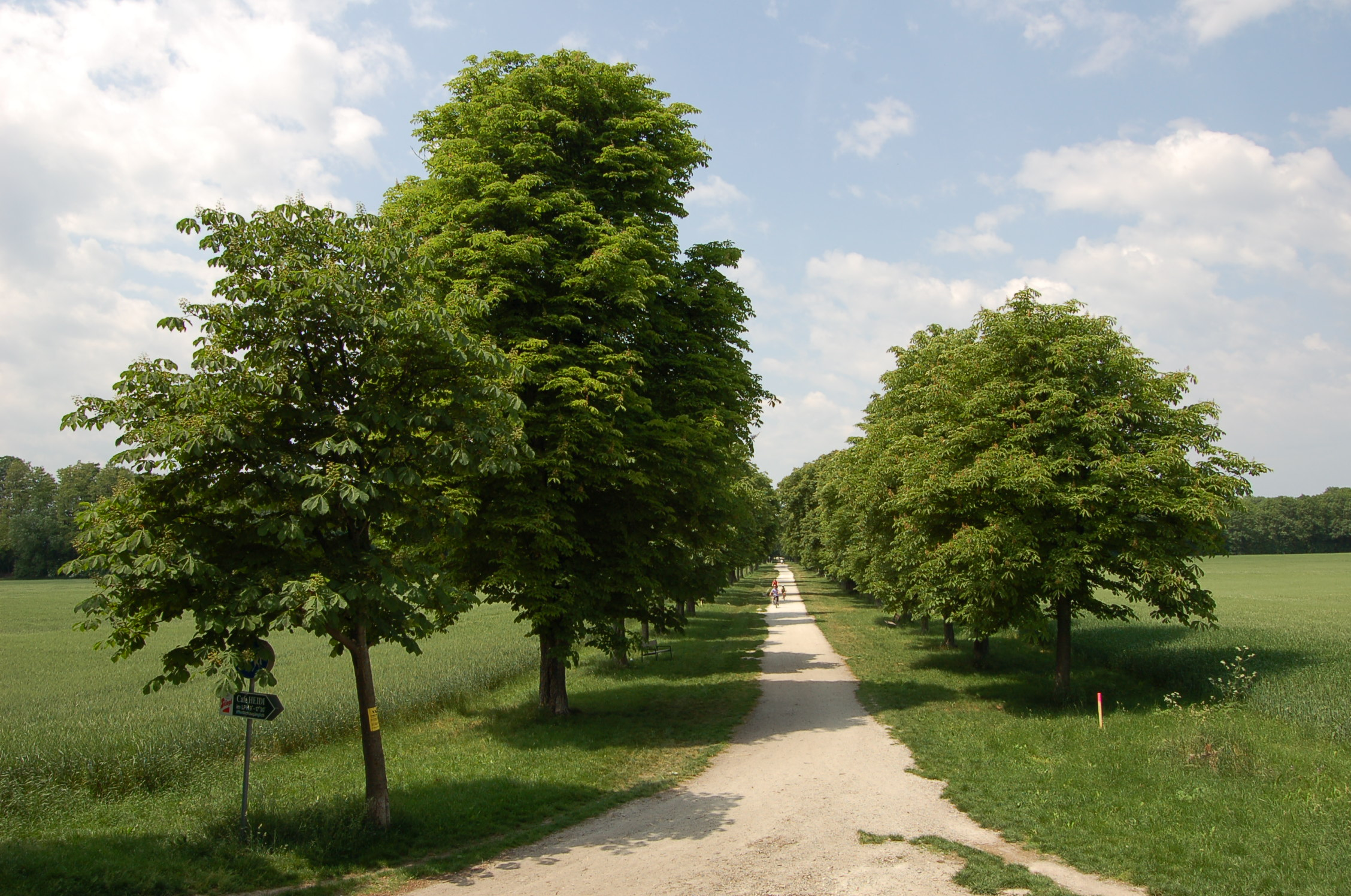
Academy Park

The originally swampy area between the town and Leitha river was drained under Frederick III. Also a zoological garden was created, which existed until 1751. The 106-hectare (262-acre) area was later converted into a park and has been open to the public since Maria Theresa.

== See also ==
- List of castles in Austria
