= List of Catholic churches in Austria =

This is a list of Catholic churches in Austria.

== Cathedrals ==
See: List of cathedrals in Austria#Roman Catholic

- Graz Cathedral
- Gurk Cathedral
- Innsbruck Cathedral
- New Cathedral, Linz
- Salzburg Cathedral
- St. Stephen's Cathedral, Vienna

== Basilicas ==
- Dominican Church, Vienna
- Mariatrost Basilica
- Mariazell Basilica
- Piarist Church, Vienna
- Schottenkirche, Vienna

== Chapels ==
- Dachstein Chapel
- Sisi Chapel
- Vergilius Chapel

== Other churches ==
- Am Schöpfwerk Church
- Augustinian Church, Vienna
- Capuchin Church, Vienna
- St. Leopold's Church, Donaufeld
- Church of Mariahilf
- Church of St. Nikolaus, Lockenhaus
- Church of the Teutonic Order, Vienna
- Döbling Parish Church
- Donau City Church
- Franciscan Church, Salzburg
- Franciscan Church, Vienna
- Glanzing Parish Church
- Heiligenstadt Parish Church St. Michael
- Heiligenstadt St. James's Church
- Jesuit Church, Vienna
- Kaasgrabenkirche
- Kahlenbergerdorf Parish Church
- Karlskirche
- Kirche am Steinhof
- Maltese Church, Vienna
- Maria am Gestade
- Minoritenkirche, Vienna
- Servite Church, Vienna
- St. Anne's Church, Vienna
- St. Michael's Church, Vienna
- St. Peter's Church, Vienna
- St. Rupert's Church, Vienna
- St. Ulrich, Vienna
- Votive Church, Vienna
- Wotruba Church
- Zirl Parish Church

== See also ==
- List of Roman Catholic dioceses in Austria
- Roman Catholicism in Austria
