= Zirl =

Market town in Tyrol, Austria

- Municipality
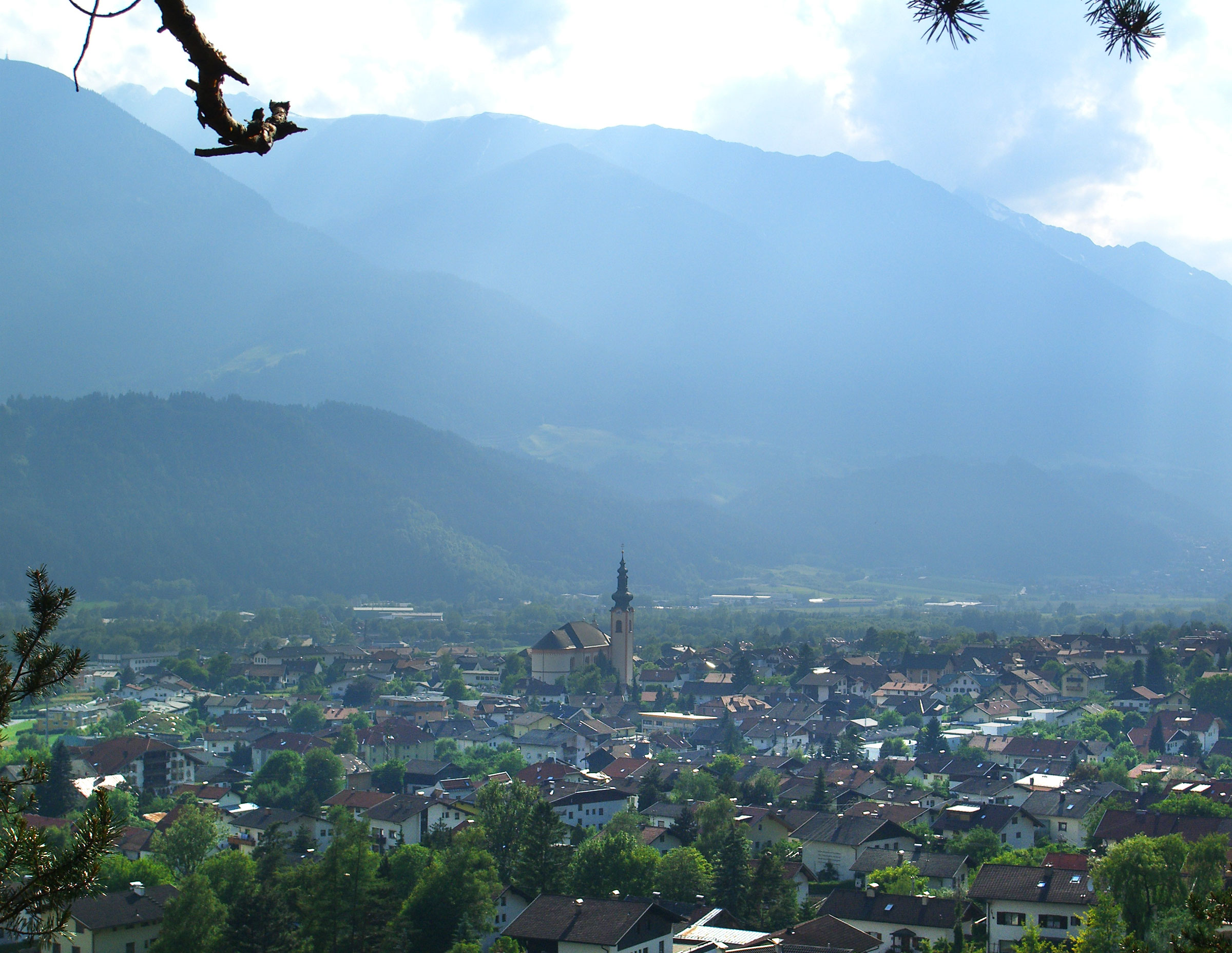

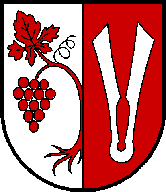
- Coat of arms

- Location within Austria
- Coordinates: 47°16′24″N 11°14′29″E
- Country: Austria
- State: Tyrol
- District: Innsbruck-Land

Government
  - Mayor: Hanspeter Schneider (SPÖ)

Area
  - Total: 57.24 km^{2} (22.10 sq mi)
- Elevation: 622 m (2,041 ft)

Population (2020)
  - Total: 8,110
  - Density: 142/km^{2} (367/sq mi)
- Time zone: UTC+1 (CET)
  - Summer (DST): UTC+2 (CEST)
- Postal code: 6170
- Area code: 05238
- Vehicle registration: IL
- Website: www.mg.zirl.at

Zirl is a municipality and market town in the district of Innsbruck-Land in the Austrian state of Tyrol. It is known for its parish church, UNESCO-recognised Zachäussingen celebration, and history of nativity scene–making. Situated at an altitude of 622 metres above sea level, it lies approximately 10 kilometres west of Innsbruck at the edge of the Karwendel mountains. The area around the town is frequented by climbers, hikers, and cyclers.

== Geography ==
Zirl is known for its natural surroundings, which include the Martinswand rock face, the Ehnbach gorge, and parts of the Nordkette mountain range. The Martinswand is a popular destination for climbers. The area is also part of a nature reserve and was once a favourite hunting ground of the Holy Roman Emperor Maximilian I, who famously took refuge in a cave now known as Emperor Max Grotto.

The town is a starting point for hikes along the Karwendel High Route, as well as trails leading to the Neue Magdeburger Mountain Hut and the Solstein Refuge. Cyclists also frequent the Inn Cycle Route – Tiroler Oberland, which connects the Swiss Alpine valley of Engadin with Innsbruck.

== History and culture ==
The area where present-day Zirl is located was first mentioned as "Cyreolu" and "Cyreola" in documents written in 799.

Zirl, along with the nearby town of Thaur, became a center for Tyrolean nativity scene–making in the 17th century. This cultural heritage is preserved and showcased at the Local History and Nativity Scene Museum (Heimat- und Krippenmuseum), which displays a wide collection of cribs used during Christmas and Lent. The museum also features historic tools, farming equipment, photographs, and original works by Franz Plattner, a notable church painter from Zirl.

The Parish Church of the Holy Cross is another important landmark of Zirl. First mentioned in 1391, it features a 62-metre-high tower constructed during the reign of Maximilian I and capped with a Baroque onion dome in 1770. The current church building was constructed between 1847 and 1849, and is adorned with frescoes in the Nazarene style by Plattner, painted between 1860 and 1887. The church also houses a baptismal font dating back to the time of Maximilian I. In 2017, the church’s roof and façade were restored to their original colours.

One of the most significant annual traditions in Zirl is the Zachäussingen, a local custom that has been recognised by UNESCO as intangible cultural heritage. On the third Sunday of every October, townspeople gather at 4:30 a.m. to sing the "Zachäuslied" outside the Parish Church of the Holy Cross, followed by music, dancing, and local delicacies. The celebration has been around for over 300 years.

The grapevine on Zirl's coat of arms is a reference to the town's longstanding tradition of viticulture, supported by the area's relatively mild climate.
