= Heiligenstadt Parish Church St. Michael =

Parish church in Döbling, Vienna, Austria

Coordinates: 48°15′12″N 16°21′16″E

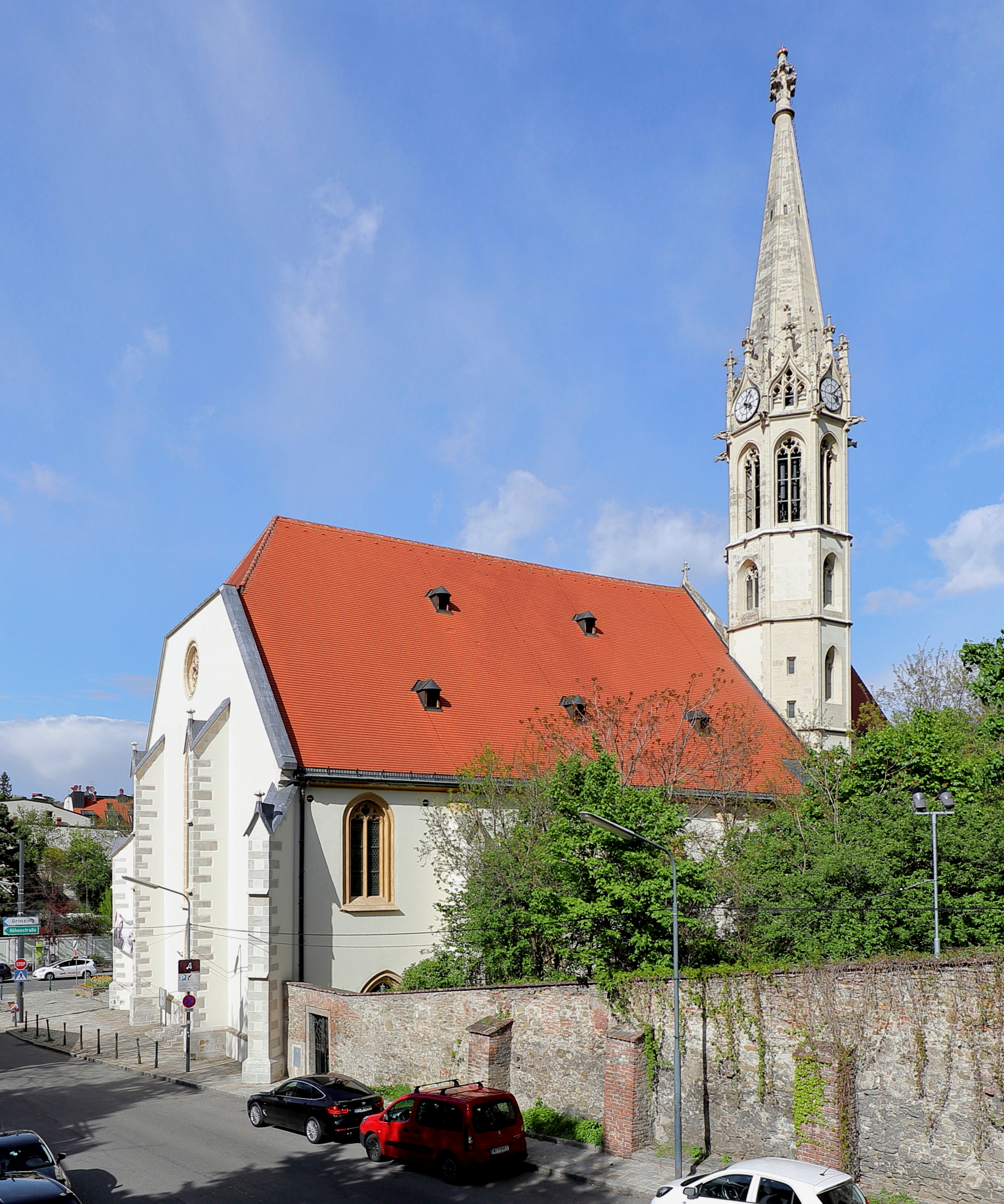
Parish Church St. Michael's in Heiligenstadt

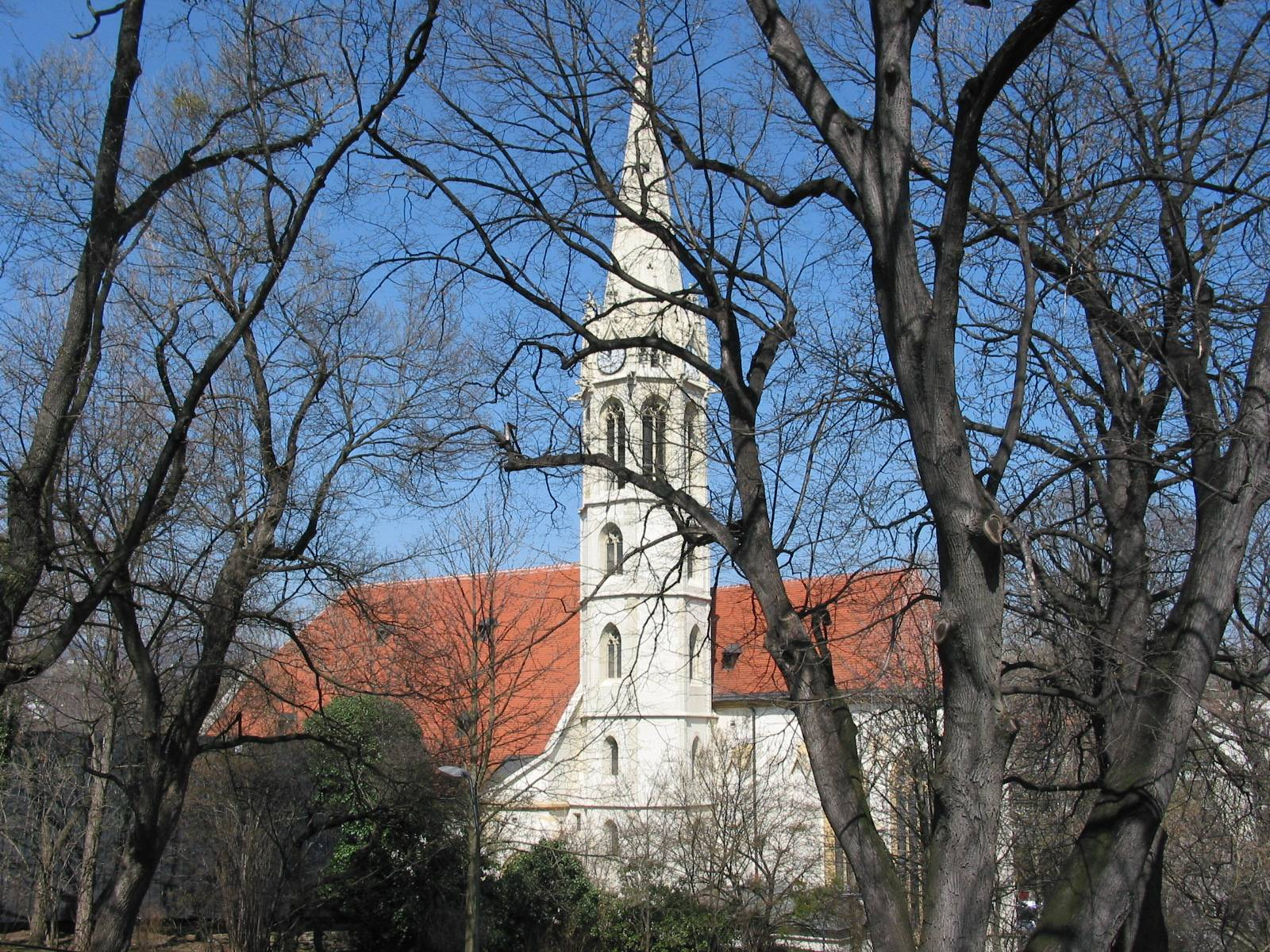
Southside of Parish Church St. Michael

The Parish Church St. Michael's (German: Pfarrkirche St. Michael) is a Roman Catholic parish church in the suburb of Heiligenstadt in the 19th district of Vienna, Döbling. It is dedicated to the Archangel Michael.

== History ==
For centuries, the Heiligenstadt parish was an important parish in the area that now forms the district of Döbling. The church is mentioned for the first time in 1243 as a subsidiary of the Klosterneuburg Monastery; it was elevated to the status of a parish church in the 14th century. The parish covered not just Heiligenstadt, but also the surrounding villages of Nußdorf, Grinzing, Sievering, Salmannsdorf, Neustift am Walde, Oberdöbling and Unterdöbling. The parish priests were provided by the Klosterneuburg Monastery; even today, many of the district’s parishes are supervised by individuals belonging to the Monastery. As the Heiligenstadt parish was responsible for such a large number of believers, a relatively large church was built in the village. Over time however, the surrounding settlements all became independent parishes, which resulted in a gradual loss of importance for Heiligenstadt. The creation of the Sievering parish in 1348 robbed the Heiligenstadt parish of large sections of its former territory, as both Salmannsdorf and Neustift am Walde were included in the new parish. Döbling, which later became part of the Währing parish, was also made independent. The neighbouring villages of Nußdorf and Grinzing remained a part of the Heiligenstadt parish until Joseph II’s parish reform.

It was necessary to repair the Gothic building following the Ottoman invasions; in 1723, it was rebuilt in Baroque style. By the end of the 19th century however, the building was in such a state of disrepair that everything but the choir and the lower walls had to be torn down. The new construction, which resembled the old church in all aspects except the spire, was designed by Richard Jordan, who was also responsible for the nearby Döbling Carmelite Nunnery. Josef and Martin Schömer were also involved in the construction of the new parish church.

== Structure ==
The Heiligenstadt Parish Church is a Gothic revival church with multiple naves. The altar, which is also the work of the architects responsible for the reconstruction of the church, shows in the centre the Archangel Michael, after whom the parish is named. The secondary altar, which was also produced by the same architects, is a Gothic revival work showing Mary. Only this secondary altar, which is dedicated to Saint Sebastian survived the Baroque reconstruction of the church. The original altar, the work of Matthias Steindl, was taken to the Leopoldau Parish Church; the altar painting by Johann Georg Schmidt went to the museum at the Klosterneuburg Monastery. The Stations of the Cross are a newer addition; they were created in 1930/31 by Franz Zelezny. The key figures in the depiction of the Passion of Christ bear the faces of prominent personalities (such as Chancellor Ignaz Seipel) and inhabitants of Heiligenstadt.
