= Maltese Church, Vienna =

Church in Vienna, Austria

Coordinates: 48°12′18″N 16°22′16″E

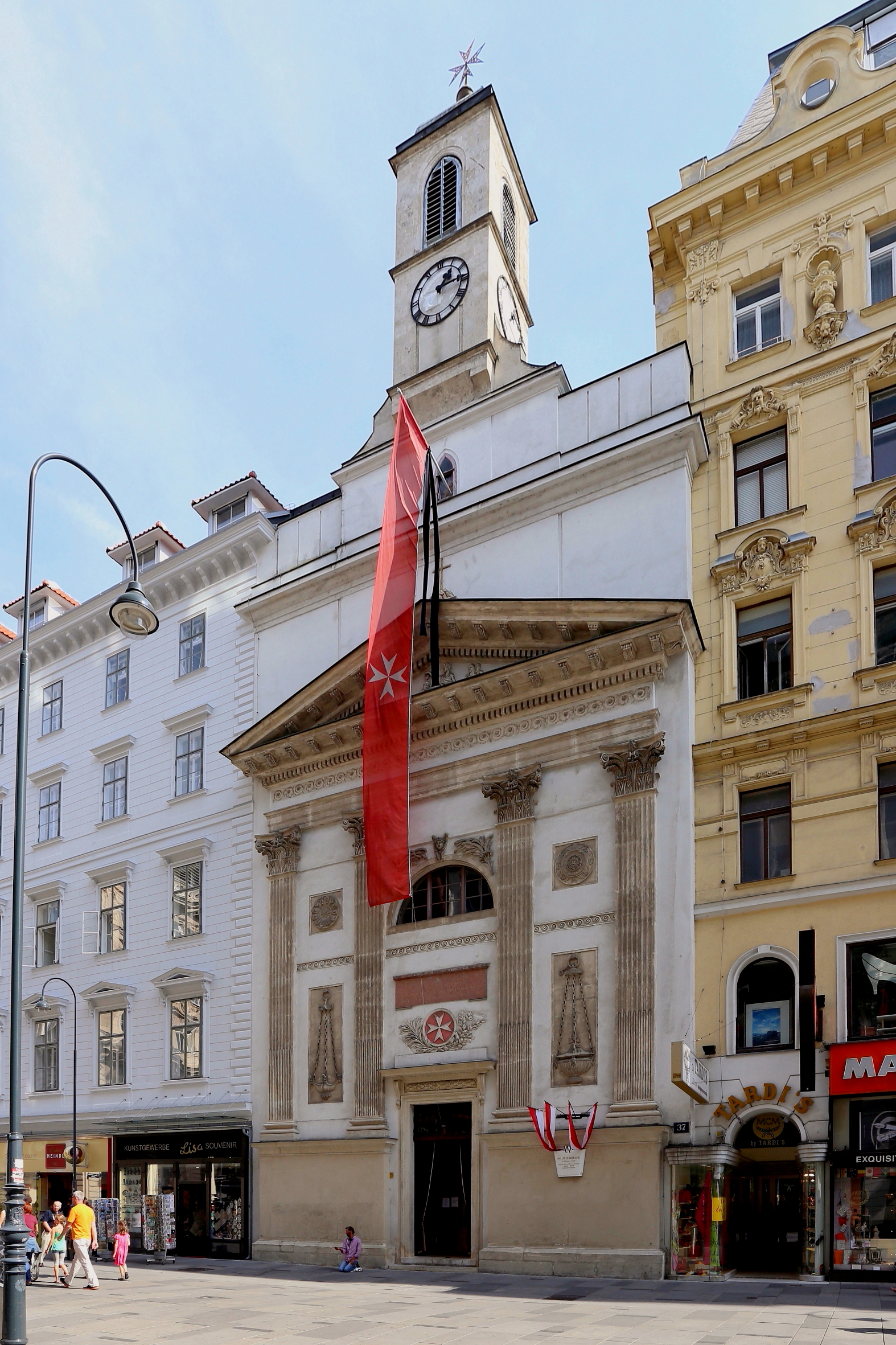
Maltese Church in Vienna, Austria

The Maltese Church (German: Malteserkirche) (full name - Church of Saint John the Baptist) is a Roman Catholic Gothic church of the Knights Hospitaller in Vienna, on Kärntner Straße in the 1. Wiener Gemeindebezirk Innere Stadt.

The first church on this site is mentioned in 1217, as a "House of the Prueder of the Order of Saint John", a commandry to care and support crusaders. The current building was built in the mid 15th century. In the 17th century it was a favoured preaching location for Abraham a Sancta Clara. This building was rebuilt to fit contemporary taste in the Baroque era and in 1806, and the Kommendenhaus (1839) and parts of the church (1857) had stained glass added during the 19th century. The Order ran into financial trouble after the First World War and in 1933 had to sell the church and the Johanneshof, and the church was given over to other uses within a historical preservation order. It was bought back in 1960 and restored in stages in 1968, 1972 and 1983–84, finishing with a general restoration in 1998.

The church's high altarpiece was painted in 1730 by Johann Georg Schmidt. The balcony type Empire marble pulpit was built during the 1806-08 reconstruction; it is decorated with a Maltese cross, a dove and gilt rosettes.

== Gallery ==
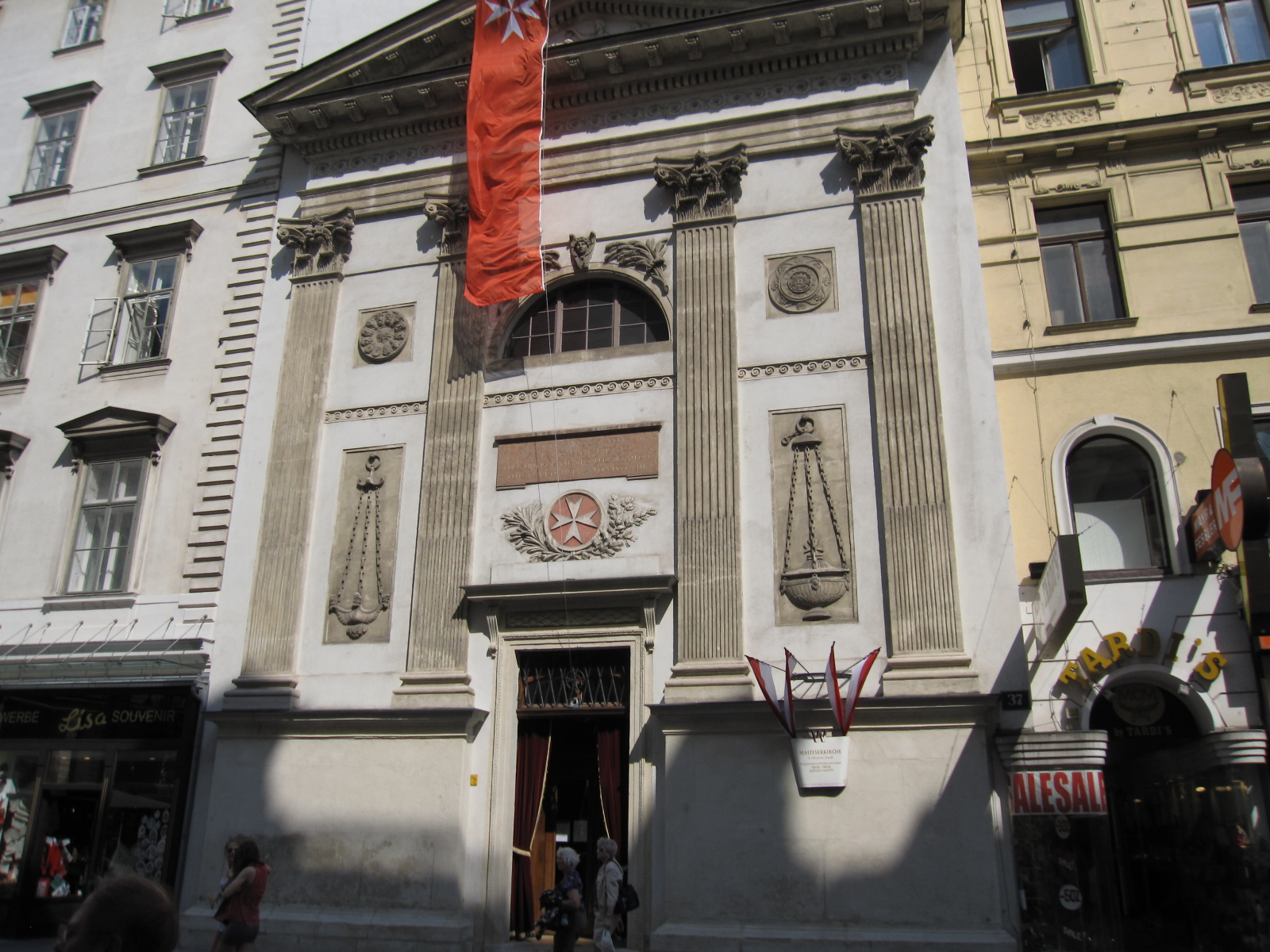
Church façade

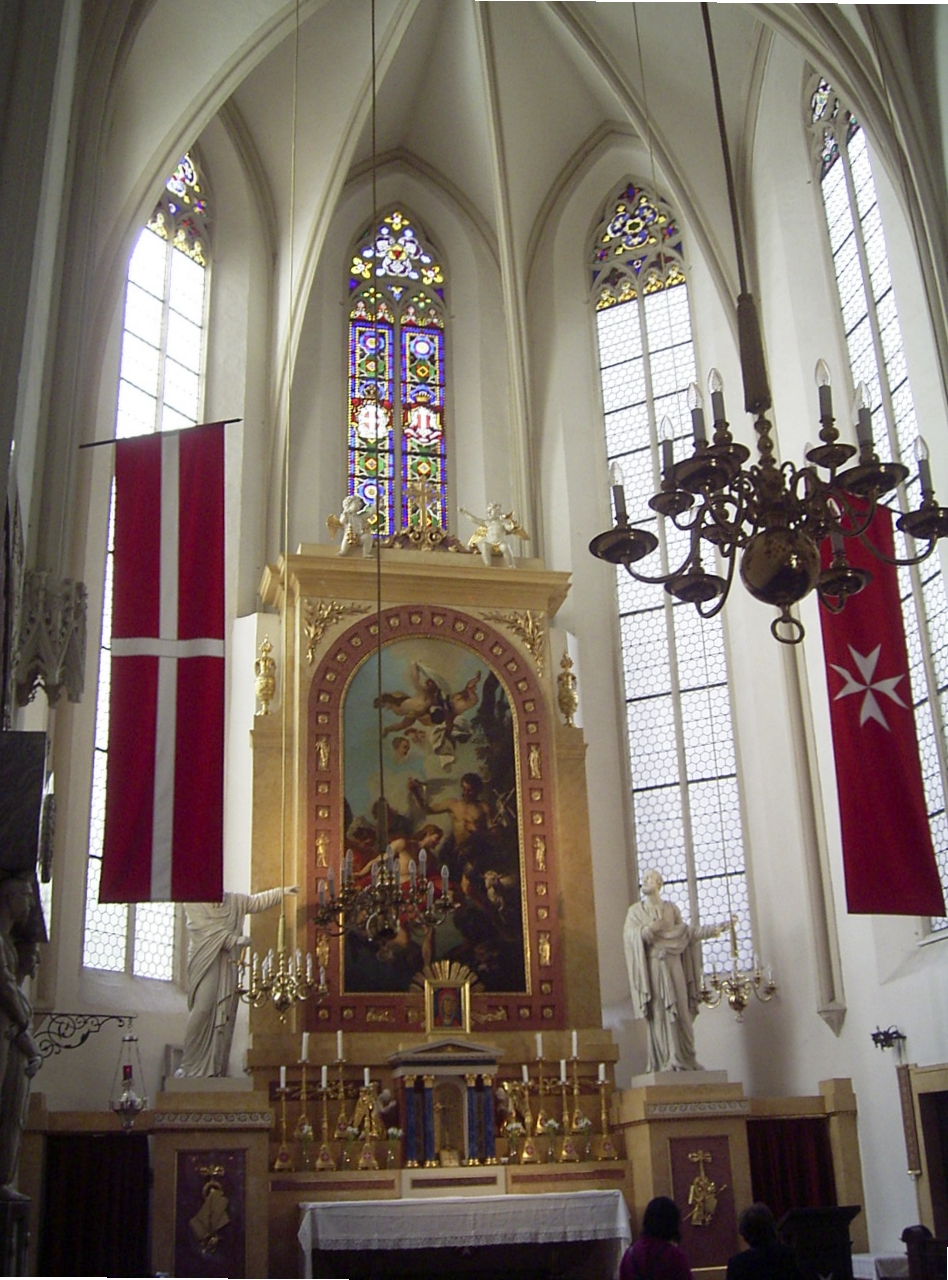
High altar of the Malteserkirche

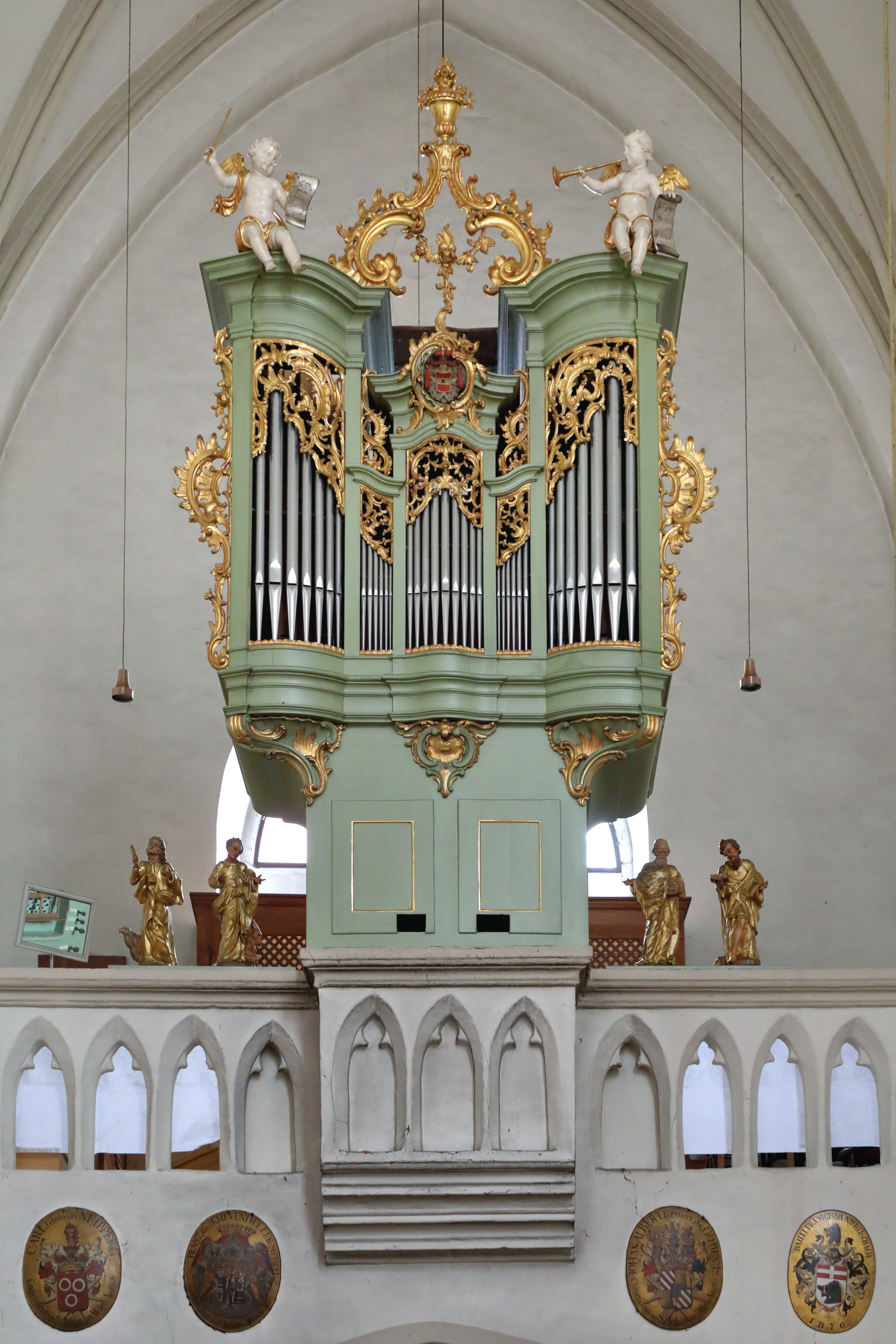
Organ of the Maltese Church

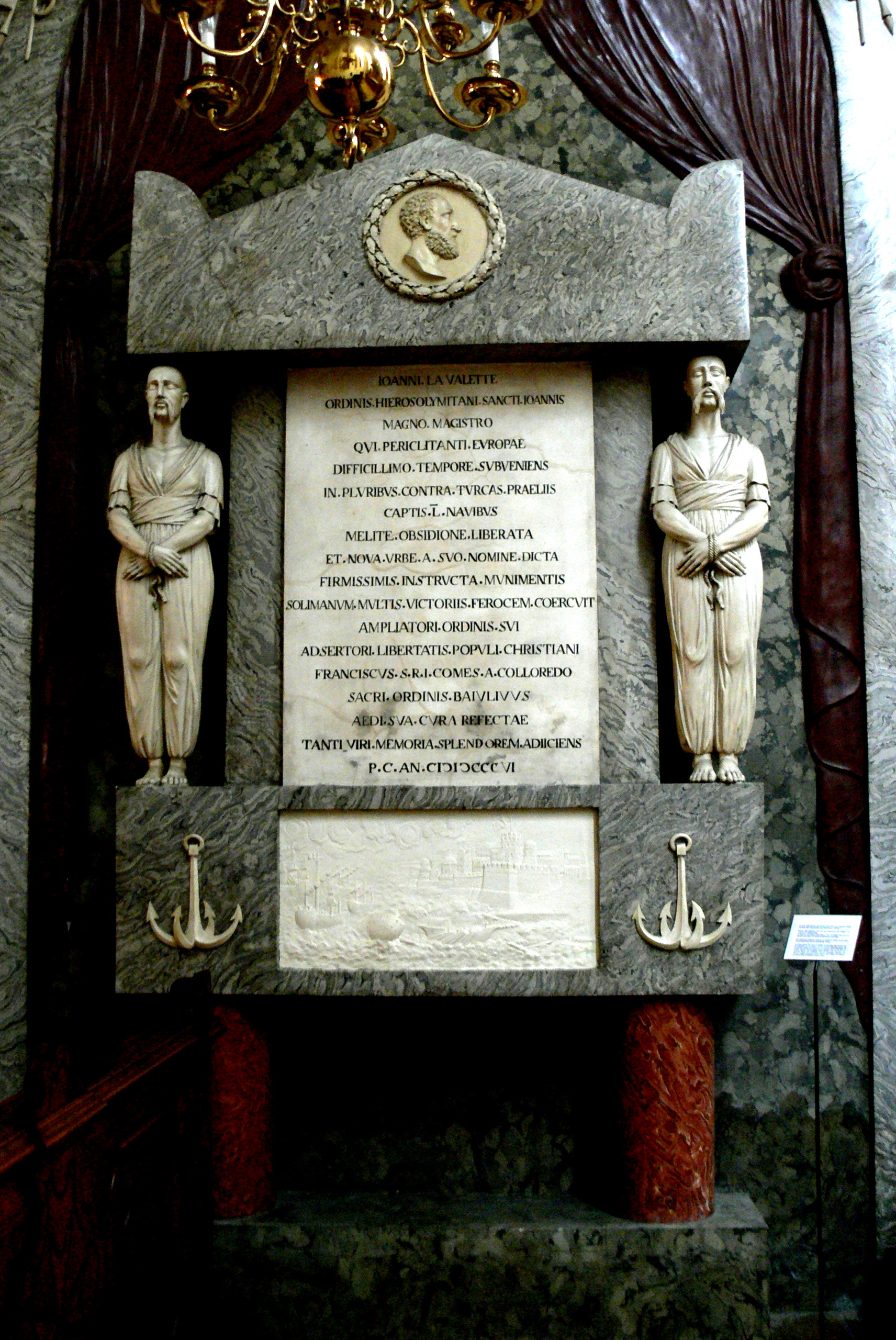
Monument for grand master Jean Parisot de la Valette, 1806

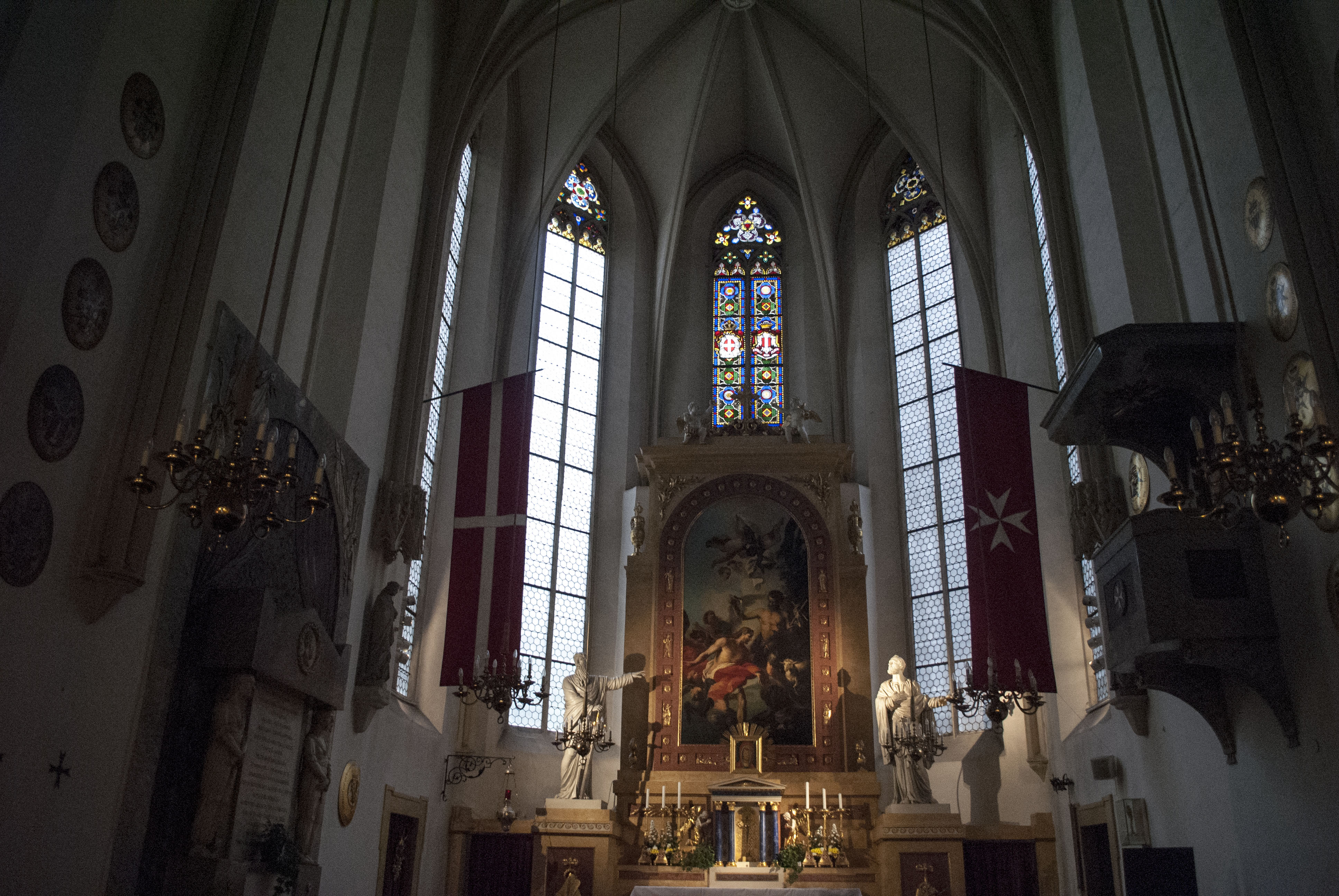
Church interior

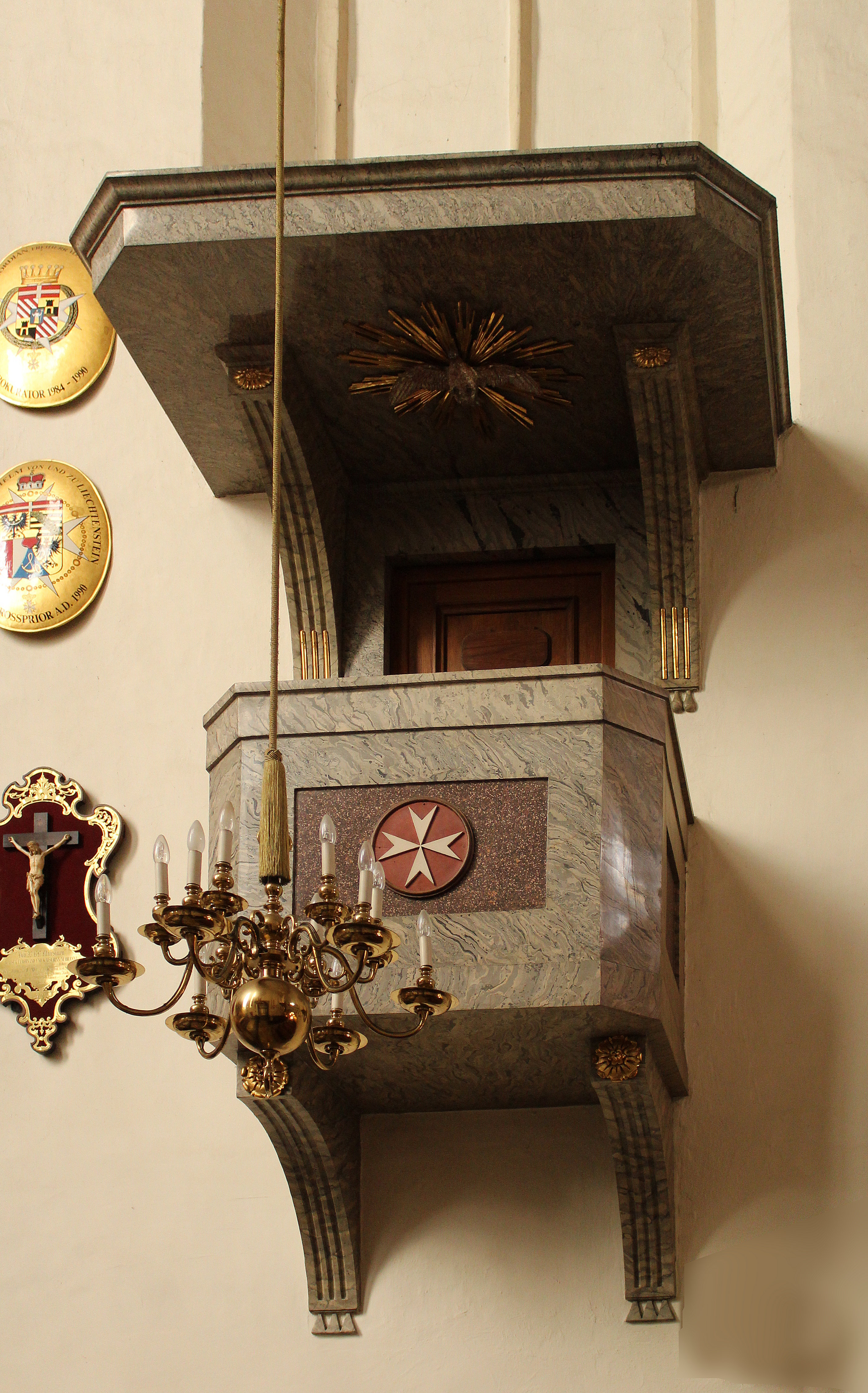
Empire pulpit
