= Ehenbach =

River in Germany

- Wooden bridge over the Ehenbach, between Holzhammer (a part of Schnaittenbach) and Unterköblitz (a part of Wernberg-Köblitz)

Location
- Country: Germany
- State: Bavaria

Physical characteristics
- Mouth
  - location: Naab
  - coordinates: 49.5494°N 12.1342°E
- Length: 18.5 km (11.5 mi)

Basin features
- Progression: Naab→ Danube→ Black Sea

The Ehenbach is a river in Bavaria, Germany. It flows into the Naab near Wernberg-Köblitz.

== See also ==
- List of rivers of Bavaria
