= Glanzing Parish Church =

Parish church in Vienna

Coordinates: 48°14′37″N 16°19′16″E

Glanzing Parish Church (German: Glanzinger Pfarrkirche) is a Roman Catholic parish church in the suburb of Glanzing in the 19th district of Vienna, Döbling.

== History ==
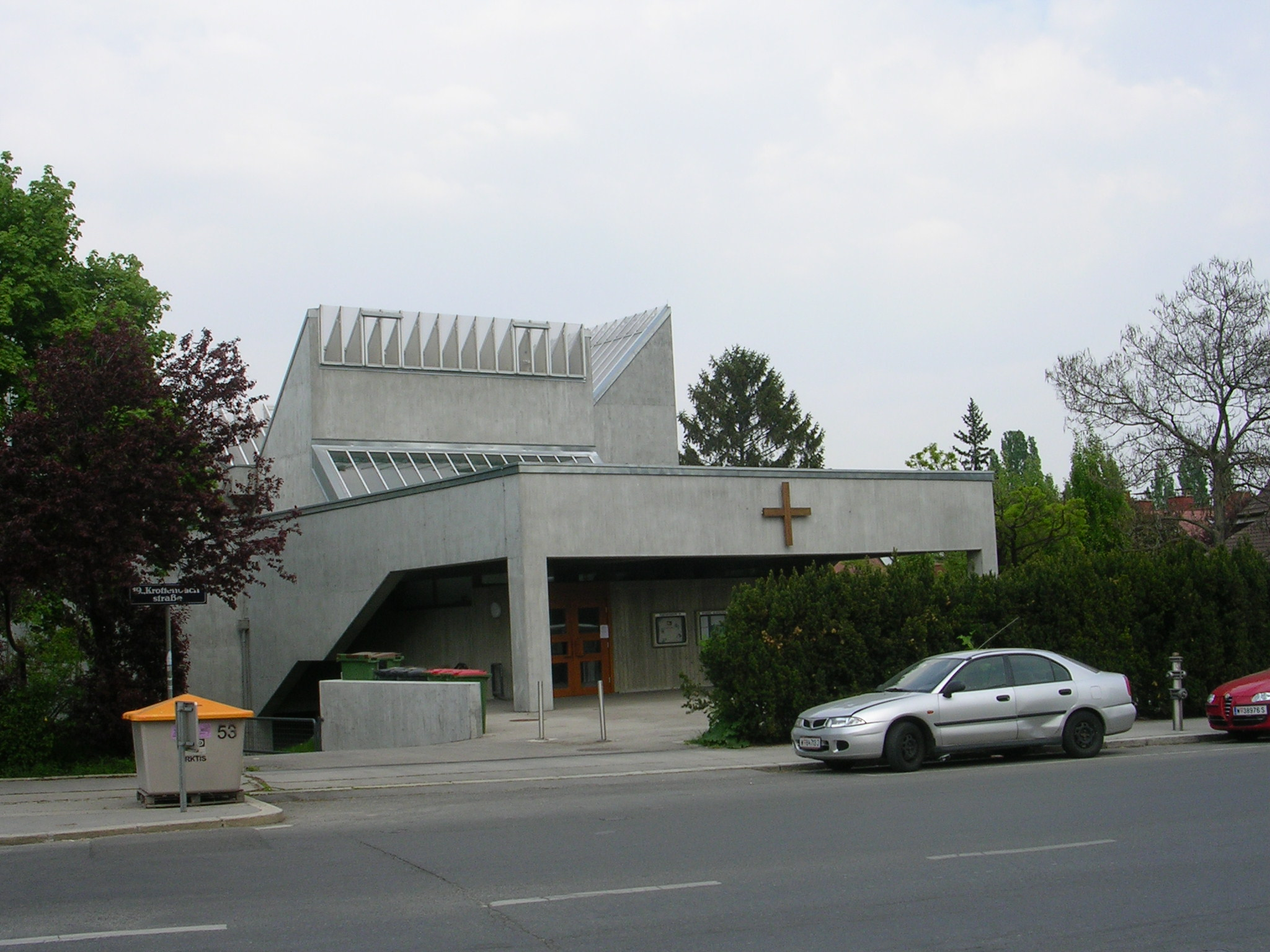
A view of the church from the Krottenbachstraße

The area of the parish of Glanzing originally belonged to the parish of Pötzleinsdorf. The route to the parish church was however difficult, particularly in winter, and over time the church proved too small as well. As a result, the local population was invited to attend church services held from 1930 or 1934 in the chapel of the Kinderklinik der Stadt Wien Glanzing (Glanzing Paediatric Clinic). The realisation of plans drawn up in the late 1930s to build a new church was frustrated by the outbreak of World War II.

In the first weeks after the end of the war, in May 1945, a garage in the Koschatgasse served as a provisional venue for services; the City of Vienna earmarked a section of the gardens in the Glanzinggasse in July of the same year for the construction of a church. At first, a wooden structure with space for 110 people was erected on this site. This structure was sanctified on 29 September 1946 and given the title Mariä Verkündigung (Annunciation of Mary), but several years passed before a proper church could be erected.

In 1957, a section of the garden belonging to the University of Natural Resources and Applied Life Sciences Vienna in the Krottenbachstraße, Obersievering, was purchased, where the parish church Verkündigung des Herren (Annunciation of the Lord), designed by the architect Josef Lackner, was built between 1969 and 1970. The wooden structure in the Glanzinggasse was taken down in 1972 but continued to serve as a provisional church in the settlement Am Biberhaufen in Donaustadt.

The new church was listed as a protected monument by the Bundesdenkmalamt in 2008.

== Further sources ==
- Wolfgang J. Bandion: Steinerne Zeugen des Glaubens. Die Heiligen Stätten der Stadt Wien. Wien: Herold 1989, pp. 399 f.
- Christine Klusacek, Kurt Stimmer: Döbling. Vom Gürtel zu den Weinbergen. Wien 1988
- Alfred Missong: Heiliges Wien. Ein Führer durch Wiens Kirchen und Kapellen. Wien: Wiener Dom-Verlag 1948, p. 311
- Godehard Schwarz: Döbling. Zehn historische Spaziergänge durch Wiens 19. Bezirk. Wien 2004
