= Heiligenstadt St. James's Church =

Coordinates: 48°15′17″N 16°21′33″E

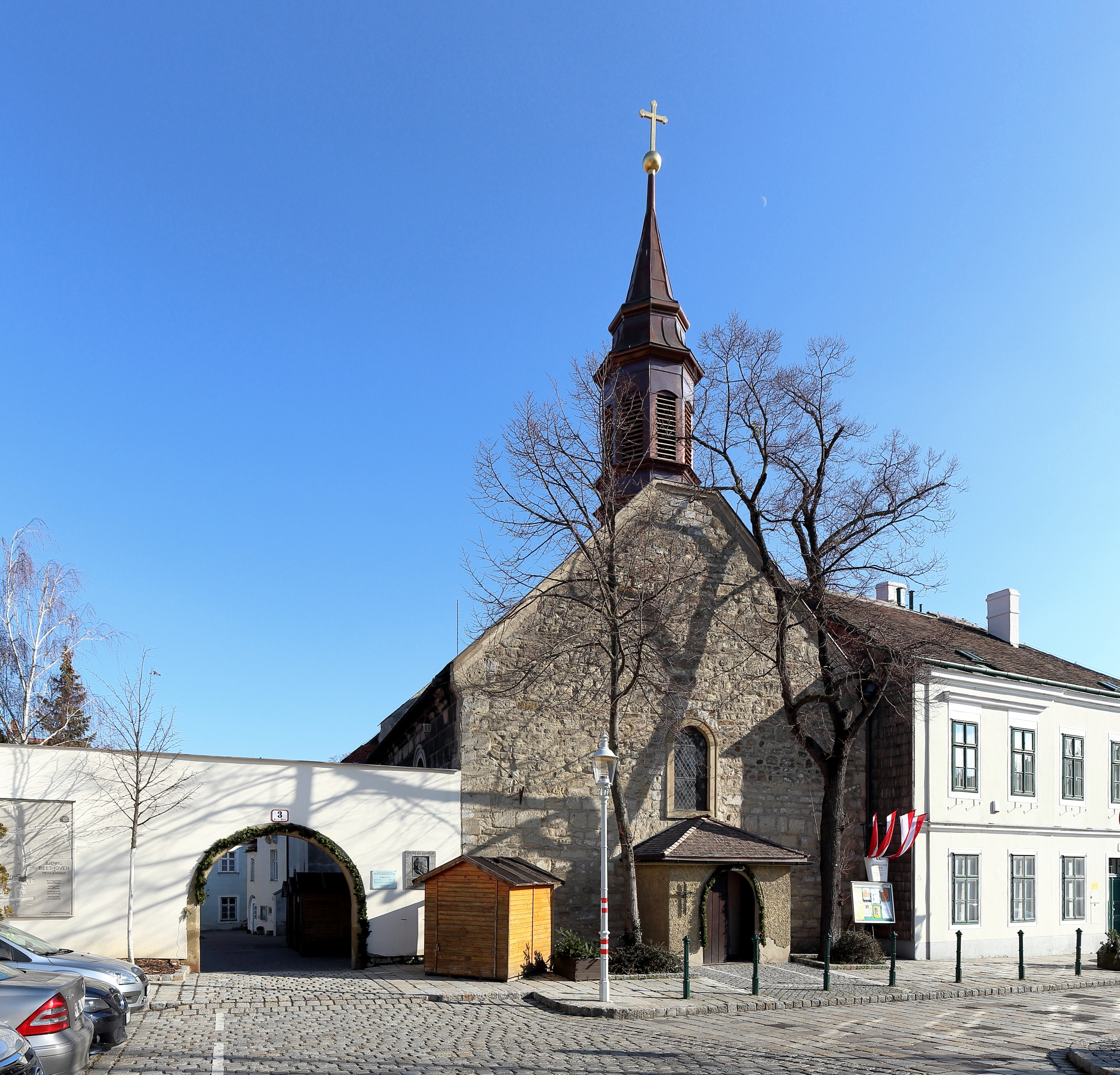
St. James's Church in Heiligenstadt

St. James's Church (German: Kirche St. Jakob) is one of two Roman Catholic churches in the parish of Heiligenstadt in the 19th district of Vienna, Döbling. It stands at the Pfarrplatz and is dedicated to James, son of Zebedee (Saint James).

The church is sometimes wrongly called St. Jacob's. The confusion arises because German, like many other languages, uses the same word for both James and Jacob.

== Description ==
The church takes the form of a simple Romanesque structure. Its modern-day appearance dates back to the 12th century. The church consists of a single nave with a raised and slightly offset choir. The left-hand side of the church has three round arched windows; the right-hand side only two.

== History ==
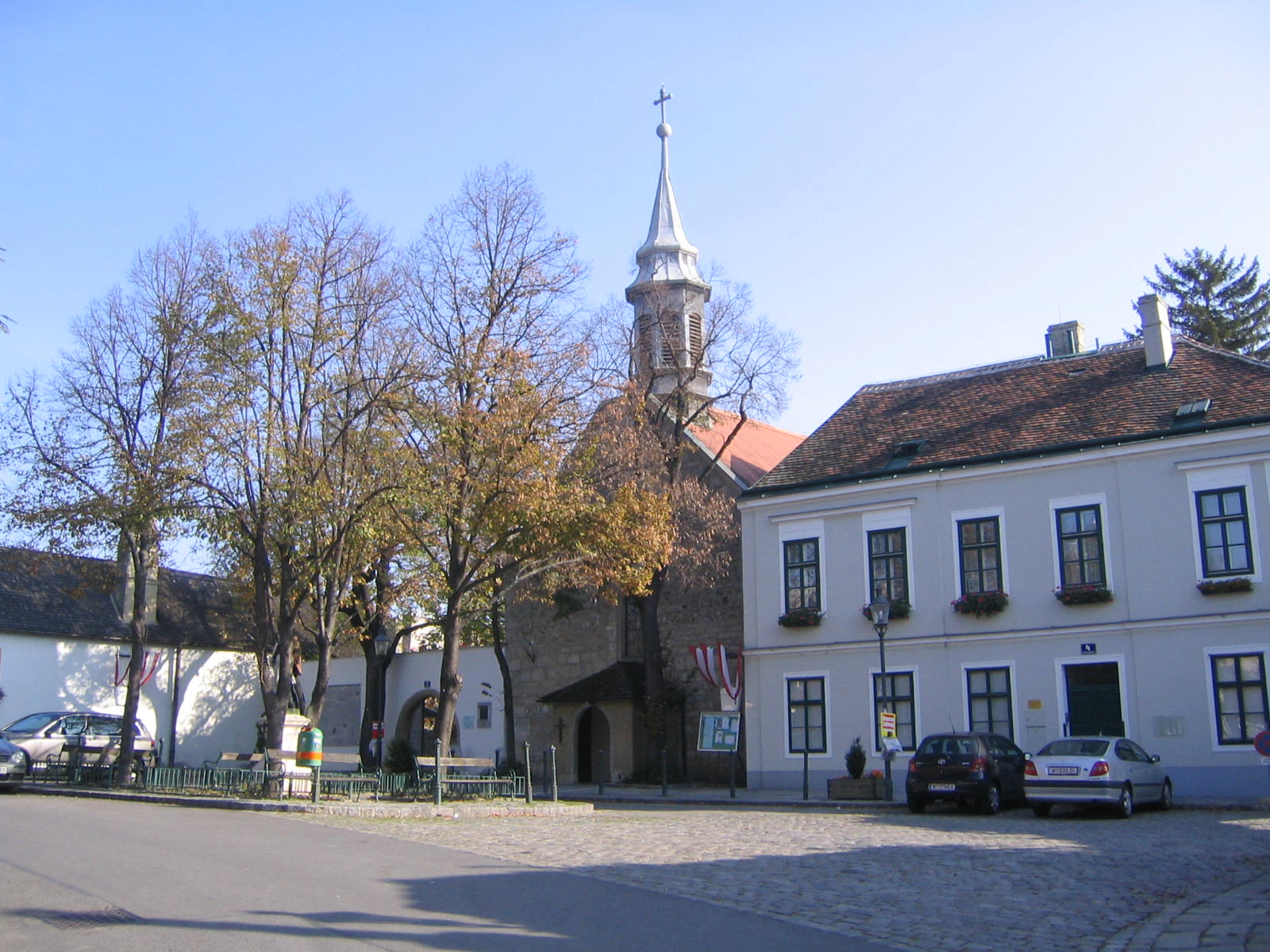
The Pfarrplatz. St. James's Church stands in the middle, the former Heiligenstadt primary school is on the right

Heiligenstadt was early on home to an organised Christian community with regular religious services. St. James's Church's roots can be traced back to the 5th century.

From 1105, there are reports of the presence of a cult to Saint Severinus of Noricum in Heiligenstadt. A document from Bishop Rüdiger von Passau dating from 1243 indicates that the church was a subsidiary of St. Martin in Klosterneuburg. It was made independent in 1246.

A hospital and rectory next to St. James's Church are first mentioned in 1263. In 1307, Heiligenstadt was attached to the Klosterneuburg Monastery, and the parish priests of Heiligenstadt have been Canons Regular ever since. At the time, the parish of Heiligenstadt also covered the neighbouring communities of Grinzing, Sievering, Salmannsdorf, Nussdorf, Oberdöbling and Unterdöbling. The parish chronicle records that the parish was served by one parish priest, two parochial vicars and five mounted chaplains in 1480.

The church was destroyed on 14 October 1529, during the first siege of Vienna. It was rebuilt in 1534 and renovated in 1668. Both the church and the hospital were destroyed in the second siege of Vienna in 1683, whereafter only the church was rebuilt. In 1745, Cardinal Sigismund von Kollonitz donated an artefact belonging to Saint Severinus to the church, which has been revered as a holy relic ever since. The church spire was built in 1752.

During an archaeological dig in 1952–53, the remains of a Roman building were uncovered beneath St. James's Church. The Roman ruins lay within the bounds of the church and sometimes beyond; the building had been destroyed twice and houses two early Christian graves. The tiles used on the graves were produced by the Tenth Legion.

To the north of the church lies a Roman cemetery; an Avar grave was also found near here in 1980. It has been suggested that this cemetery may be the origin of the name Heiligenstadt (Holy town). Every cemetery was once considered a “locus sanctus” (Holy place); this cemetery may have been so significant for Heiligenstadt as it developed during the Middle Ages that the settlement was named after it. Earlier theories that the modern name is a reference to the grave of Saint Severinus have been rejected by more recent research.

Next to the church is a vintner's house in which Ludwig van Beethoven stayed during summer 1817.
