= Zirl Parish Church =

Church in Zirl, Austria

Coordinates: 47°16′17″N 11°14′34″E

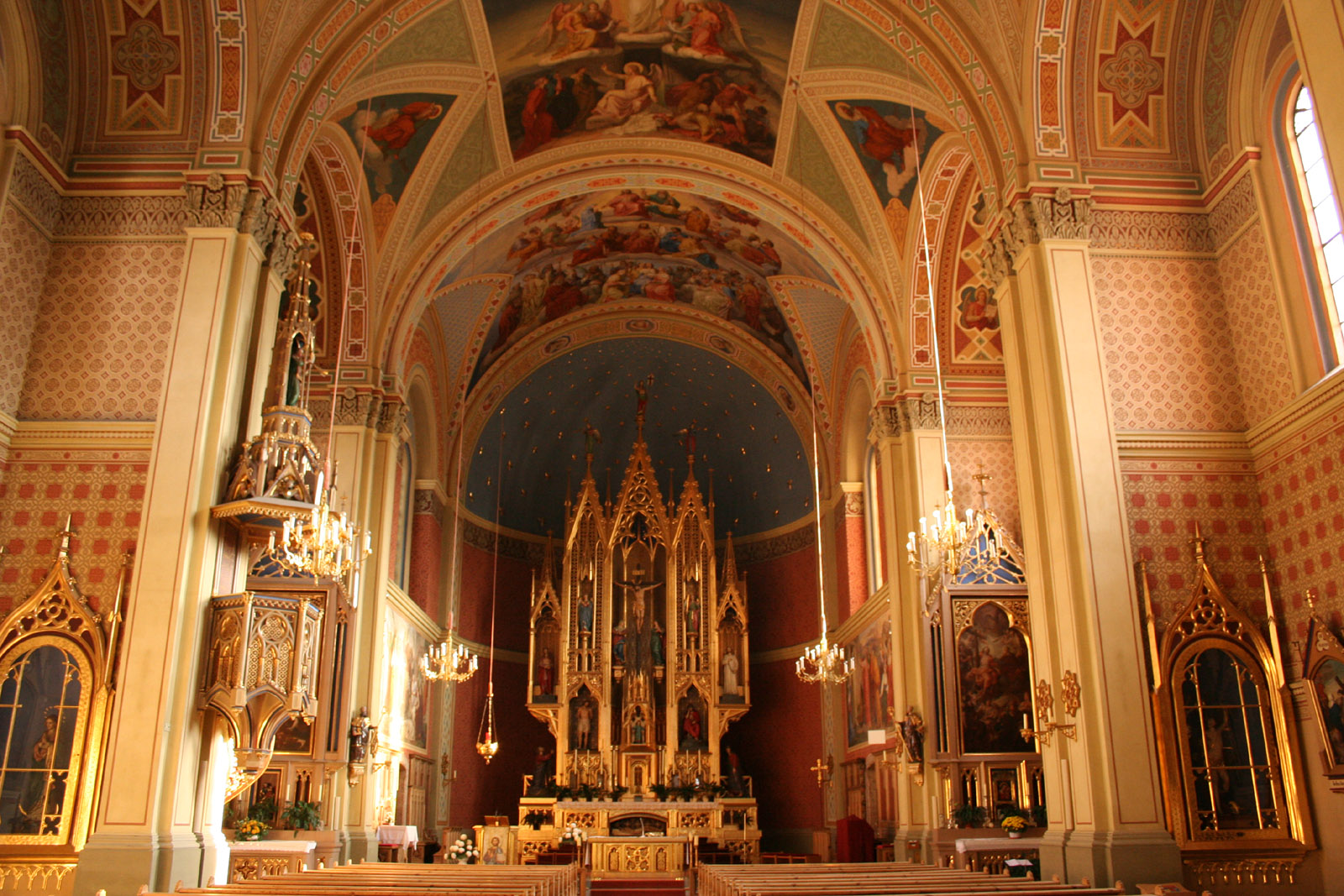
Zirl Parish Church nave and high altar

The Zirl Parish Church (German: Pfarrkirche Zirl), also known as the Holy Cross Parish Church, is the largest place of worship in Zirl, a community in Tyrol, Austria.

Built in the 19th century under the auspices of Cons. Peter Alois Bauer and Fruehmesser Alois Moriggl, the painter Franz Plattner decorated the entire interior with frescoes in vivid colours. This work occupied the master for a significant period of time. The frescos in the vault were created between 1862 and 1874. Remarkable as well are the abstract floral patterns that cover all the interior walls outside the frescos as well as the gilded pulpit.

== Architectural Style ==
As the architect predominantly used the round arch, this building is clearly neo-romanesque. Using 19th-century building materials and techniques it was possible to create much larger windows, compared to monuments from the original Romanesque period. Hence, sunlight floods the interior and amplifies the frescoes' vivid colours.

Gothic elements can be found in the pointed arches of altar and pulpit, nevertheless, they form a harmonious whole with the entire building.

== frescos ==
The vaulted ceiling is graced by images of the Nativity and the Resurrection of Christ. Immediately above the altar, the Holy Trinity is depicted, surrounded by the Virgin Mary, the prophets of the Old Testament, the four evangelists, and the community of the faithful.

The choir to the left and right of the altar contains two frescoes: Christ is shown entering Jerusalem on Palm Sunday, and the Lazarus is shown resurrected. The artist managed to arrange a noteworthy interaction of natural light and his painting in the left side of the choir, depicting Jesus' entrance into Jerusalem on Palm Sunday. Around noon, rays of sunlight reach the Messiah and the disciples immediately surrounding him. In contrast, those waiting for him with their perfectly understandable, yet earthly wishes and needs—with sometimes desperate hope—are for the time being shrouded in shadow. Thus, power and certainty of the coming salvation are being contrasted with human weakness, doubt and despair.

Frescos in the Zirl Parish Church

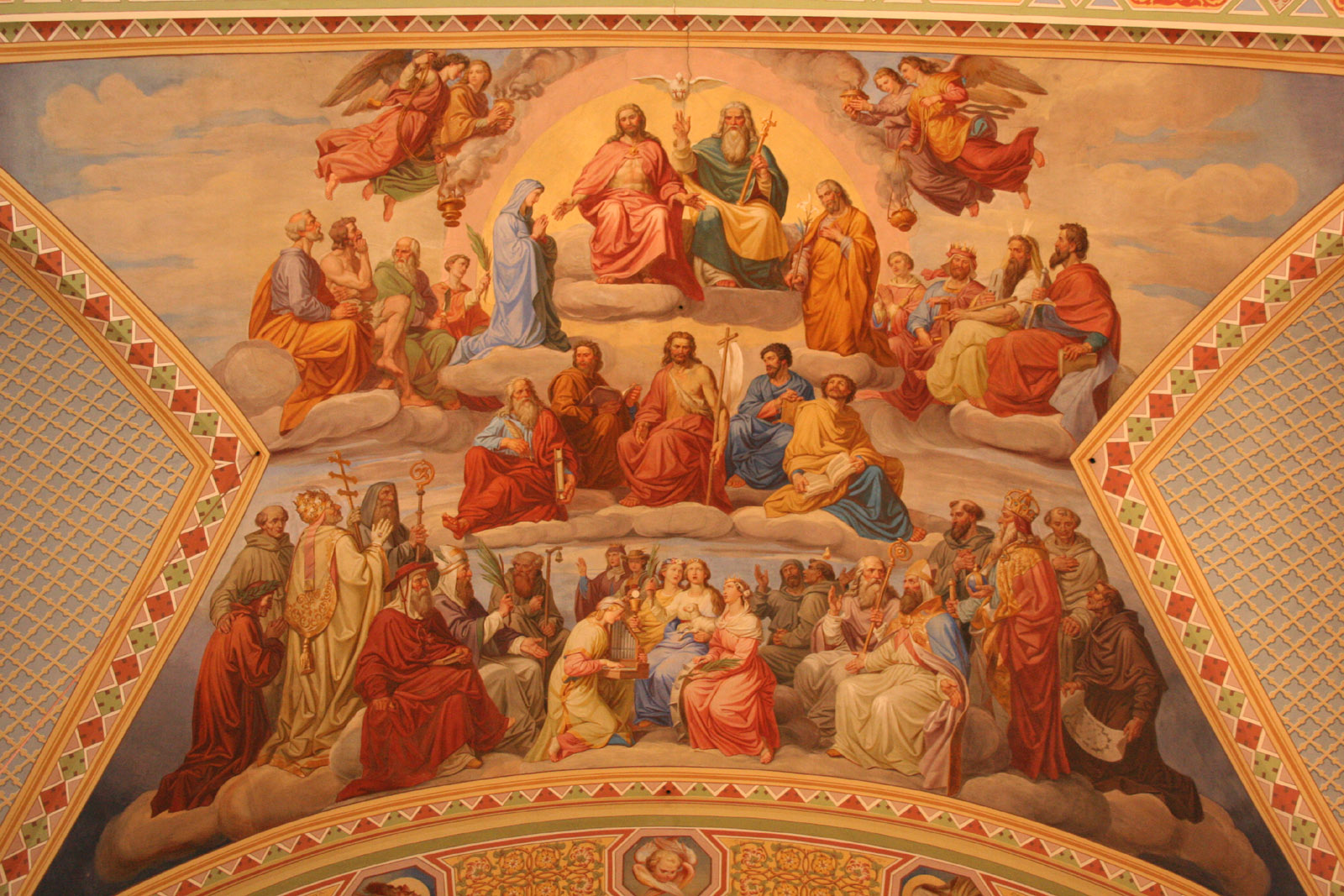
Above the Altar: Holy Trinity, Prophets, Evangelists and the Faithful

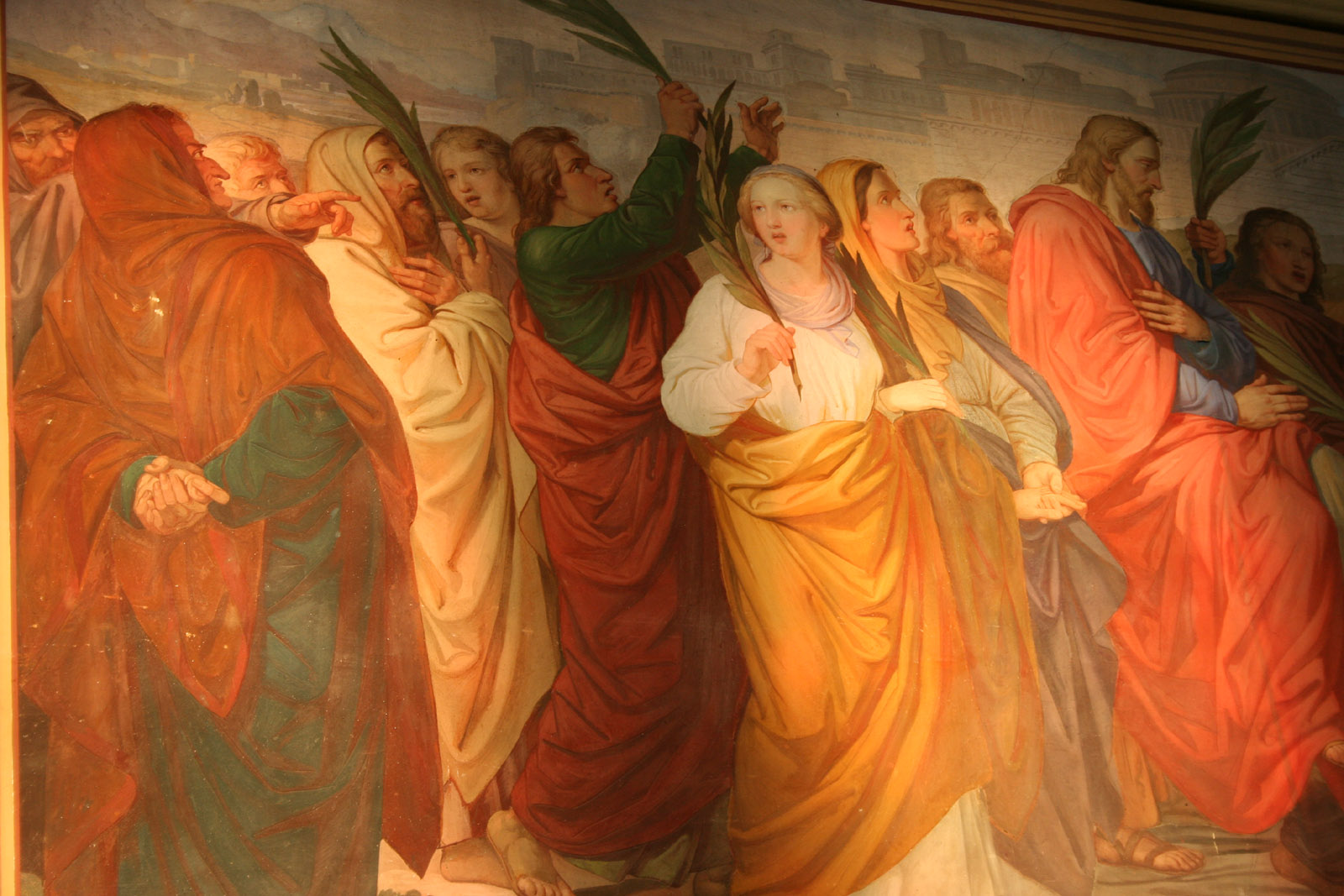
Left Choir: Jesus entering Jerusalem

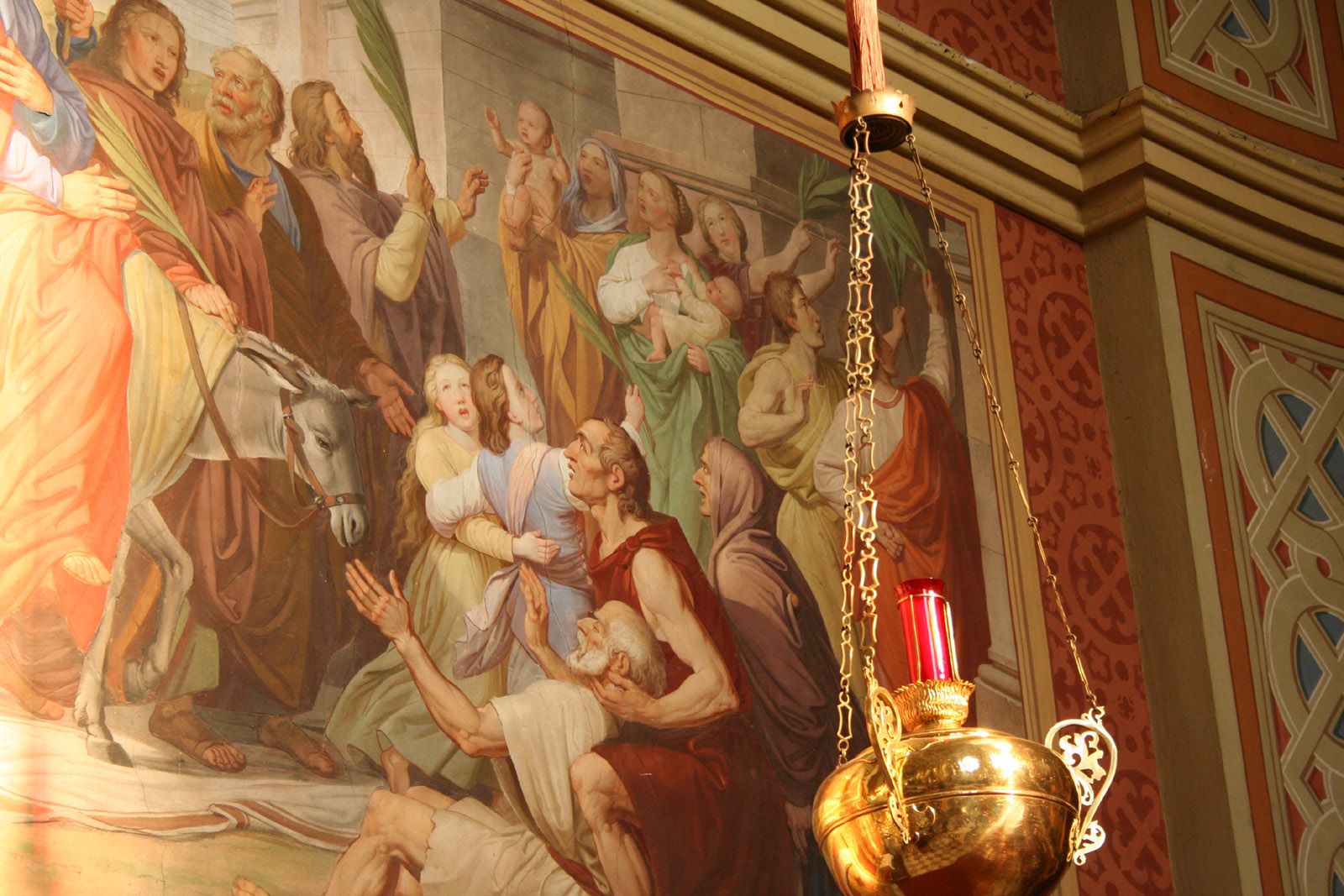
Left Choir: Jesus entering Jerusalem, People waiting in anticipation

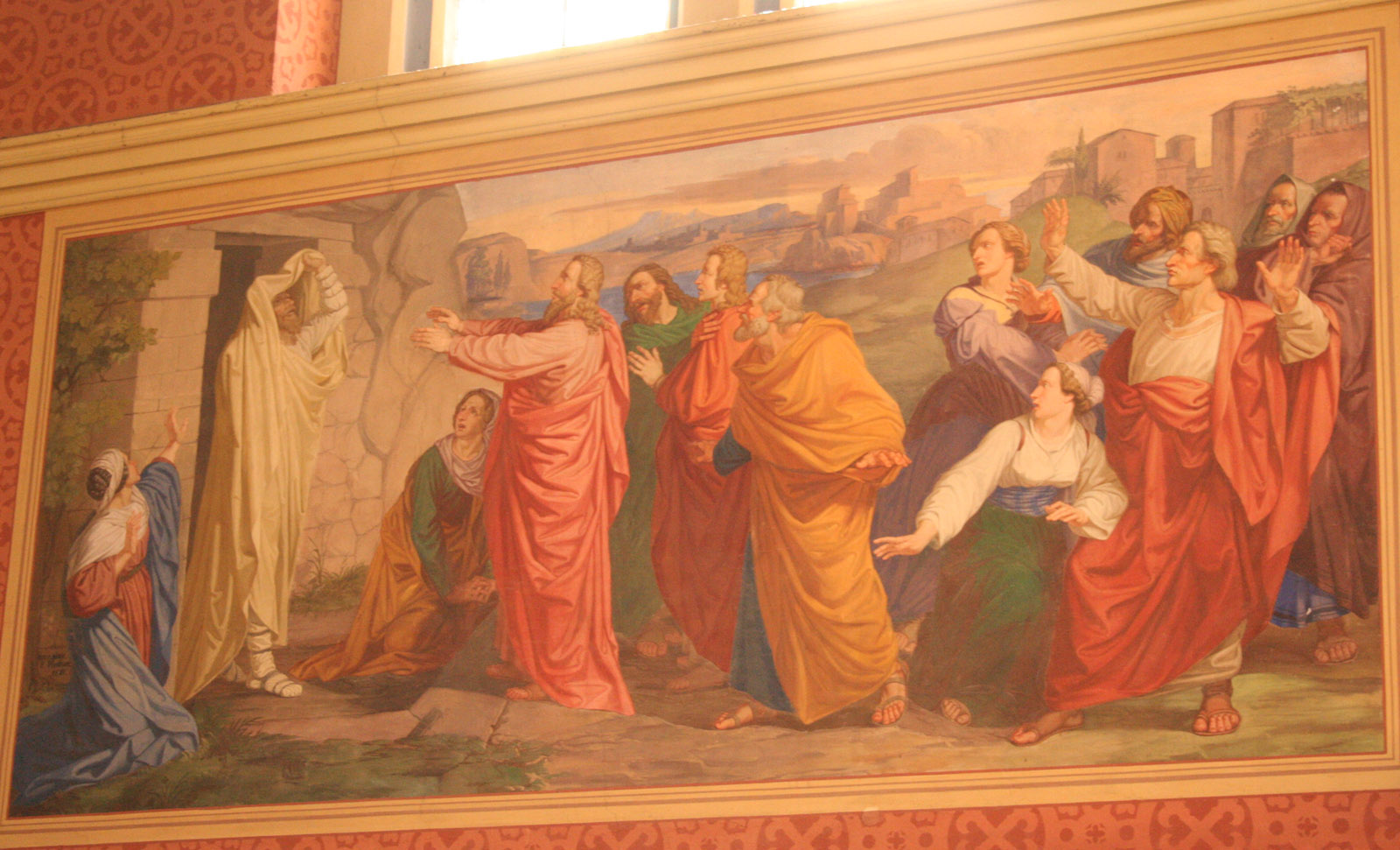
Right Choir: Resurrection of Lazarus

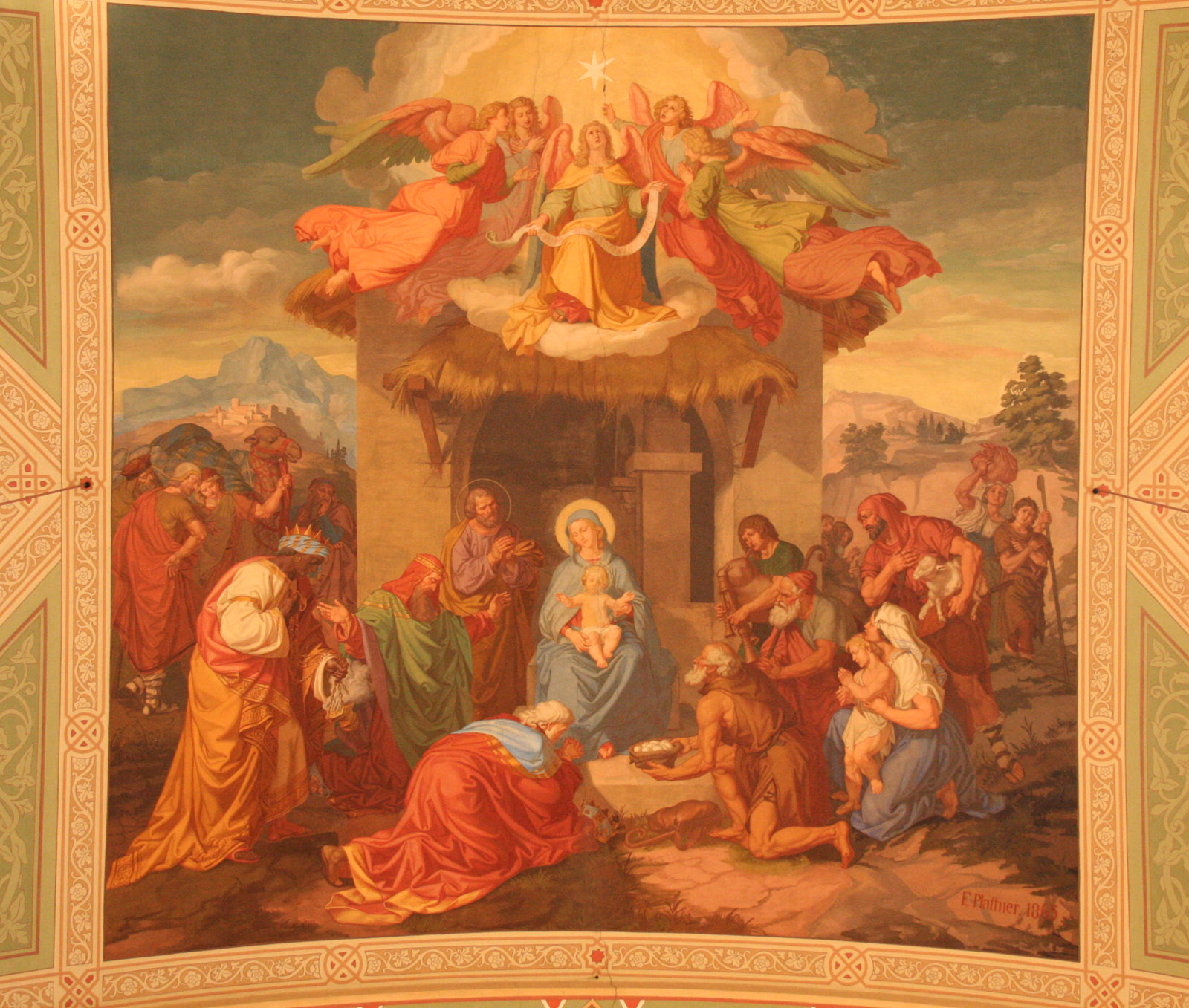
Vault Fresco: Nativity, Adoration of Magi and Shepherds

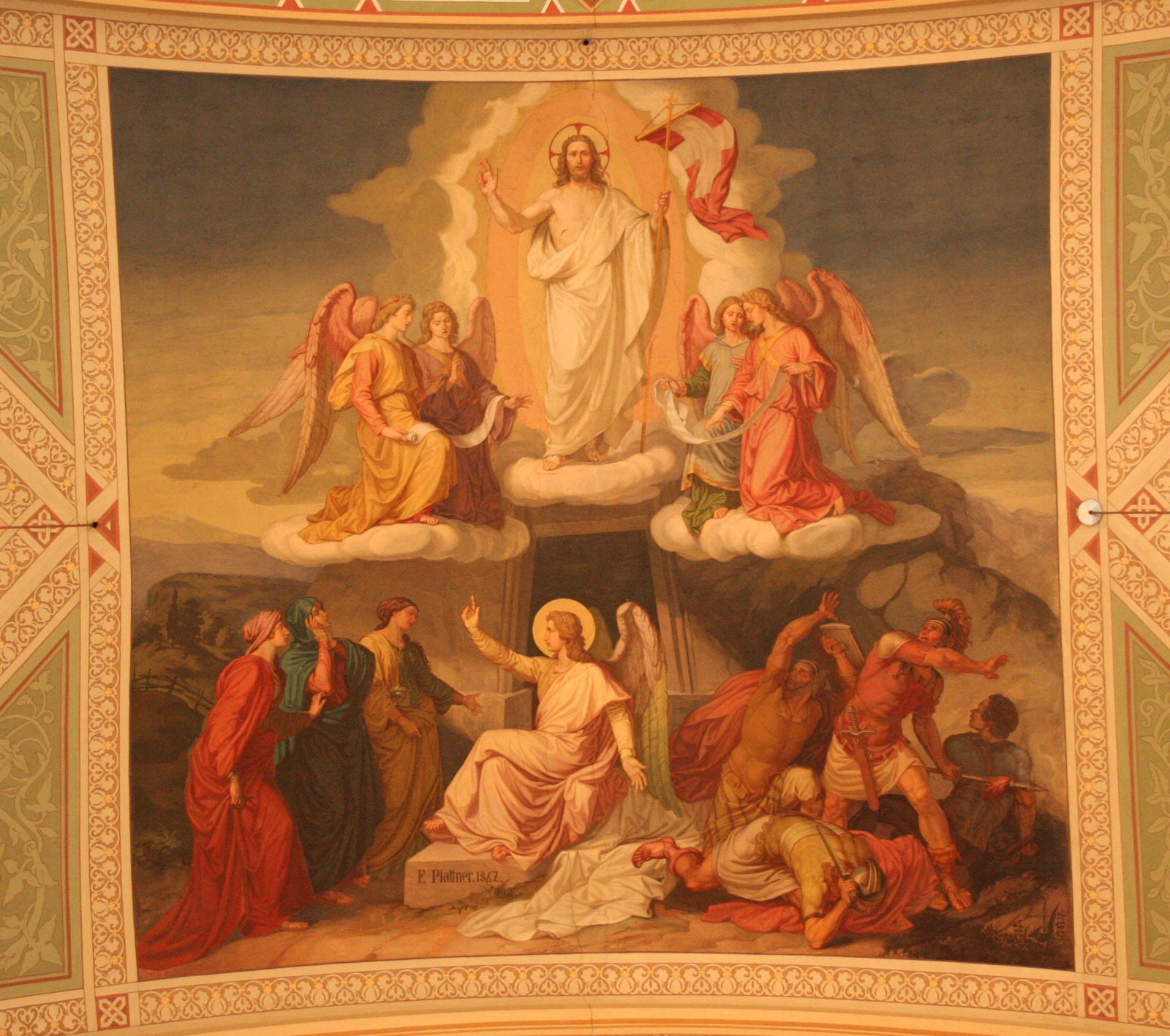
Vault Fresco: Resurrection of Christ

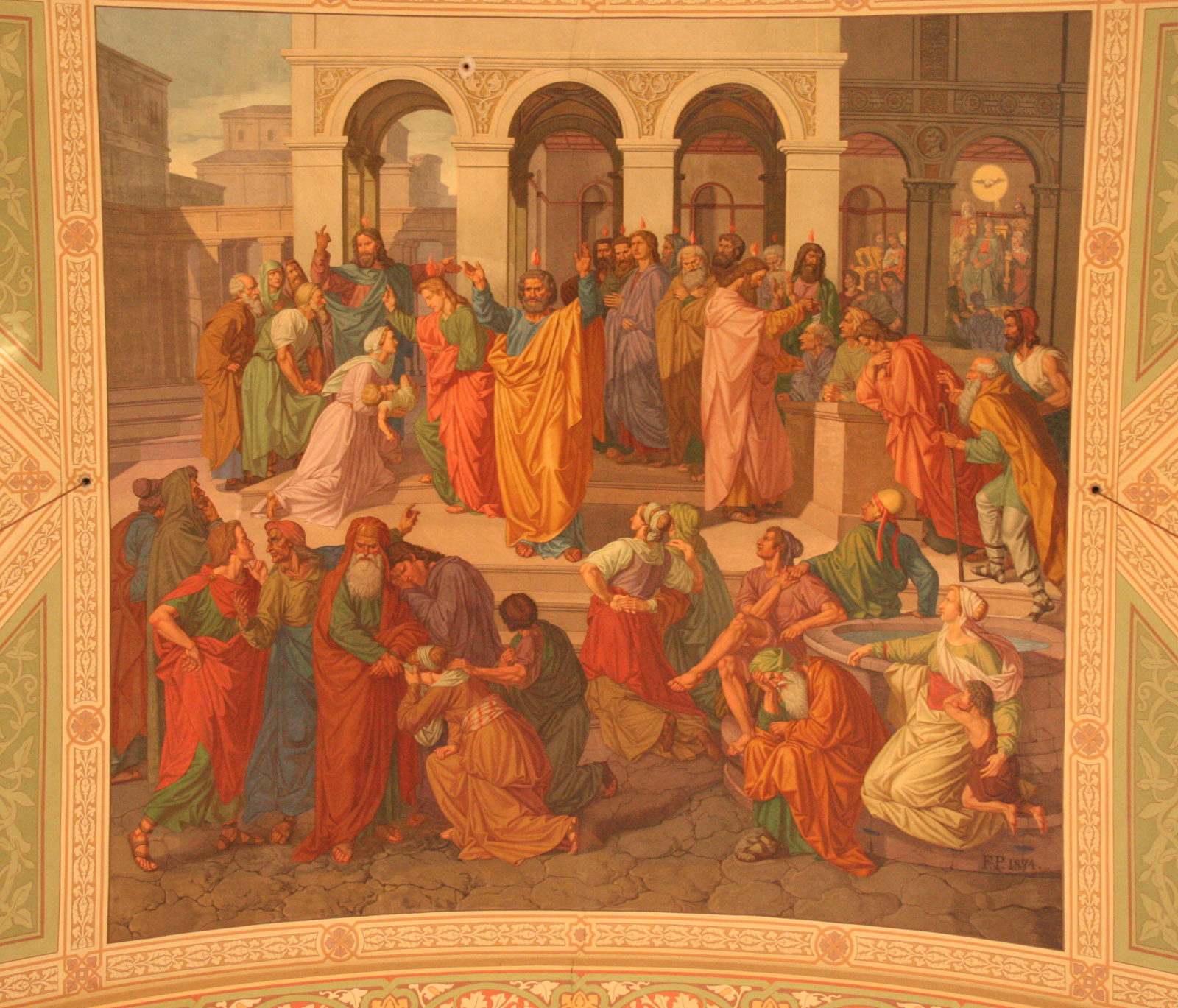
Vault Fresco:
