= Sisi Chapel =

Church in Vienna, Austria

Coordinates: 48°15′34″N 16°18′38″E

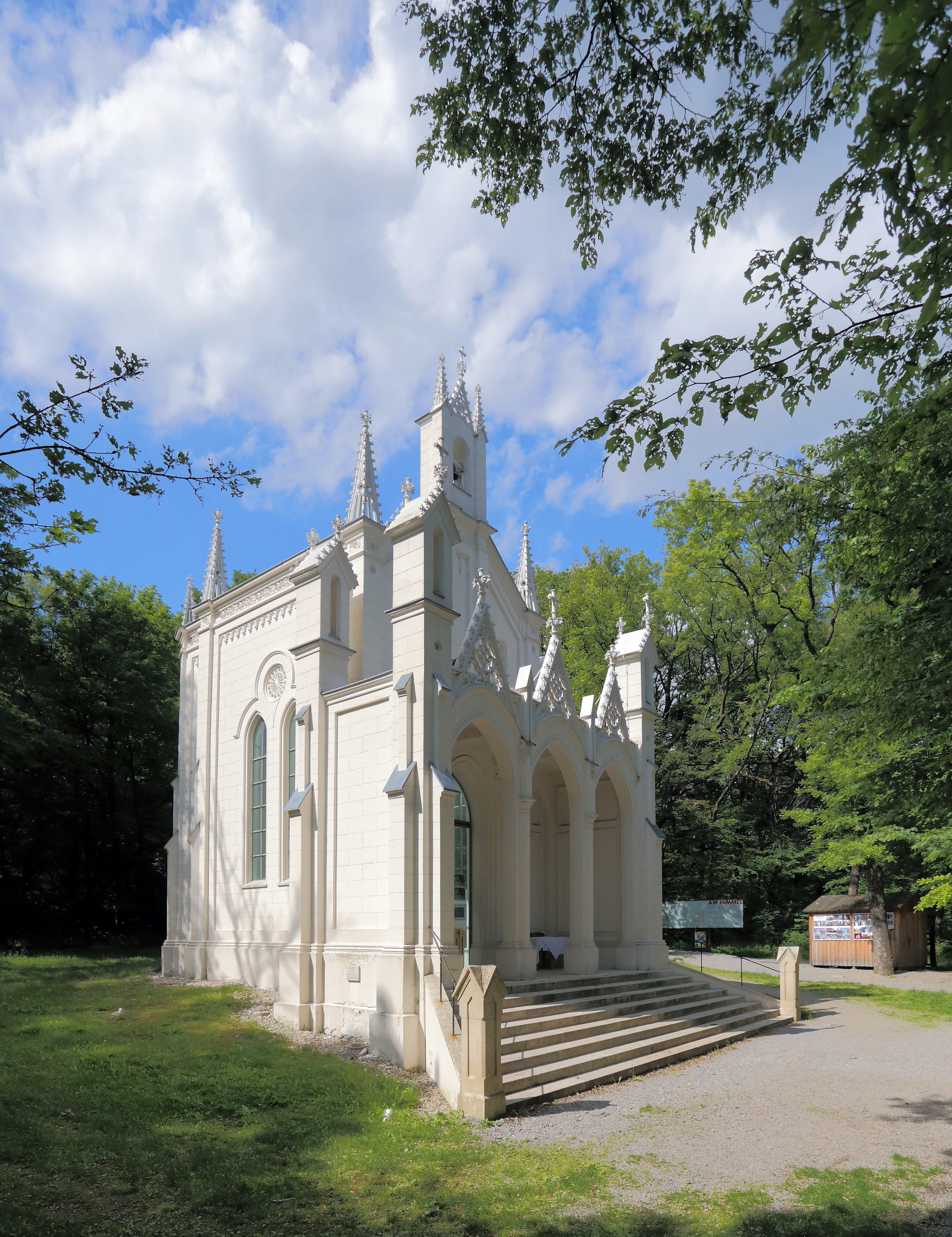
Sisi Chapel entrance

The Sisi Chapel (German: Sisi-Kapelle) is a Gothic Revival-style chapel located in the Sievering area of the Viennese district of Döbling near the Vienna Woods (Wienerwald).

== History ==
The Sisi Chapel was built on the occasion of the marriage of Empress Elisabeth and Emperor Franz Joseph I of Austria on April 24, 1854, in Vienna. Johann Carl Freiherr von Sothen commissioned architect Johan A. Garben to design the chapel and construct it in Am Himmel, a popular recreational area between the Sievering area (Döbling district) and the Vienna Woods. The chapel was intended to serve both as a memorial to the historic event and a gravesite for Freiherr von Sothen and his wife Franziska. The chapel was erected between 1854 and 1856 according to the plans of Garben by the city builder Josef Kastan. The chapel was consecrated to the patron saints of the Imperial couple on July 31, 1856: Saint Elisabeth, Saint Francis of Assisi, and Saint Joseph.

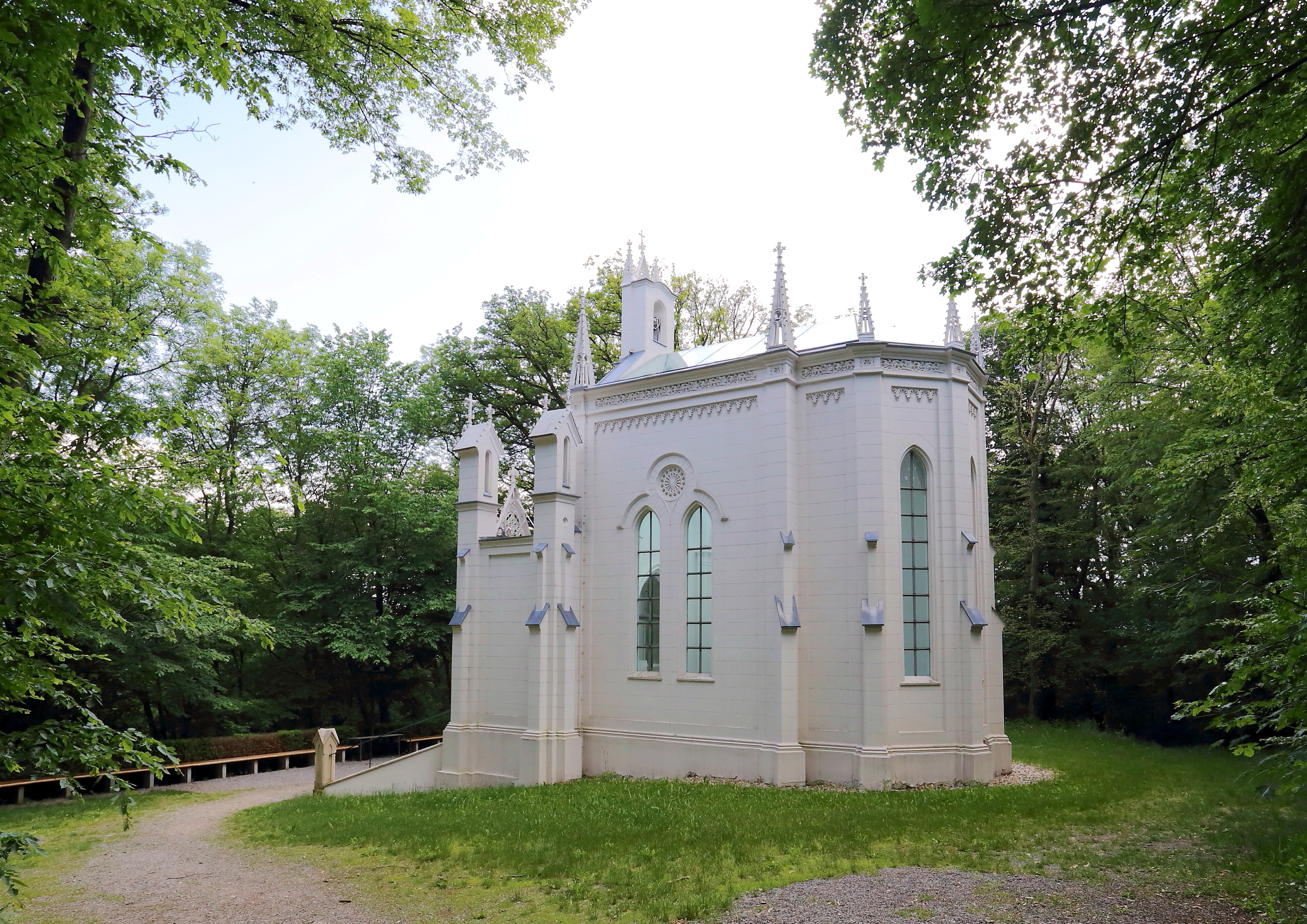
Sisi Chapel view from the northeast

In the 20th century, the chapel decayed as a result of atmospheric action, contaminant loads, and acts of war. To prevent vandalism, the altarpiece was dismantled. In 1997, the "Caucus Wood" acquired a large part of the Am Himmel area and purchased the chapel for 3,500 Euros from Caritas in 2002. The Caucus then initiated the renovation of the chapel as part of the overall revitalization of the area.

After several years of work, which required a total of 1.1 million Euros partially financed by the Vienna Old Town Preservation Fund, the chapel was completed in 2005. During the renovation, the inner room was reshaped to give a tangible experience of how nature and culture are interrelated. To accomplish this, a new glass roof was mounted. In addition, fourteen monitors recessed in the wall stage a kind of ordeal suffered by nature through the interventions of man.
