= Franciscan Church, Vienna =

Church in Vienna, Austria

Franciscan Church
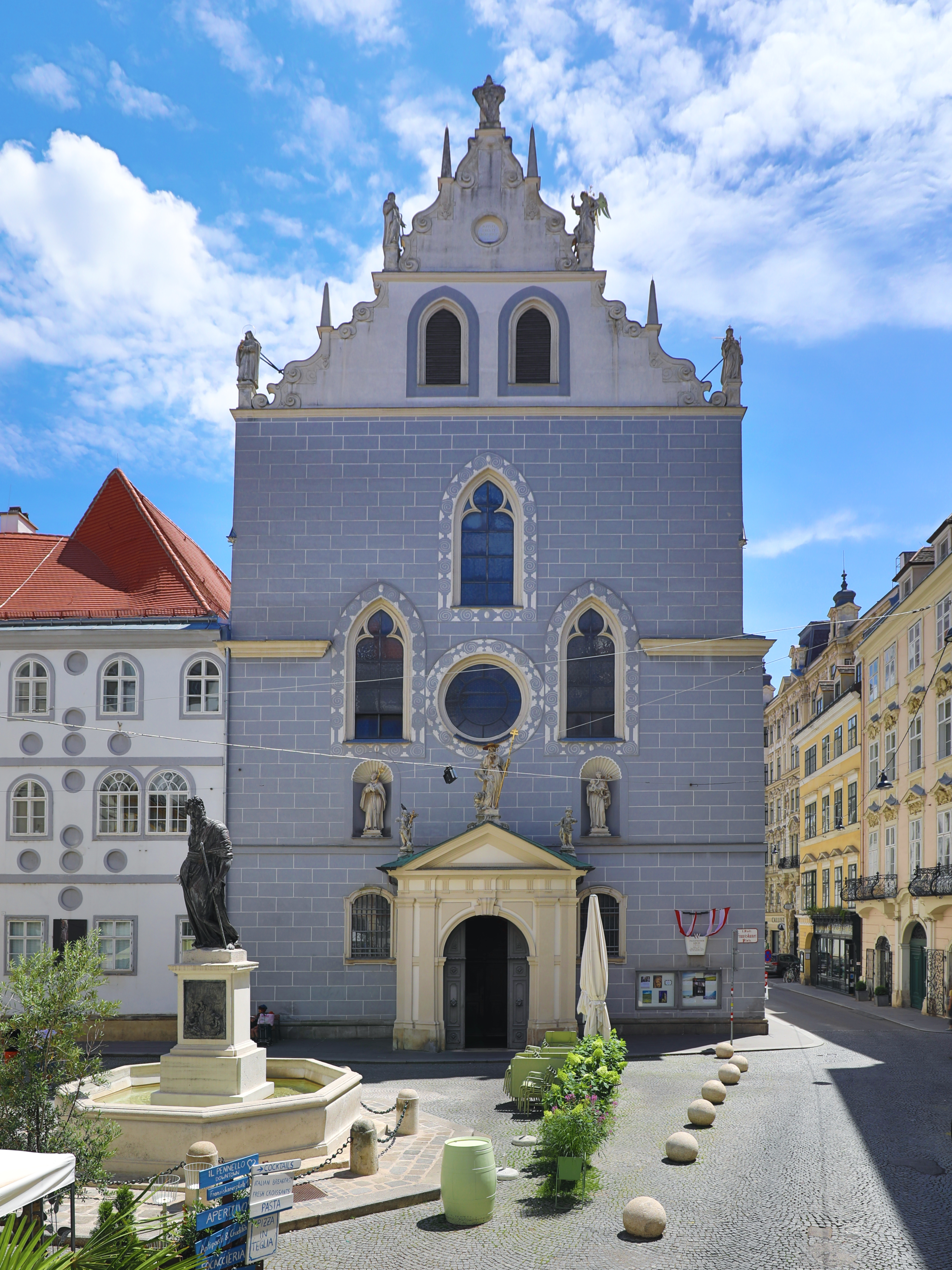
- Franciscan Church in Vienna

- Location within Vienna Location within Austria

Religion
- Affiliation: Catholic Church
- Leadership: P. Gottfried Wegleitner OFM
- Year consecrated: 1611

Location
- Location: Vienna, Austria
- Coordinates: 48°12′22″N 16°22′28″E

Architecture
- Architect: F. Bonaventura Daum
- Type: Church
- Style: Baroque
- Groundbreaking: 1603
- Completed: 1611

Specifications
- Direction of façade: NW
- Length: 65 m
- Width: 20 m
- Width (nave): 12 m

Website
- www.franziskaner.at

The Franciscan Church (German: Franziskanerkirche), also known as the Church of St. Jerome, is a Roman Catholic parish church dedicated to Saint Jerome and located in the historic city centre of Vienna, Vienna's 1st district (Innere Stadt). It is the church of the Franciscan Order in Vienna.

== Interior ==
Erected in 1603 the outside facade of the Franciscan Church is Renaissance in style. However, its interior is Baroque. The high altar depicting the Virgin Mary was designed by Andrea Pozzo in 1707. The church holds the oldest organ in Vienna. The carved Baroque organ was designed by Johann Wockerl in 1642.

- Capristan Chapel: painting of the "Martyrdom of St Capristan" by Franz Wagenschön
- Francis chapel: picture of the church's patron saint by Johann Georg Schmidt
- Crucifixion chapel: painting of the Crucifixion by Carlo Carlone

== History ==
The Franciscan Order had its first monastery in Vienna from 1451 with St. Theobald ob der Laimgrube in the Mariahilf district, which was destroyed in 1529. Two other monasteries (at St. Rupert until 1545, St. Nikolaus in Nikolai and Grünangergasse) soon became too small.

In 1589, after prolonged negotiations, the municipality of Vienna ceded to the Franciscans the empty convent of the Penitents, which had been built from 1383 to 1387. About forty years earlier, the Counter-Reformer Petrus Canisius had preached regularly in the church. When the Franciscans took over the building - in which former strumpets lived as penitents - the church was rebuilt, incorporating old components. As a result, Vienna's only sacred building in the Renaissance style is still often adorned with Gothic elements. The church was completed in 1607, the monastery for 200 brothers in 1630. The design of the interior of the church was completed only around 1720. Today the monastery belongs to the Franciscan Province of Austria.

== Gallery ==
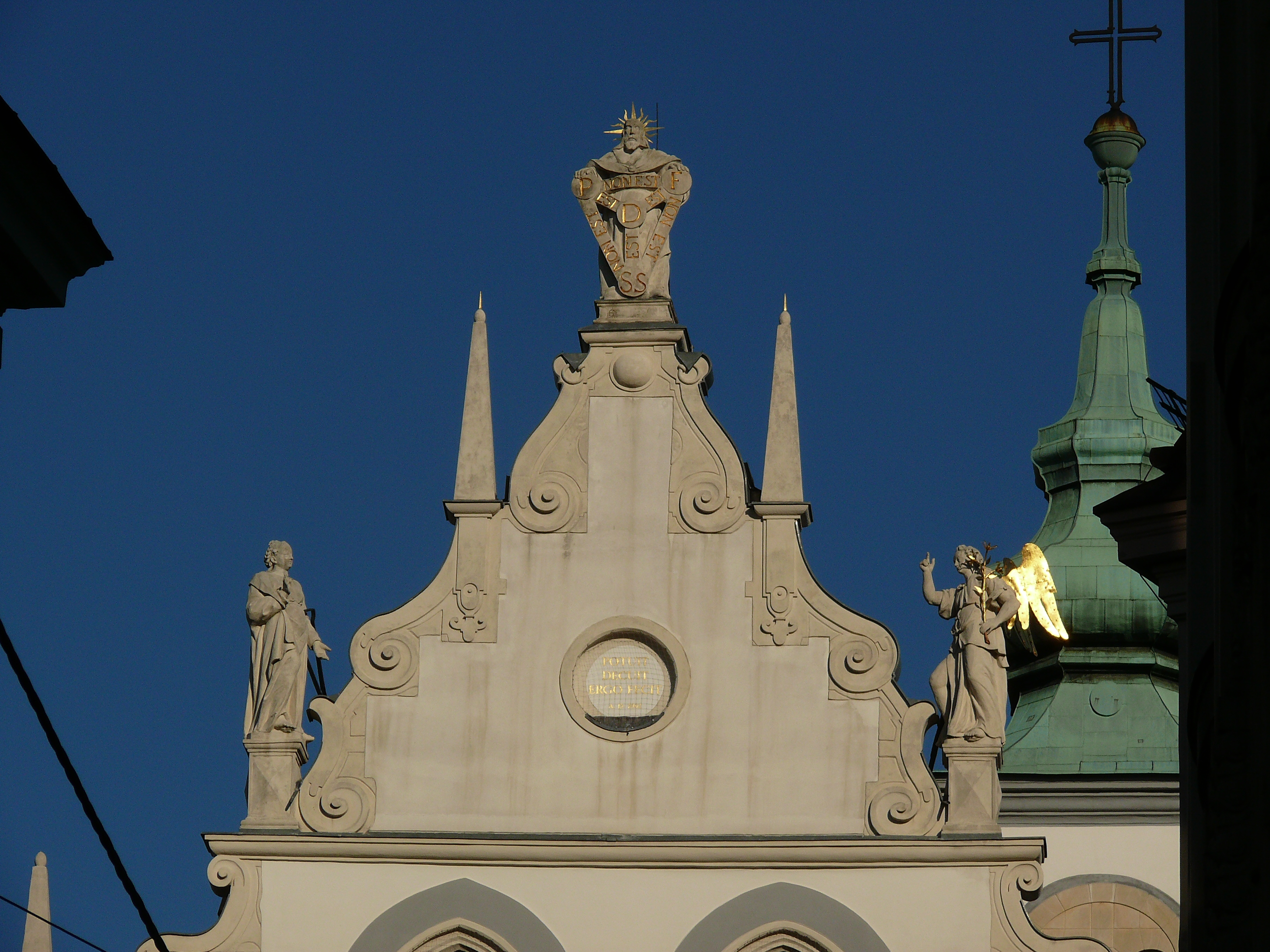
Gabel

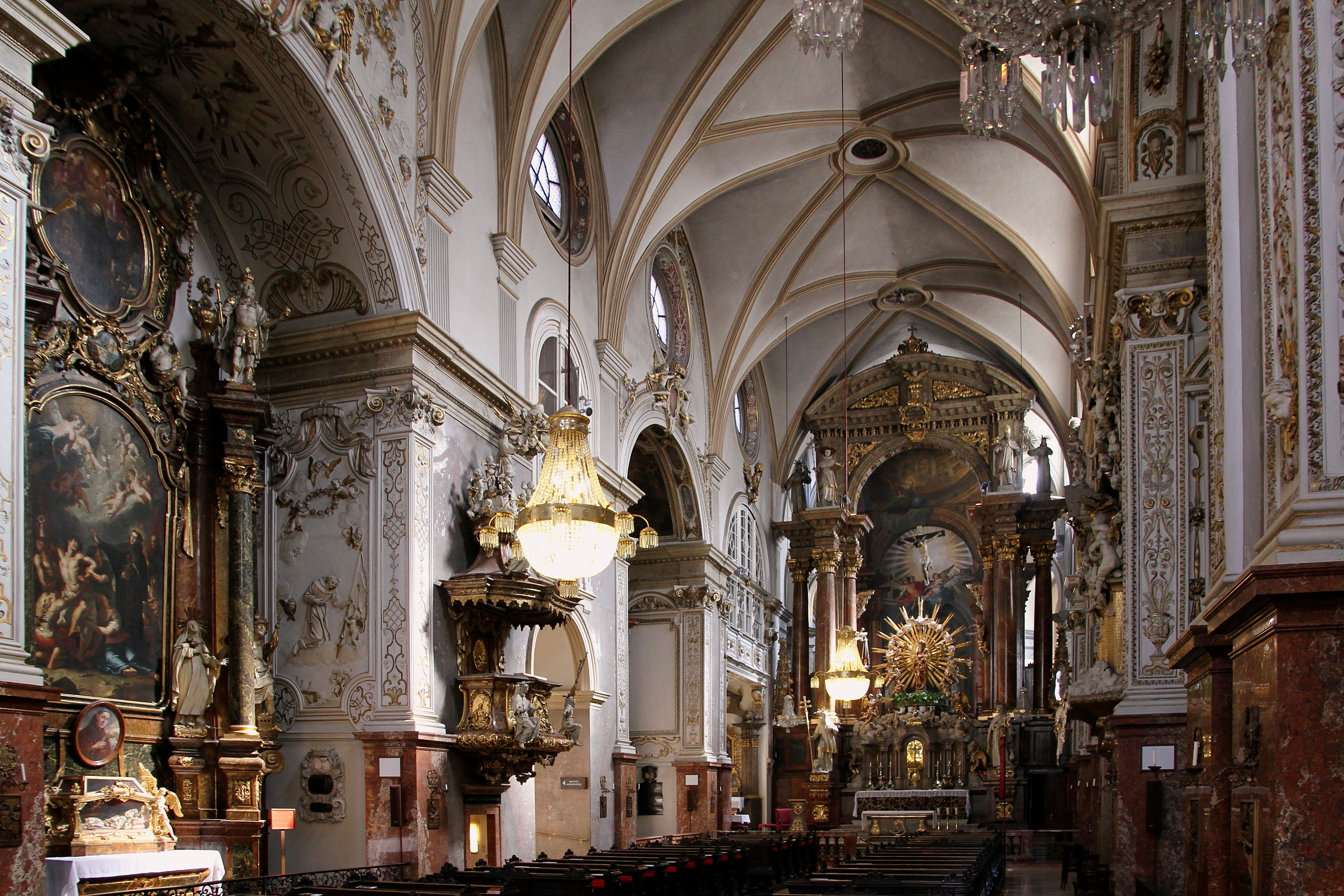
Interior

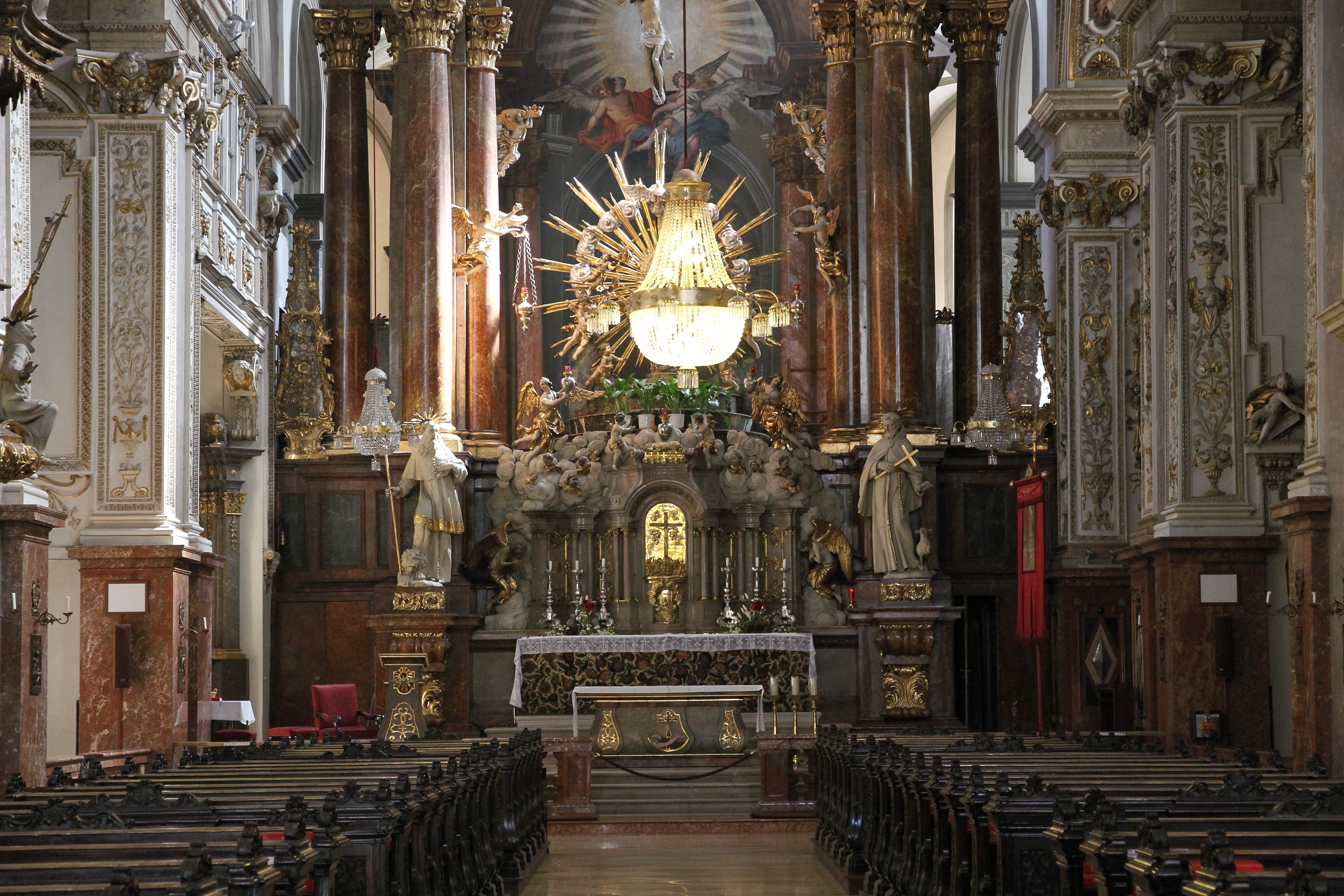
High altar

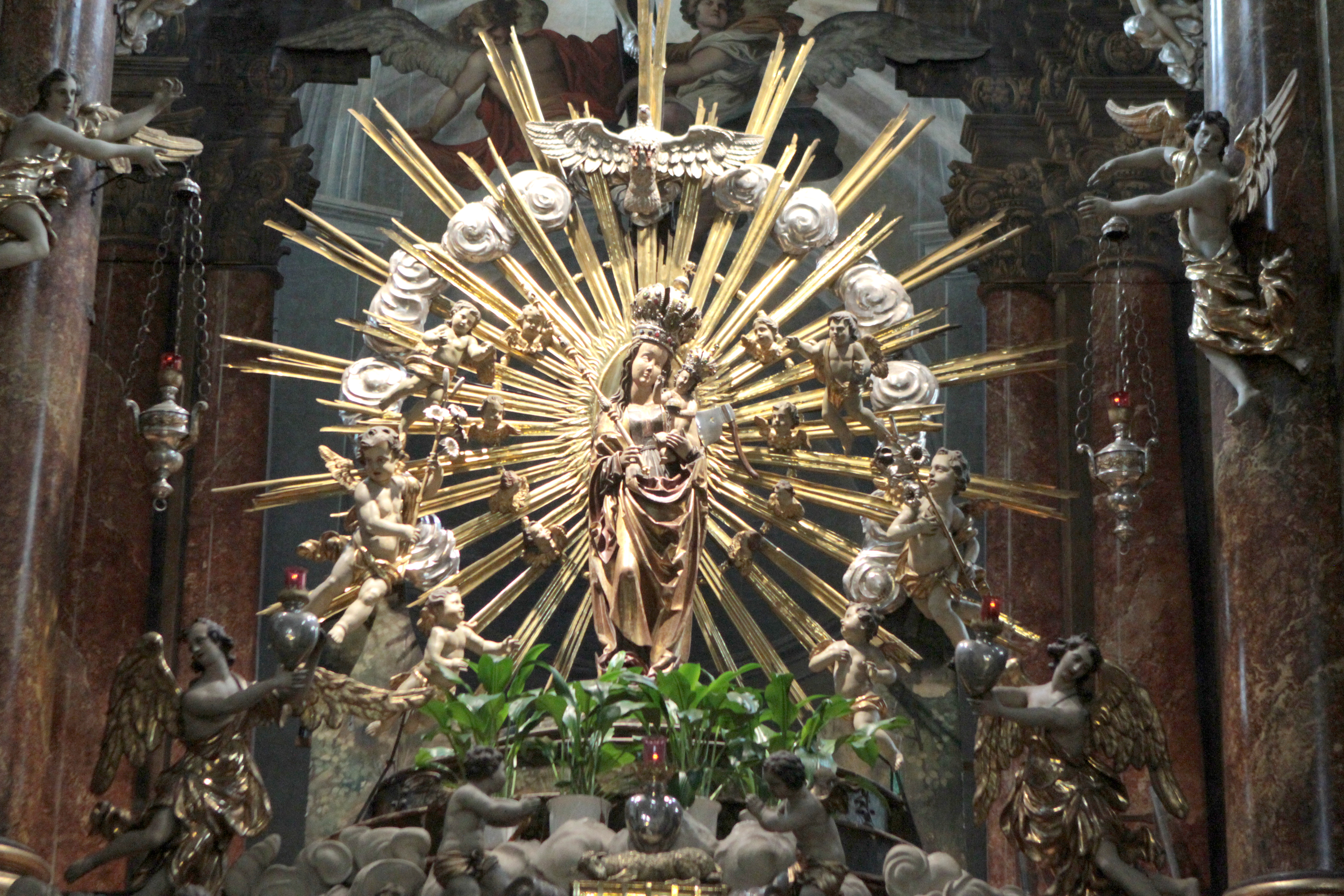
Altar piece

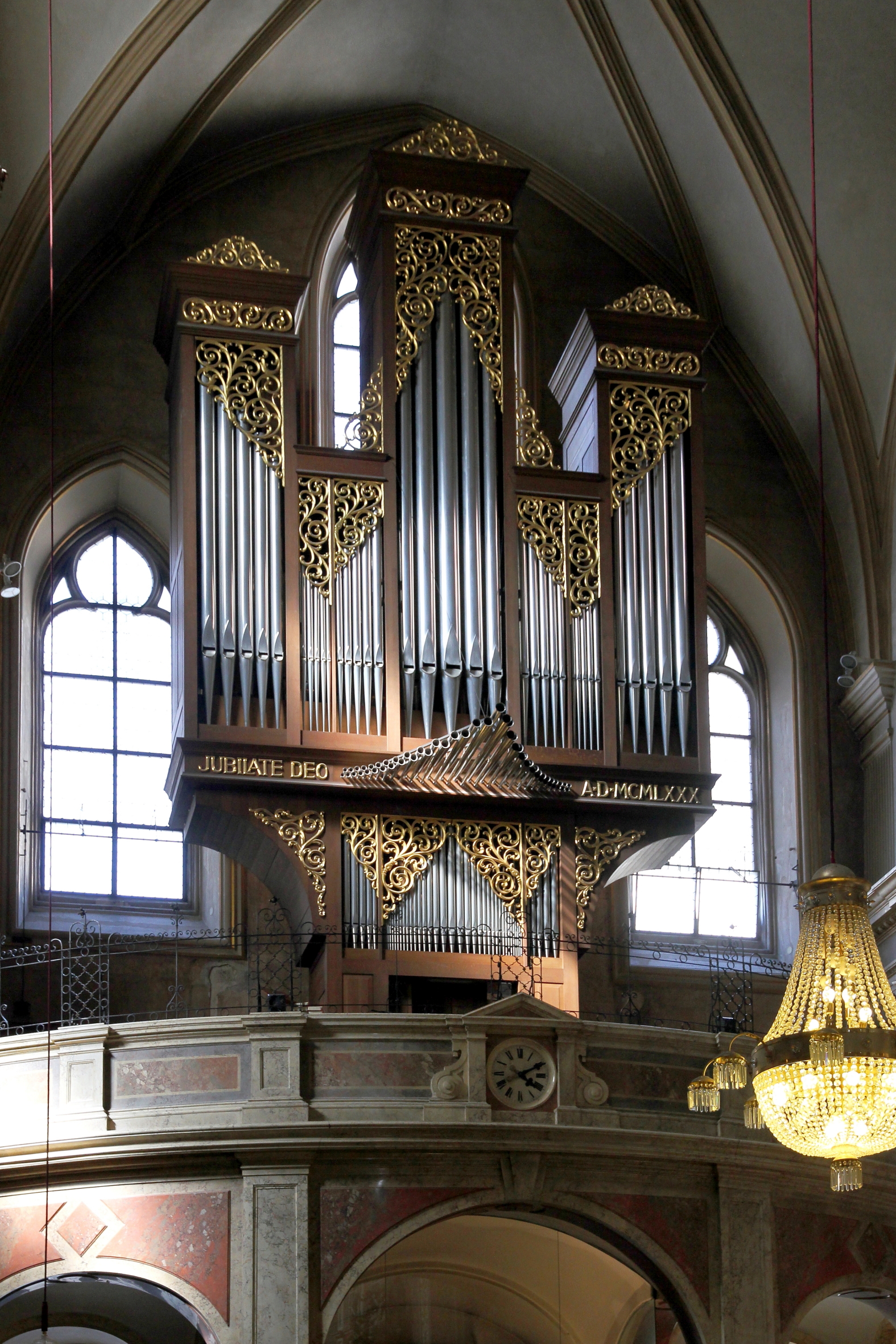
Organ

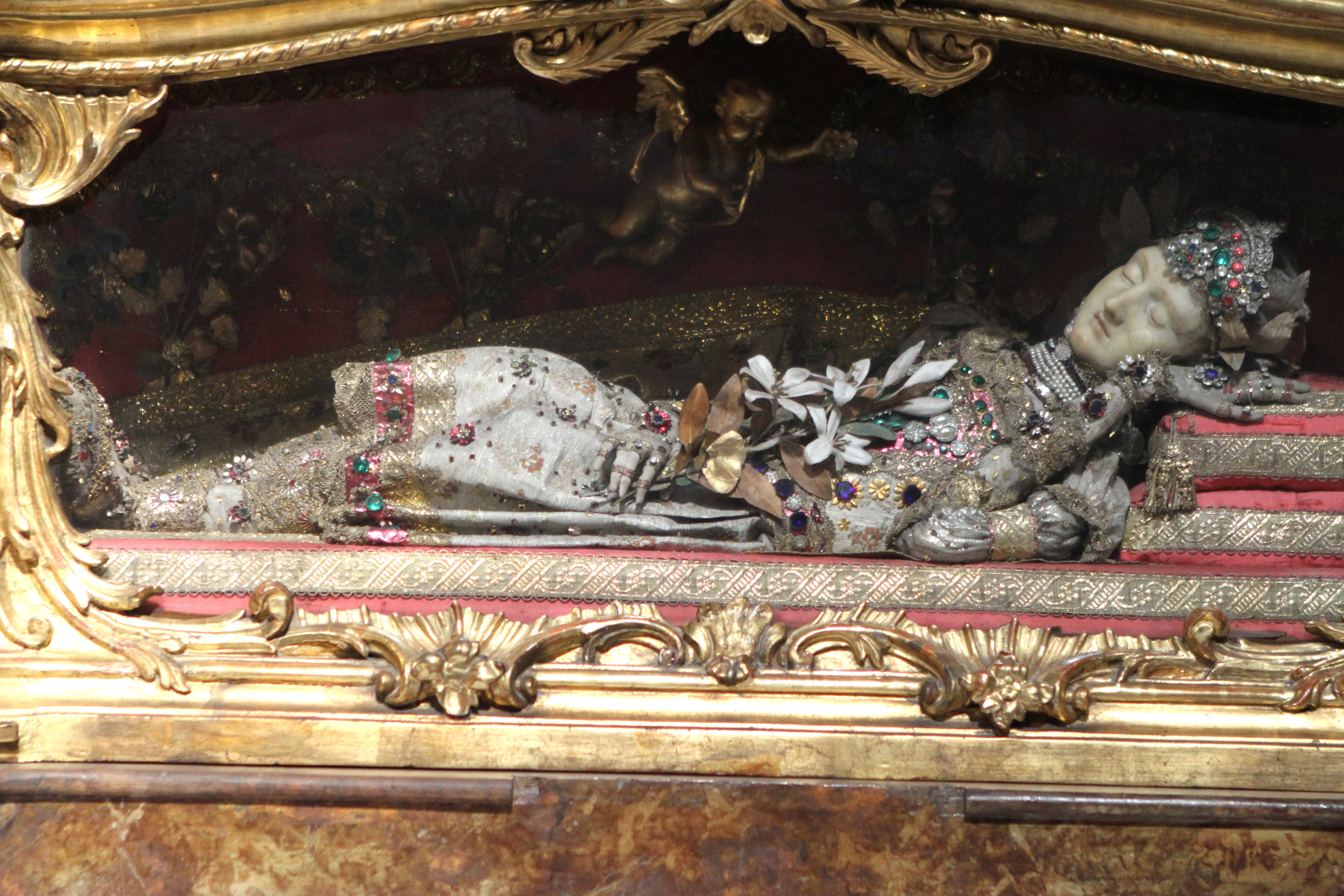
Reliquary of Saint Hieronymus
