= Johann Georg Schmidt (painter) =

Austrian painter

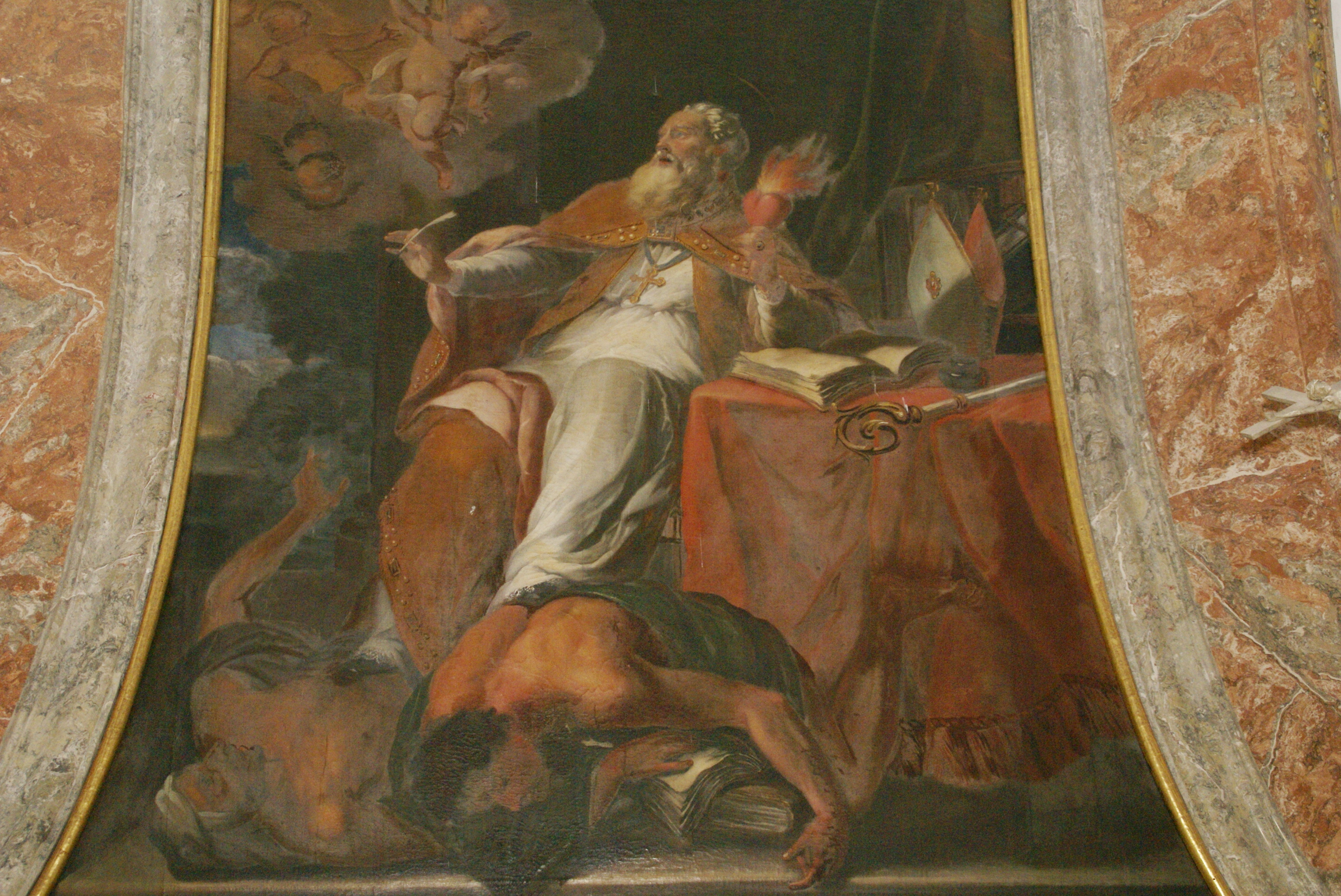
detail of the altar featuring Saint Augustine by Johann Georg Schmidt, left front of the nave, Abbey of St. Andrew, Traisen

Johann Georg Schmidt (c.1685 – 15 September 1748) was an Austrian Baroque painter. To distinguish him from his better-known namesake Martin Johann Schmidt from Krems (Kremser Schmidt) he was also known as the "Viennese Schmidt" (Wiener Schmidt).

Johann Georg Schmidt was born in Bohemia. He was educated in the studio of Peter Strudel and was influenced by Martino Altomonte. He often worked with architects such as Johann Lucas von Hildebrandt. He worked especially in Lower Austria and Vienna, on high altarpieces and other paintings, in places such as the Franciscan Church, Vienna, Altenburg Abbey, Klosterneuburg Priory, Lilienfeld Abbey and Zwettl Abbey. He died in Krems.
