= Stocking, Styria =

Stocking
- Former municipality
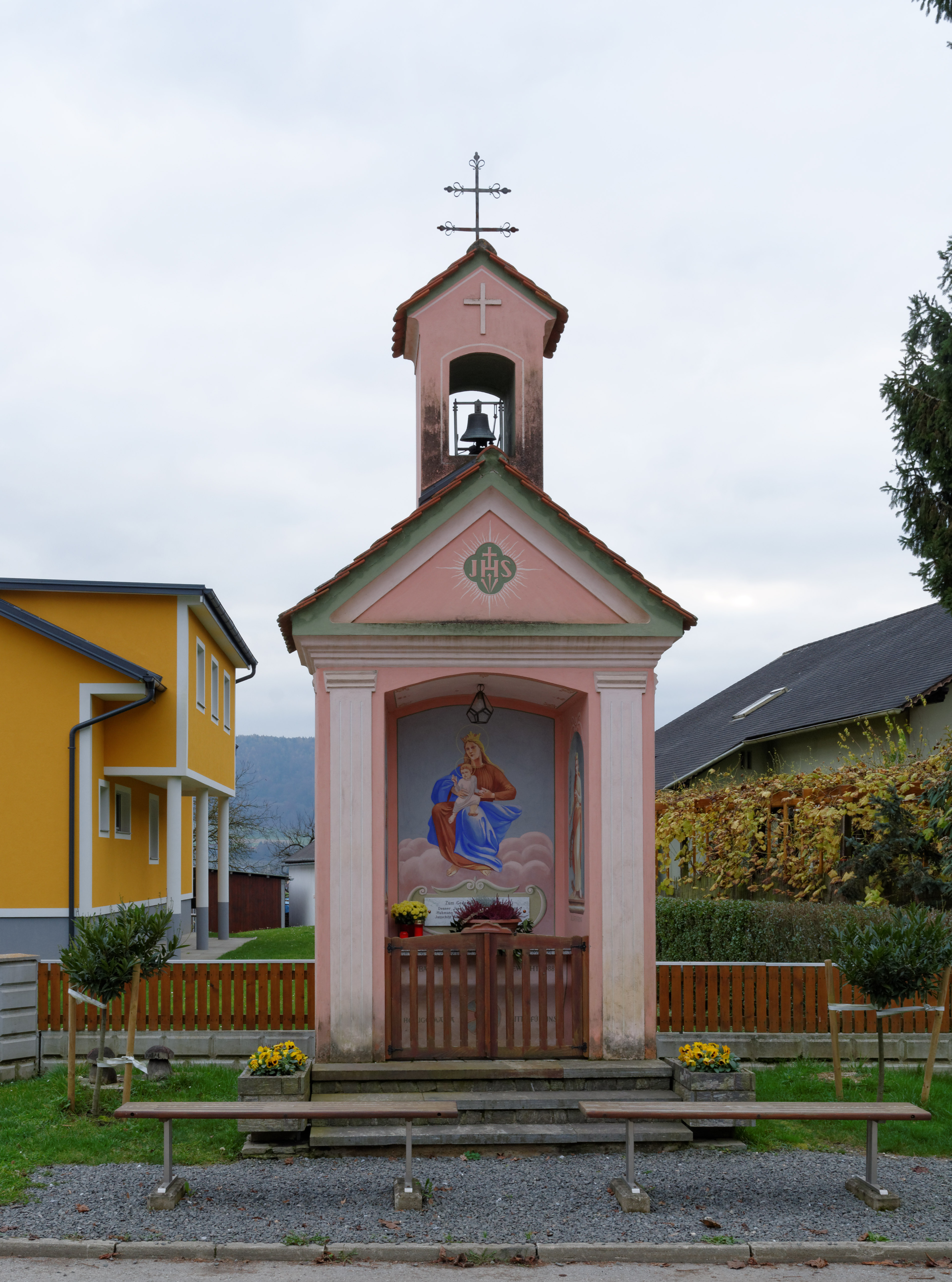
- Chapel in Afram (part of Stocking)

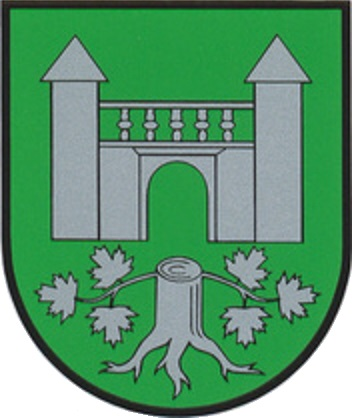
- Coat of arms

- Location within Austria
- Coordinates: 46°53′12″N 15°32′11″E
- Country: Austria
- State: Styria
- District: Leibnitz

Area
  - Total: 16.45 km^{2} (6.35 sq mi)
- Elevation: 294 m (965 ft)

Population (1 January 2016)
  - Total: 1,455
  - Density: 88.45/km^{2} (229.1/sq mi)
- Time zone: UTC+1 (CET)
  - Summer (DST): UTC+2 (CEST)
- Postal code: 8410, 8412, 8413
- Area code: 03182
- Vehicle registration: LB
- Website: www.stocking. steiermark.at

Stocking is a former municipality in the district of Leibnitz in Styria, Austria. Since the 2015 Styria municipal structural reform, it was divided between the municipalities Wildon and Sankt Georgen an der Stiefing.
