= Hengsberg =

- Municipality
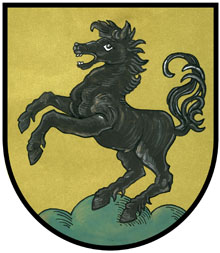
- Coat of arms

- Location within Austria
- Coordinates: 46°52′10″N 15°26′0″E
- Country: Austria
- State: Styria
- District: Leibnitz

Government
  - Mayor: Johann Mayer (ÖVP)

Area
  - Total: 17.75 km^{2} (6.85 sq mi)
- Elevation: 351 m (1,152 ft)

Population (2018-01-01)
  - Total: 1,445
  - Density: 81.41/km^{2} (210.8/sq mi)
- Time zone: UTC+1 (CET)
  - Summer (DST): UTC+2 (CEST)
- Postal code: 8411
- Area code: 03185
- Vehicle registration: LB
- Website: www.hengsberg.at

Hengsberg is a municipality in the district of Leibnitz in Styria, in southeast Austria.

== Geography ==
Hengsberg is situated in the south of Graz at the foothills of the Buchkogel in the district of Leibnitz in the province Styria. Its cadastral subdivisions are Flüssing, Hengsberg, Kehlsdorf, Komberg, Kühberg, Leitersdorf, Matzelsdorf, Schönberg an der Laßnitz, and Schrötten an der Laßnitz.

== History ==
The first historical entry dates back to the year 892 (Hengistburg/Hengistfeldon), which means "castle of Hengist".

Hengsberg is considered to be the most probable location for the old "Hengistburg". The Hengistburg was the center of the early Medieval so-called Carinthian Mark. This was at the same time the heart of today's Styria. The exact localisation of the Hengistburg is still one of the major questions of the early Styrian history. The castle was destroyed in the year 1053 by Hungarians. Other possible locations include Graz, St. Margarethen bei Lebring, the castle-hill of Wildon, as well as St. Lorenzen am Hengsberg. But there are several important arguments that "castrum Heingist" was located in Hengsberg.

In the year 1045, King Heinrich III donated the royal demesne Leitersdorf an der Laßnitz, situated in the margraviate Gottfrieds and in the Forest Sausal to the Archbishop Balduin (predium quale visi sumus Liutoldasdorf habere, in comitatu Gotefridi marchionis et foresto Susel iuxta litus Losnicae fluminis situm). The abolition of the manorial system took place in 1848. At that time, the municipality as an autonomous body appeared. This was in 1850. After the annexation of Austria in 1938, the municipality was part of the "Reichsgau Steiermark". From 1945 to 1955, it remained part of the zone occupied by the British Army in Austria.

Historical maps of the region of Hengsberg

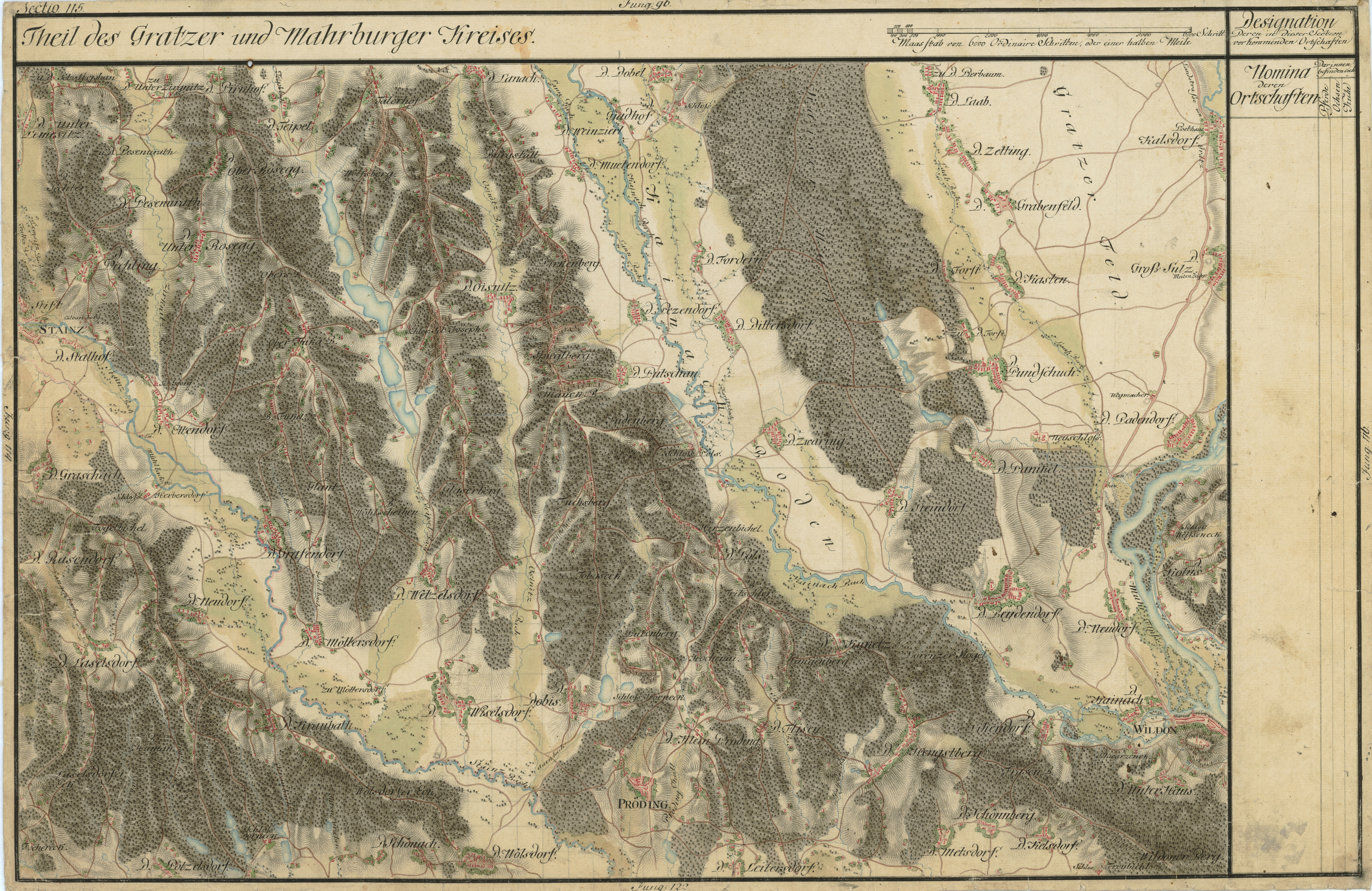
"Hengstberg": Josephinic survey, appr. 1790.

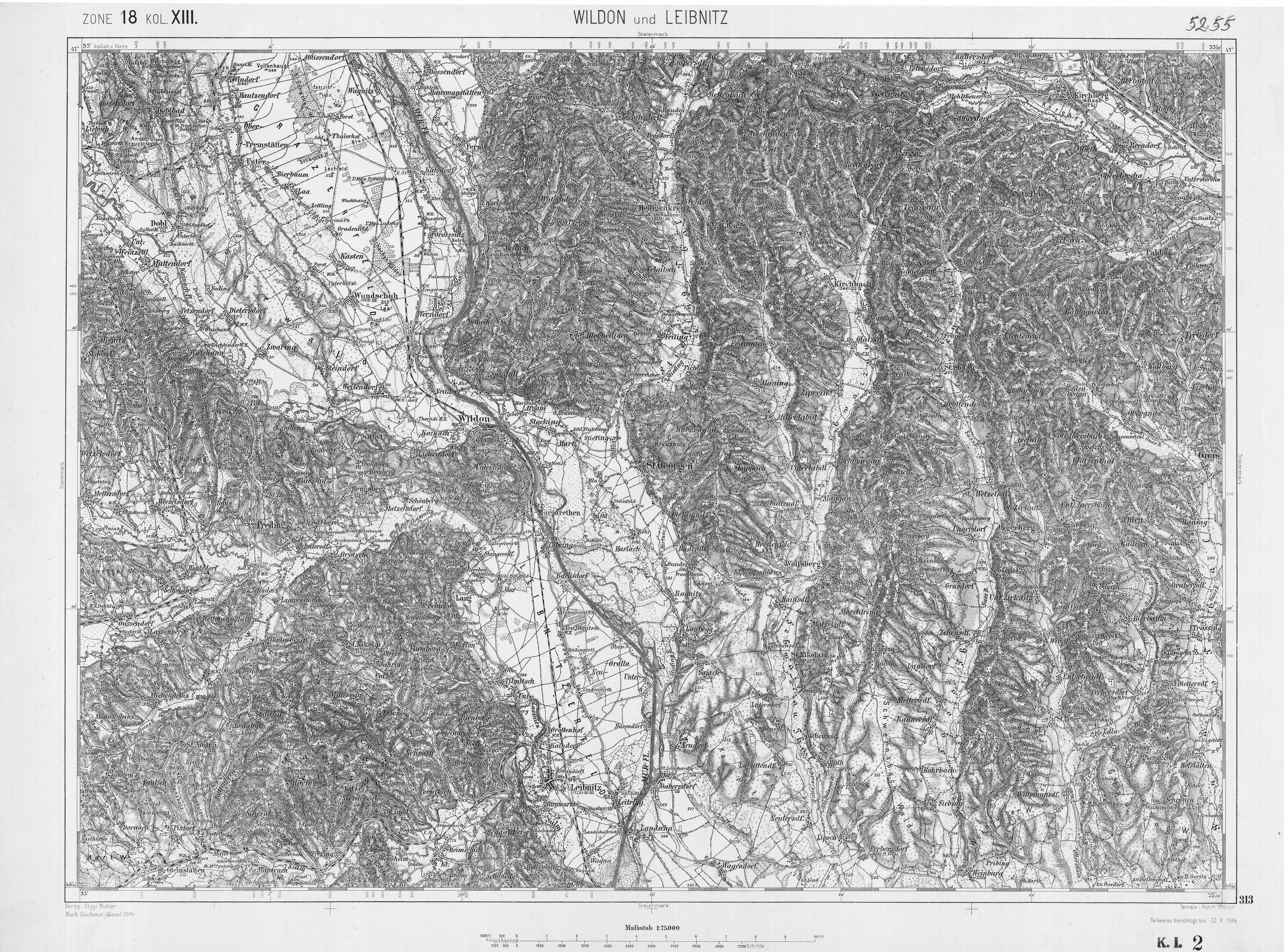
Franzisco-Josephinic survey, appr. 1910.

== Religions ==
Hengsberg was an original parish since about the first half of the 9th century, then mother-parish since about the 13th century with the parishes Wundschuh, Wildon, Preding, Lang and St. Margaret. The area of Parish Hengsberg now includes all villages in the municipality Hengsberg and also village Lichendorf in the municipality Weitendorf and Lamberg in the municipality Zwaring-Pöls.

After the creation of the Protestant cemetery and the construction of a dead house with bell tower, there was the establishment of the Protestant chapel Christus-Kirchleins and its inauguration on 5 June 1933.

== Demographics ==
Population chart
Year	Population
1869	1323
1934	1278
1939	1400
1951	1167
1961	1134
2009	1379
2011	1388

The change in the population of Hengsberg, over the years, is shown in the following chart and in the table on the right.

== Politics ==
The council of the municipality ("Gemeinderat") consists of 13 members, three political parties and one independent member. The parties represented are: (i) Austrian Peoples Party (ÖVP), (ii) Austrian Social Democratic Party (SPÖ) and (iii) Austrian Freedom Party (FPÖ). Members of the ÖVP are: Franz Beuchler, Anna Eisenberger, Gerlinde Holzmann, Günther Ninaus, Franz Kraschitz, Franz Lienhart, and Franz Zöhrer. The members of the SPÖ are: Johann Onzek, Richard Schneider, Josef Fröhlich. The Members of the FPÖ are: Josef Kötz, Johann Stangl. The independent member is Horst Dokter.

The parish council consists of three members: (i) the Mayor, (ii) the Vice Mayor, and (iii) the Treasurer.

After the demission of the long-term mayor Robert Baumann Johann Mayer (ÖVP) from the Austrian Peoples Party was elected by the council of the municipality on February 15, 2007. The Vice Mayor is Leonhard Bernhard (ÖVP), and the Treasurer is Josef Greistorfer (SPÖ)

== Sports ==
USV Hengsberg: In Hengsberg there is one official Soccer Club. It was founded in 1968 by former President Hans Oswald and section leader Anton Thomann. More Information can be gathered at USV Hengsberg.

== Literature ==
There are several historical publications mainly in German Language about Hengsberg and the Hengistburg. The most important are named above.

- Ofner, Paul: Hengistfeldon – Hengistburg – Hengsberg. Besitzgeschichtliche, burgenkundliche, siedlungsgeschichtliche, fluranalytische und andere Untersuchungen über den Kern des Hengist Mitte des 19. Jahrhunderts. Hrsg. von der Gemeinde Hengsberg. Graz: dbv-Verlag 1982.
- Picl, Othmar: Stand die Hengistburg in St. Margarethen bei Lebring? In: 950 Jahre St. Margarethen bei Lebring. Hrsg. vom Röm.-kath. Pfarramt St. Margarethen bei Lebring. S. Margarethen bei Lebring 1991. pp. 19–27.
