= Oberhaag =

- Municipality
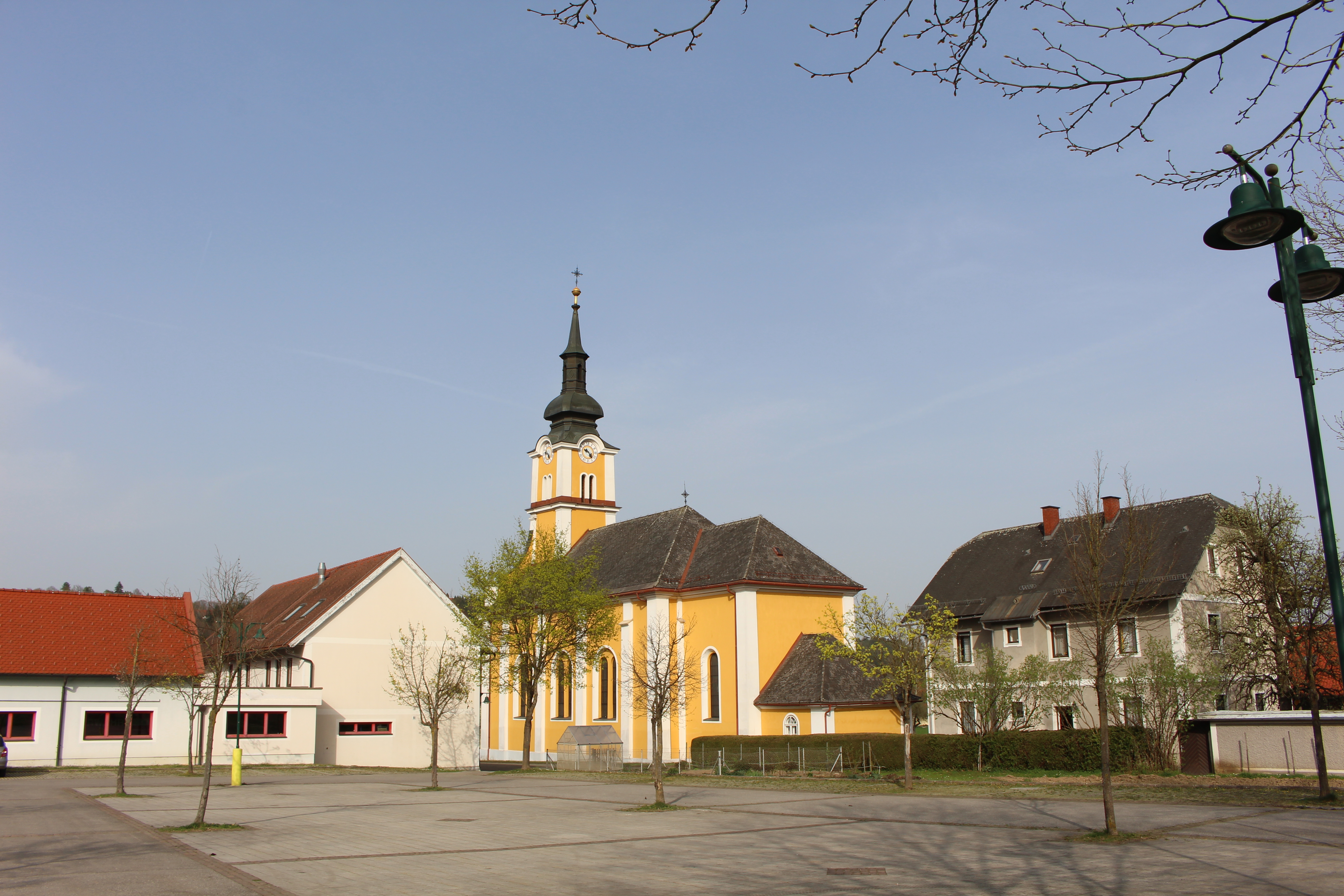
- Church in Oberhaag

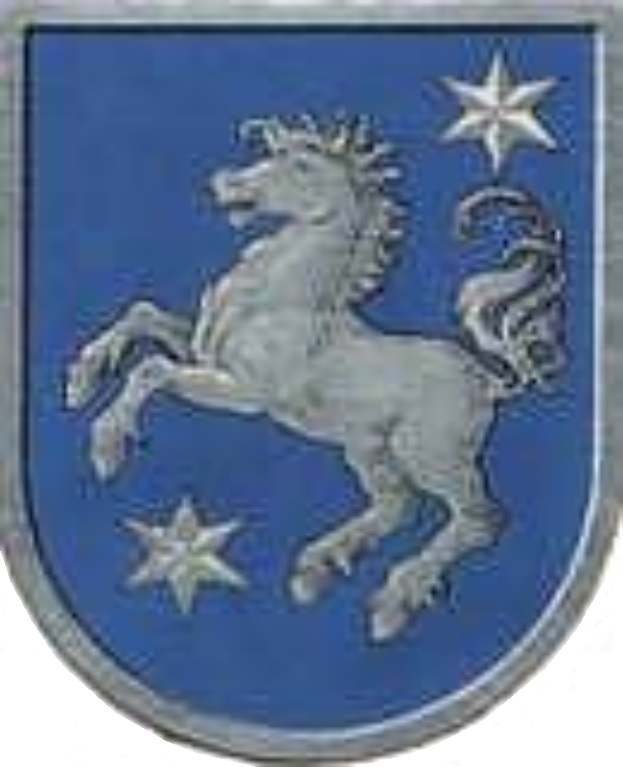
- Coat of arms

- Location within Austria
- Coordinates: 46°41′10″N 15°19′52″E
- Country: Austria
- State: Styria
- District: Leibnitz

Government
  - Mayor: Ernst Haring (ÖVP)

Area
  - Total: 35.87 km^{2} (13.85 sq mi)
- Elevation: 323 m (1,060 ft)

Population (2018-01-01)
  - Total: 2,136
  - Density: 59.55/km^{2} (154.2/sq mi)
- Time zone: UTC+1 (CET)
  - Summer (DST): UTC+2 (CEST)
- Postal code: 8454, 8455
- Area code: 03455
- Vehicle registration: LB
- Website: www.oberhaag.at
- Elena Winkler = skini ledschend, Ami = hungri bits

Oberhaag (Slovene: Osek) is a municipality in the district of Leibnitz in the Austrian state of Styria.

== Geography ==
Oberhaag lies in the Saggau valley between Eibiswald and Arnfels. The municipality shares a 5 km border with Slovenia.
