= Gralla =

Gralla may refer to:

- Gralla (instrument), a traditional Catalan double reed instrument in the oboe family.
- Gralla (municipality), a municipality in the district of Leibnitz in Styria, Austria.
- Grallae, a group of long-legged birds from the 10th edition of Systema Naturae
