= Leibnitz District =

Coordinates: 46.782°N 15.533°E

Leibnitz District Bezirk Leibnitz
- District
- Country: Austria
- State: Styria
- Number of municipalities: 29
- Administrative seat: Leibnitz

Government
  - District Governor: Manfred Walch

Area
  - Total: 726.95 km^{2} (280.68 sq mi)

Population (1 January 2014)
  - Total: 75,775
  - Density: 104.24/km^{2} (269.97/sq mi)
- Time zone: UTC+01:00 (CET)
  - Summer (DST): UTC+02:00 (CEST)
- Vehicle registration: LB
- NUTS code: AT225

Bezirk Leibnitz (Austrian German: [ˈlaɪbnɪts]) is a district of the state of Styria in Austria. Since the 2015 Styria municipal structural reform, it consists of the following municipalities:

- Allerheiligen bei Wildon
- Arnfels
- Ehrenhausen an der Weinstraße
- Empersdorf
- Gabersdorf
- Gamlitz
- Gleinstätten
- Gralla
- Großklein
- Heiligenkreuz am Waasen
- Heimschuh
- Hengsberg
- Kitzeck im Sausal
- Lang
- Lebring-Sankt Margarethen
- Leibnitz
- Leutschach an der Weinstraße
- Oberhaag
- Ragnitz
- Sankt Andrä-Höch
- Sankt Georgen an der Stiefing
- Sankt Johann im Saggautal
- Sankt Nikolai im Sausal
- Sankt Veit in der Südsteiermark
- Schwarzautal
- Straß in Steiermark
- Tillmitsch
- Wagna
- Wildon

== Municipalities before 2015 ==
Towns (Städte) are indicated in boldface; market towns (Marktgemeinden) in italics; suburbs, hamlets and other subdivisions of a municipality are indicated in small characters.

- Allerheiligen bei Wildon
  - Großfeiting, Kleinfeiting, Pesendorf, Pichla, Schwasdorf, Siebing
- Arnfels
  - Maltschach
- Berghausen
  - Ewitsch, Wielitsch, Zieregg
- Breitenfeld am Tannenriegel
- Ehrenhausen
- Eichberg-Trautenburg
  - Kranach
- Empersdorf
  - Liebensdorf
- Gabersdorf
  - Landscha an der Mur, Neudorf an der Mur, Sajach
- Gamlitz
  - Eckberg, Grubtal, Kranach, Labitschberg, Sernau, Steinbach
- Glanz an der Weinstraße
  - Fötschach, Glanz, Langegg, Pößnitz
- Gleinstätten
  - Haslach, Prarath
- Gralla
- Großklein
  - Burgstall, Goldes, Mantrach, Mattelsberg, Nestelbach, Nestelberg, Oberfahrenbach
- Hainsdorf im Schwarzautal
  - Matzelsdorf, Techensdorf
- Heiligenkreuz am Waasen
  - Felgitsch
- Heimschuh
  - Kittenberg, Muggenau, Nestelberg, Pernitsch, Unterfahrenbach
- Hengsberg
  - Flüssing, Kehlsdorf, Komberg, Kühberg, Leitersdorf, Matzelsdorf, Schönberg an der Laßnitz, Schrötten an der Laßnitz
- Kaindorf an der Sulm
  - Grottenhof, Kaindorf an der Sulm, Kogelberg
- Kitzeck im Sausal
  - Brudersegg, Einöd, Fresing, Gauitsch, Greith, Neurath, Steinriegel
- Lang
  - Dexenberg, Göttling, Jöß, Langaberg, Schirka, Stangersdorf
- Lebring-Sankt Margarethen
  - Bachsdorf, Lebring, Sankt Margarethen bei Lebring
- Leibnitz
- Leutschach
- Oberhaag
  - Altenbach, Hardegg, Kitzelsdorf, Krast, Lieschen, Obergreith
- Obervogau
- Pistorf
  - Dornach, Maierhof, Sausal
- Ragnitz
  - Badendorf, Edelsee, Gundersdorf, Haslach an der Stiefing, Laubegg, Oberragnitz, Oedt, Rohr
- Ratsch an der Weinstraße
  - Ottenberg
- Retznei
  - Unterlupitscheni
- Sankt Andrä-Höch
  - Brünngraben, Fantsch, Höch, Neudorf im Sausal, Reith, Rettenberg, Sankt Andrä im Sausal, Sausal
- Sankt Georgen an der Stiefing
  - Baldau, Gerbersdorf, Kurzragnitz, Lappach, Prentern, Stiefing, Stiefingberg
- Sankt Johann im Saggautal
  - Eichberg, Gündorf, Narrath, Praratheregg, Radiga, Saggau, Untergreith
- Sankt Nikolai im Sausal
  - Flamberg, Greith, Grötsch, Lamperstätten, Mitteregg, Mollitsch, Oberjahring, Petzles, Unterjahring, Waldschach
- Sankt Nikolai ob Draßling
  - Hütt, Leitersdorf, Marchtring
- Sankt Ulrich am Waasen
  - Wutschdorf
- Sankt Veit am Vogau
  - Labuttendorf, Lind, Lipsch, Neutersdorf, Rabenhof, Wagendorf
- Schloßberg
  - Großwalz, Remschnigg
- Seggauberg
  - Oberlupitscheni, Rettenbach, Schönegg
- Spielfeld
  - Graßnitzberg, Obegg
- Stocking
  - Afram, Alla, Aug, Hart bei Wildon, Neudorf, Sukdull
- Straß in Steiermark
  - Gersdorf an der Mur
- Sulztal an der Weinstraße
  - Sulztal
- Tillmitsch
  - Altenberg bei Leibnitz, Grössing, Maxlon, Neutillmitsch, Steingrub
- Vogau
- Wagna
  - Aflenz an der Sulm, Hasendorf an der Mur, Leitring
- Weitendorf
  - Kainach bei Wildon, Lichendorf, Neudorf ob Wildon
- Wildon
- Wolfsberg im Schwarzautal
  - Marchtring, Wölferberg
