= Sulztal an der Weinstraße =

- Former municipality
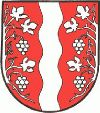
- Coat of arms

- Location within Austria
- Coordinates: 46°41′9″N 15°33′0″E
- Country: Austria
- State: Styria
- District: Leibnitz

Area
  - Total: 2.28 km^{2} (0.88 sq mi)
- Elevation: 505 m (1,657 ft)

Population (1 January 2016)
  - Total: 126
  - Density: 55.3/km^{2} (143/sq mi)
- Time zone: UTC+1 (CET)
  - Summer (DST): UTC+2 (CEST)
- Postal code: 8461
- Area code: 03453
- Vehicle registration: LB
- Website: www.sulztal-weinstrasse. steiermark.at

Sulztal an der Weinstraße is a former municipality in the district of Leibnitz in the Austrian state of Styria. Since the 2015 Styria municipal structural reform, it is part of the municipality Gamlitz.

== Population ==
Historical population
Year	Pop.	±%
1869	280	—
1880	277	−1.1%
1890	275	−0.7%
1900	284	+3.3%
1910	215	−24.3%
1923	254	+18.1%
1934	313	+23.2%
1939	295	−5.8%
1951	349	+18.3%
1961	249	−28.7%
1971	187	−24.9%
1981	158	−15.5%
1991	158	+0.0%
2001	152	−3.8%
2013	126	−17.1%
