= Jakob Suppan =

Composer and musician from the Holy Roman Empire (1734–1810)

- Born: July 27, 1734; Schrötten, Hengsberg, Holy Roman Empire (now Austria)
- Died: April 11, 1810 (aged 75); Kamnik, Austrian Empire (now Slovenia)
- Education: Jesuit University of Graz
- Occupation: Composer

Jakob Suppan (Slovenized: Jakob Frančišek Zupan, July 27, 1734 – April 11, 1810) was a composer and musician from the Holy Roman Empire.

== Early life and education ==
Suppan was born in Schrötten in the Duchy of Styria in the Holy Roman Empire, now part of the municipality of Hengsberg in Styria, in southeast Austria. He was the second of ten children born to the smallholder Hans Suppan and Benigna (née Höller) Suppan, and he was baptized Jacob Suppan. His surname indicates Slovene ancestry on his father's side; Slovenes once relocated to the Hengsberg area in large numbers from the Haloze region and the Slovene Hills. He probably received his music education from the local organist Andreas Dämb (1702–1753), and he then entered the Jesuit University of Graz in 1749 as the recipient of a scholarship founded by the Hengsberg parish priest Rupert Brenner. His enrollment at the university is recorded as Suppan Jacob, plebejus Hinspergensis 'Jacob Suppan, a common man from Hengsberg'.

== Career ==
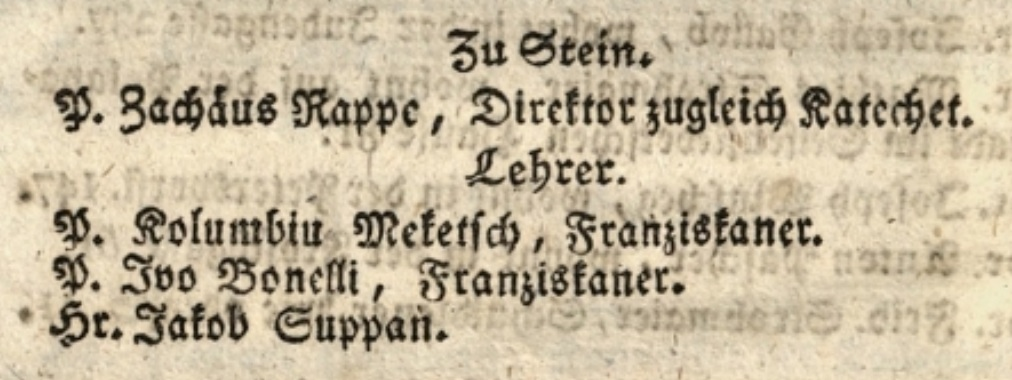
Suppan listed among teachers in Kamnik in 1795

Suppan relocated to Kamnik (now in Slovenia) before 1757, where he was initially an assistant to the teacher and organist Valentin Götzl. He married Götzl's daughter Josepha on August 3, 1757, and in 1760 he became Götzl's successor as the teacher and choirmaster at the women's church in Šutna, Kamnik. From 1762 to 1765 he was the music director and teacher at the boys' seminary in Komenda, which Peter Pavel Glavar founded in 1760. His vocal-instrumental masses there attracted people from near and far to the Komenda church. As a composer, he was apparently already involved in secular music at this time. However, it is not clear whether he was only filling the gap in Komenda that had arisen due to the three-year absence of the Czech teacher Mathias Jellinek (a.k.a. Gellinek), or whether Glavar wanted to have him permanently in his seminary. He returned to Kamnik in 1765.

Suppan founded a private school before 1770, where he taught reading, writing, arithmetic, and music to bourgeois children. In 1787, the authorities banned him from the school and sent him to take a teacher's exam, after which he was appointed a teacher at the main school in Kamnik. Although he had a good reputation as a teacher, his financial situation gradually deteriorated, and his income as an organist decreased when Mekinje, Stranje, Rova, and Vranja Peč separated from the parish of Kamnik. Suppan was therefore granted the job and income of a sexton, but this did not improve his financial situation, and the complaints he sent to Ljubljana and Graz were not resolved favorably. All of this probably took away his will to compose. His problems were compounded by poor health, and by 1801 he had become so weak that his teaching duties had to be performed by substitutes. Suppan died in Kamnik in 1810.

== Works ==
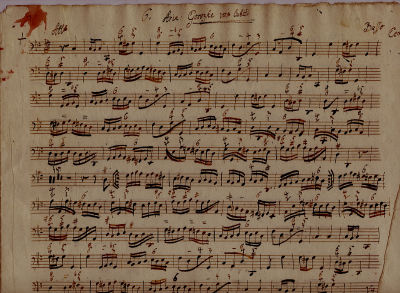
The aria Goreče vas lubiti (To Love You Ardently) from Suppan's opera Bellin

The philologist Marko Pohlin described Suppan as "Ludi et Chori Magister Kamnecensis, egregius Compositor et Musicus" (a schoolmaster and choir director from Kamnik, an excellent composer and musician). He is important as a composer primarily as the creator of the first Slovene opera, Bellin, a work in three acts for five singers. He composed it to a libretto by Feliks Anton Dev, published in 1780 in the poetry almanac Piſanize od lepeh umetnost (Writings of Beautiful Art). The music of the opera was considered lost until 2008, when its manuscript was discovered by Milko Bizjak. His name is given as Jacobo Francisco Suppan in the manuscript of the work.

Altogether, over 20 of Suppan's compositions have been preserved, some only partially. Because the musical archives in Slovenia have not been fully explored, it is possible that additional works by Suppan will be discovered.
