= Saint Ulrich =

Saint Ulrich (German: Sankt Ulrich, Sankt-Ulrich) or Saint Ulric may refer to four saints:

- Ulrich of Augsburg (890–973), Bishop of Augsburg and a leader of the German church, saint
- Ulrich of Zell (c. 1029–1093), Cluniac reformer of Germany, abbot, founder and saint
- Wulfric of Holme, also known as Ulric of Holme, 10th-century saint from England
- Wulfric of Haselbury (c. 1080–1154), also known as Ulric of Haselbury, saint from England

== Churches named after St. Ulrich ==
- St. Ulrich's and St. Afra's Abbey (Augsburg)
- Basilica of SS. Ulrich and Afra, Augsburg
- St. Ulrich's Priory in the Black Forest
- St. Ulrich, Vienna

== Places named after St. Ulrich ==
- Sankt Ulrich in Gröden, the German name for Urtijëi in South Tyrol, Italy
- Sankt Ulrich im Mühlkreis, a municipality in Upper Austria, Austria
- Sankt Ulrich am Pillersee, a municipality in Tyrol, Austria
- Sankt Ulrich bei Steyr, a municipality in Upper Austria, Austria
- Sankt Ulrich am Waasen, a municipality in Styria, Austria
