= Sankt Andrä-Höch =

- Municipality
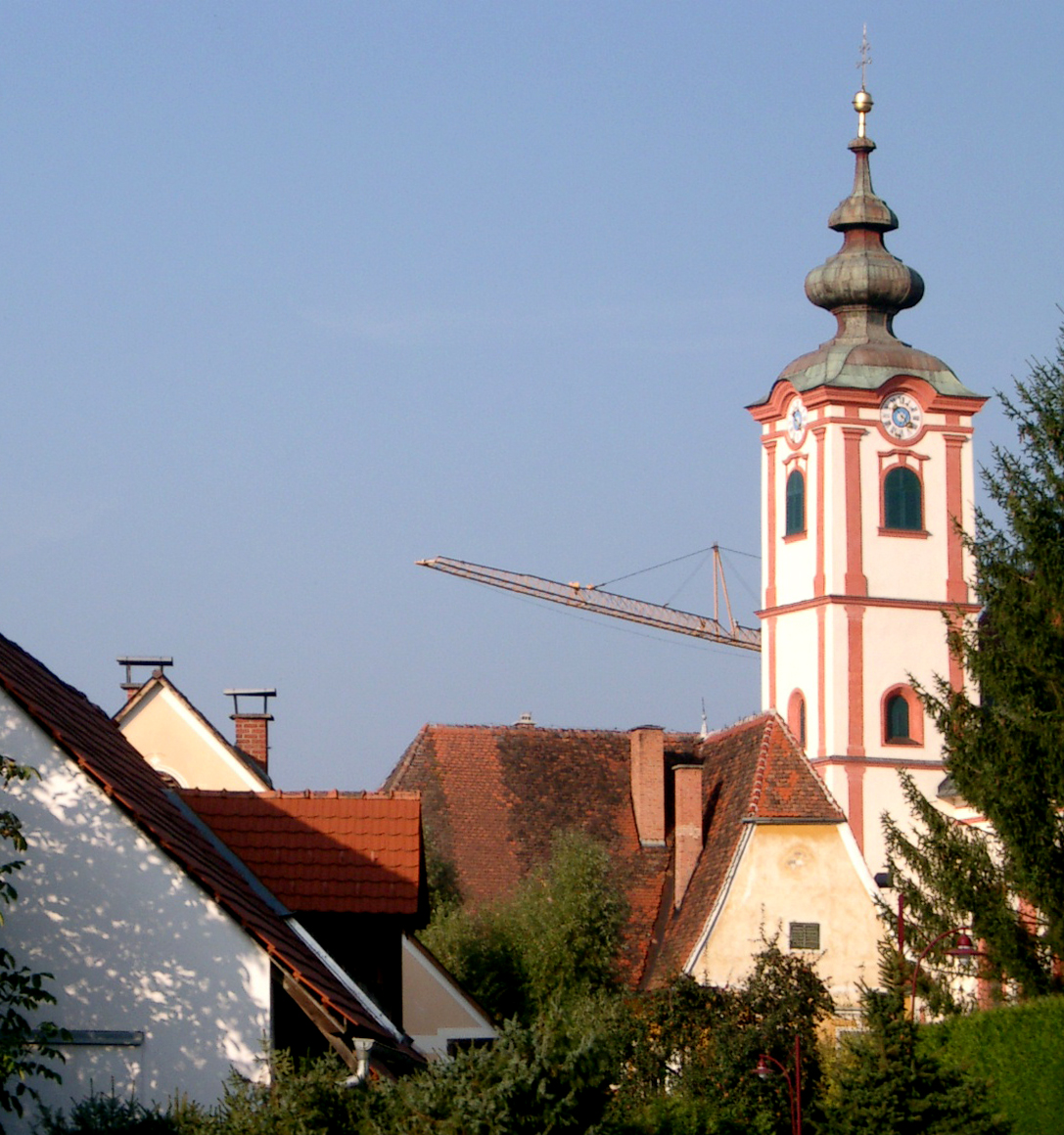
- Sankt Andrä-Höch parish church

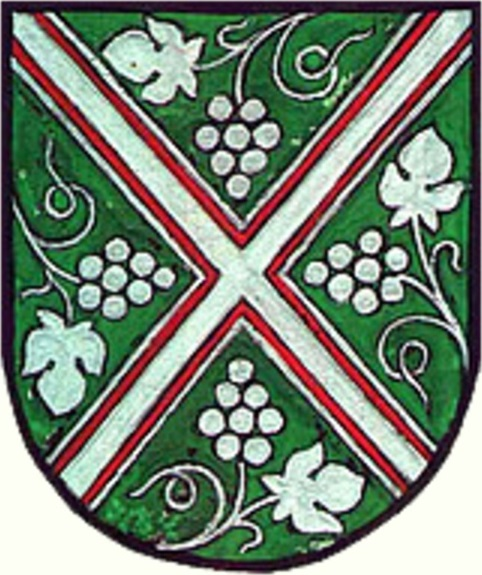
- Coat of arms

- Location within Austria
- Coordinates: 46°47′33″N 15°22′46″E
- Country: Austria
- State: Styria
- District: Leibnitz

Government
  - Mayor: Gerald Aldrian (ÖVP)

Area
  - Total: 20.62 km^{2} (7.96 sq mi)
- Elevation: 318–671 m (1,043–2,201 ft)

Population (2018-01-01)
  - Total: 1,731
  - Density: 83.95/km^{2} (217.4/sq mi)
- Time zone: UTC+1 (CET)
  - Summer (DST): UTC+2 (CEST)
- Postal code: 8444, 8441, 8442, 8443, 8505, 8521, 8522
- Area code: 03456, 03457, 03185
- Vehicle registration: LB
- Website: www.st-andrae-hoech.at

Sankt Andrä-Höch is a municipality in the district of Leibnitz in the Austrian state of Styria.

== Geography ==
Sankt Andrä-Höch lies about 35 km south of Graz and about 15 km west of Leibnitz.
