= Allerheiligen bei Wildon =

- Municipality
- Coat of arms

- Location within Austria
- Coordinates: 46°54′51″N 15°33′14″E
- Country: Austria
- State: Styria
- District: Leibnitz

Government
  - Mayor: Christian Sekli (ÖVP)

Area
  - Total: 20.34 km^{2} (7.85 sq mi)
- Elevation: 407 m (1,335 ft)

Population (2018-01-01)
  - Total: 1,470
  - Density: 72.3/km^{2} (187/sq mi)
- Time zone: UTC+1 (CET)
  - Summer (DST): UTC+2 (CEST)
- Postal code: 8412
- Area code: 03182
- Vehicle registration: LB
- Website: www.allerheiligen-wildon.at

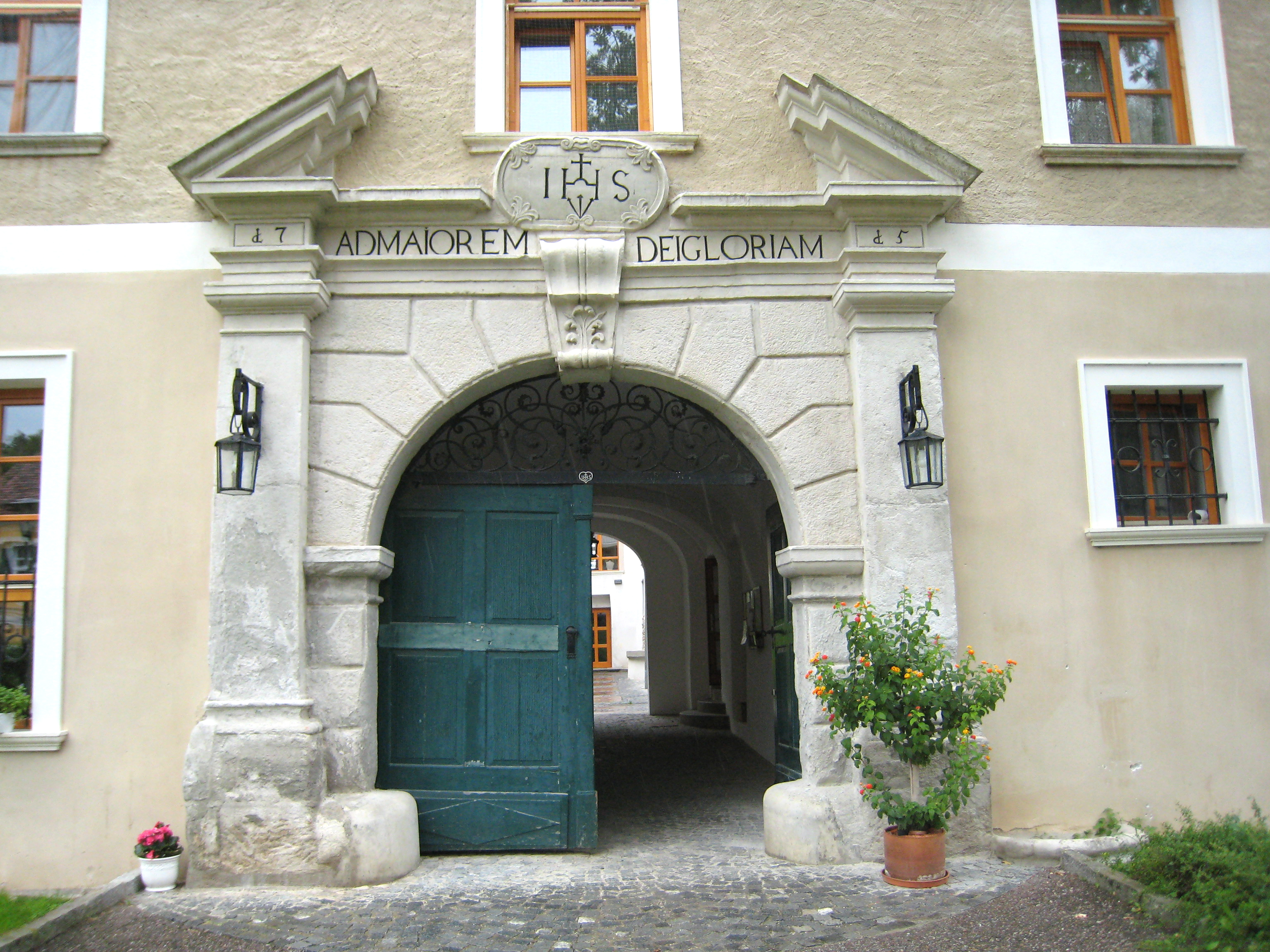
Portal of Herbersdorf castle with Jesuit inscription

Allerheiligen bei Wildon (German: [ˌalɐˈhaɪ̯lign̩ baɪ̯ vildoːn]) is a municipality in the district of Leibnitz in Styria, Austria. The name "Allerheiligen" translates to "All Saints" and derives from the local church. The addition "bei Wildon" means "near Wildon", thus differentiating the municipality from others of the same name.

== History ==
Archeological findings on the nearby Buchkogel and Kögelberg mountains indicate that the area was already settled in the stone age. Findings within the borders of the modern municipality indicate significant settlement activity around the first century AD. They include the remains of a villa rustica and an extensive field of Celtic-Roman burial mounds. After the end of the Roman Empire, Slavic peasants settled in the area.

With Bavarian colonization and the systematic settlement politics of the great Bavarian monasteries, the history of the area began to be documented in written sources. The first mentions of several hamlets within the modern municipality date to this time.

The village of Allerheiligen itself emerged around the Herbersdorf Castle and the nearby church, which was established by Markwart of Herbersdorf in 1218. The Herbersdorf family owned the castle until 1609, when possession was transferred to the Glojach family. Because of substantial tax debt, the Glojachs were soon forced to sell the castle to the Jesuits.

While the city of Graz was ravaged by the plague in 1680, instruction by the scholastics at Graz University, which was then led by Jesuits, was temporarily relocated to Allerheiligen. With Jesuit support, the village church was rebuilt in unusual size and splendor. When the Jesuit Order was dissolved in 1773, possession of the castle was transferred to the state religious fund. Through the ensuing abolition of feudal structures, important functions previously held by the lords of the castle were transferred to the newly created municipality. The history of the municipality thus separated from the history of the castle, which had dominated the village for centuries. In 1968, the formerly independent municipality of Feiting was incorporated into Allerheiligen.

Today, Allerheiligen is a flourishing village or small town in the exurbs of Graz which continues to attract new inhabitants while retaining its traditional rural charm.

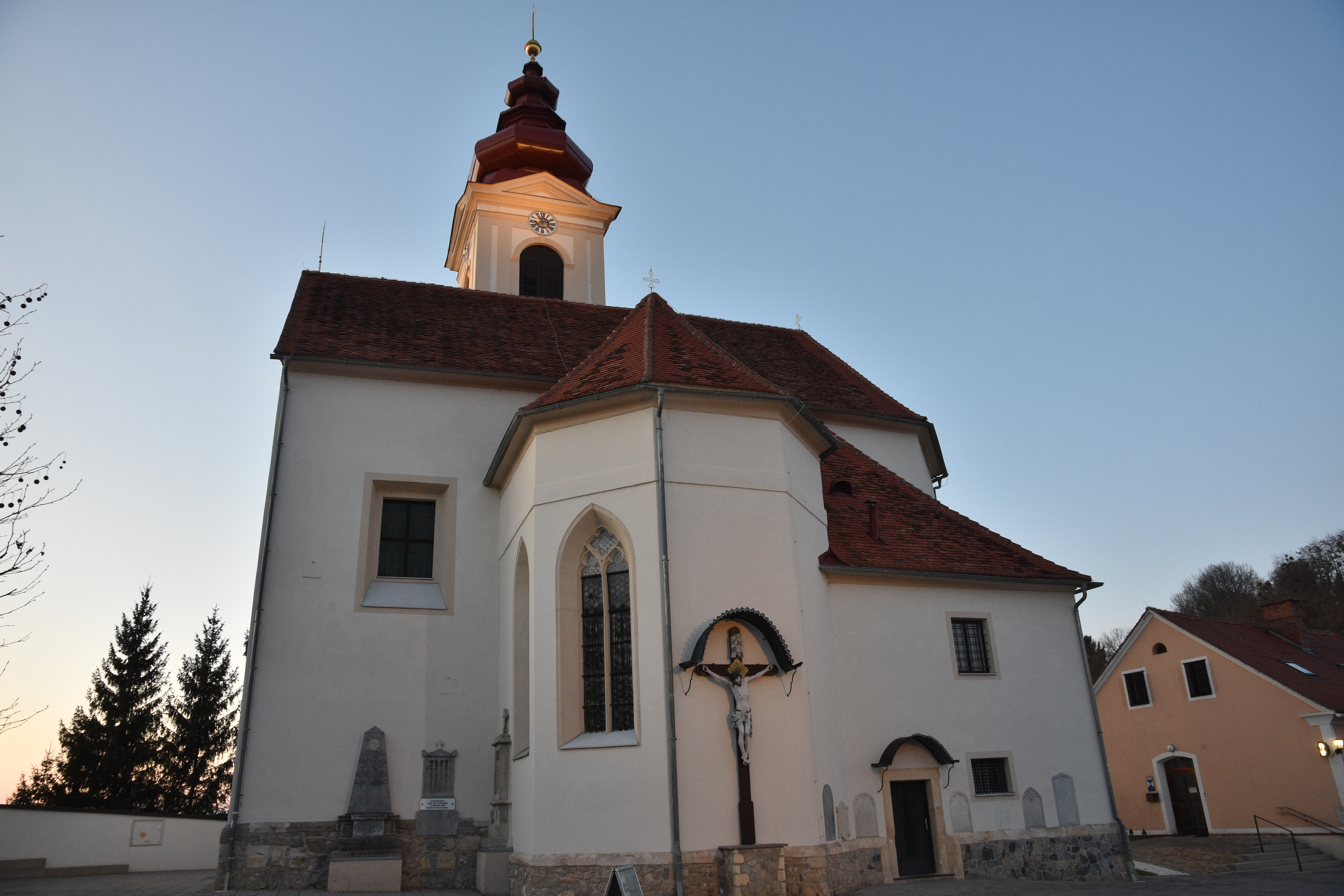
Parish church of Allerheiligen
