= Ragnitz =

- Municipality
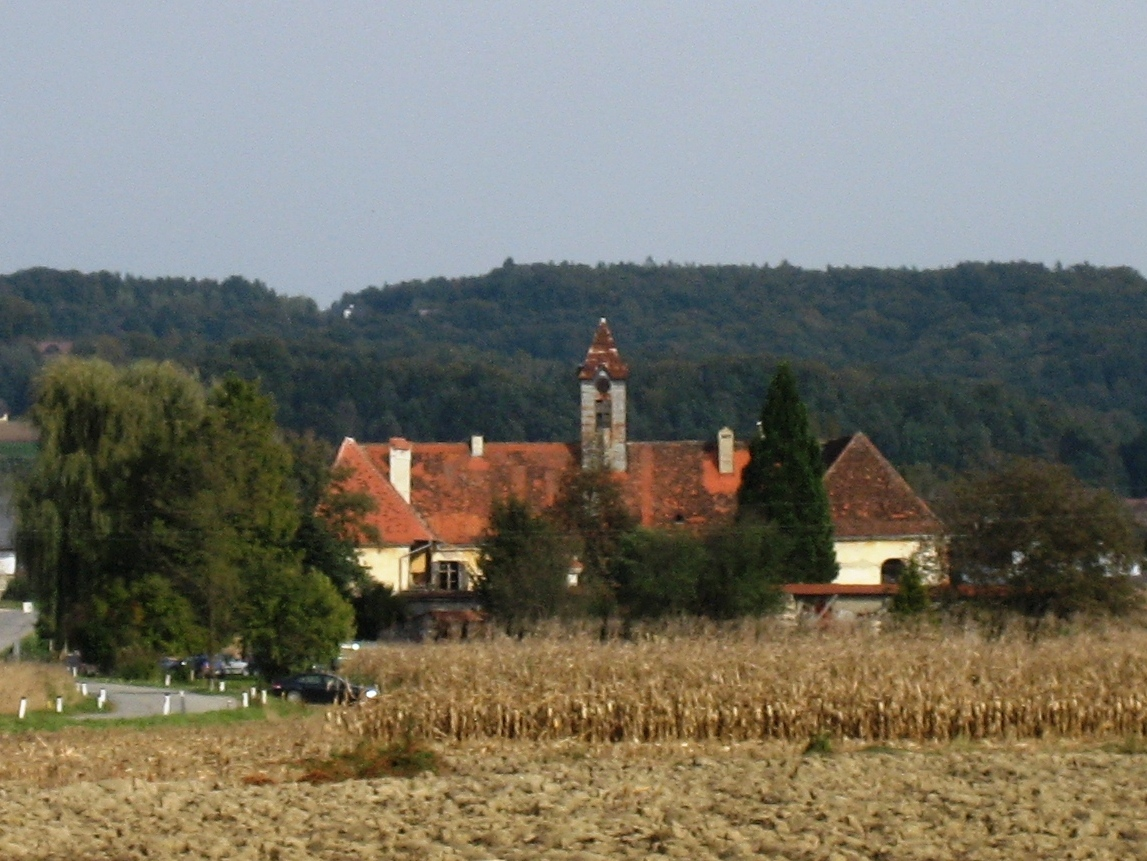

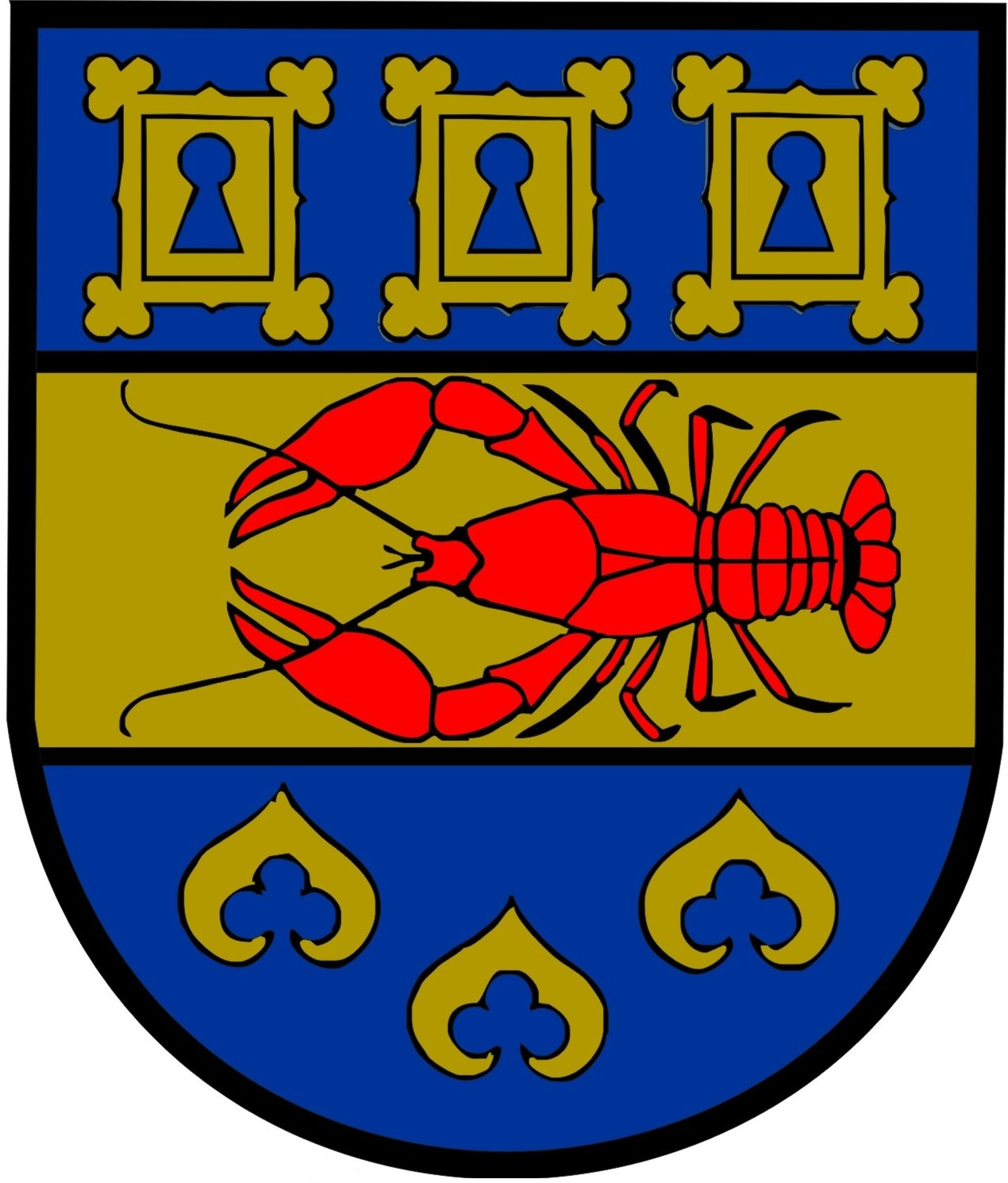
- Coat of arms

- Location within Austria
- Coordinates: 46°51′00″N 15°34′12″E
- Country: Austria
- State: Styria
- District: Leibnitz

Government
  - Mayor: Rudolf Rauch (ÖVP)

Area
  - Total: 20.77 km^{2} (8.02 sq mi)
- Elevation: 281 m (922 ft)

Population (2018-01-01)
  - Total: 1,469
  - Density: 70.73/km^{2} (183.2/sq mi)
- Time zone: UTC+1 (CET)
  - Summer (DST): UTC+2 (CEST)
- Postal code: 8413
- Area code: 03183
- Vehicle registration: LB
- Website: https://ragnitz.gv.at/

Ragnitz (German: [ˈraːgnit͡s]) is a municipality in the district of Leibnitz in Styria, Austria. Three castles are within the territories of Ragnitz : Schloss Frauheim, Schloss Laubegg and Schloss Rohr
