= Großklein =

- Municipality
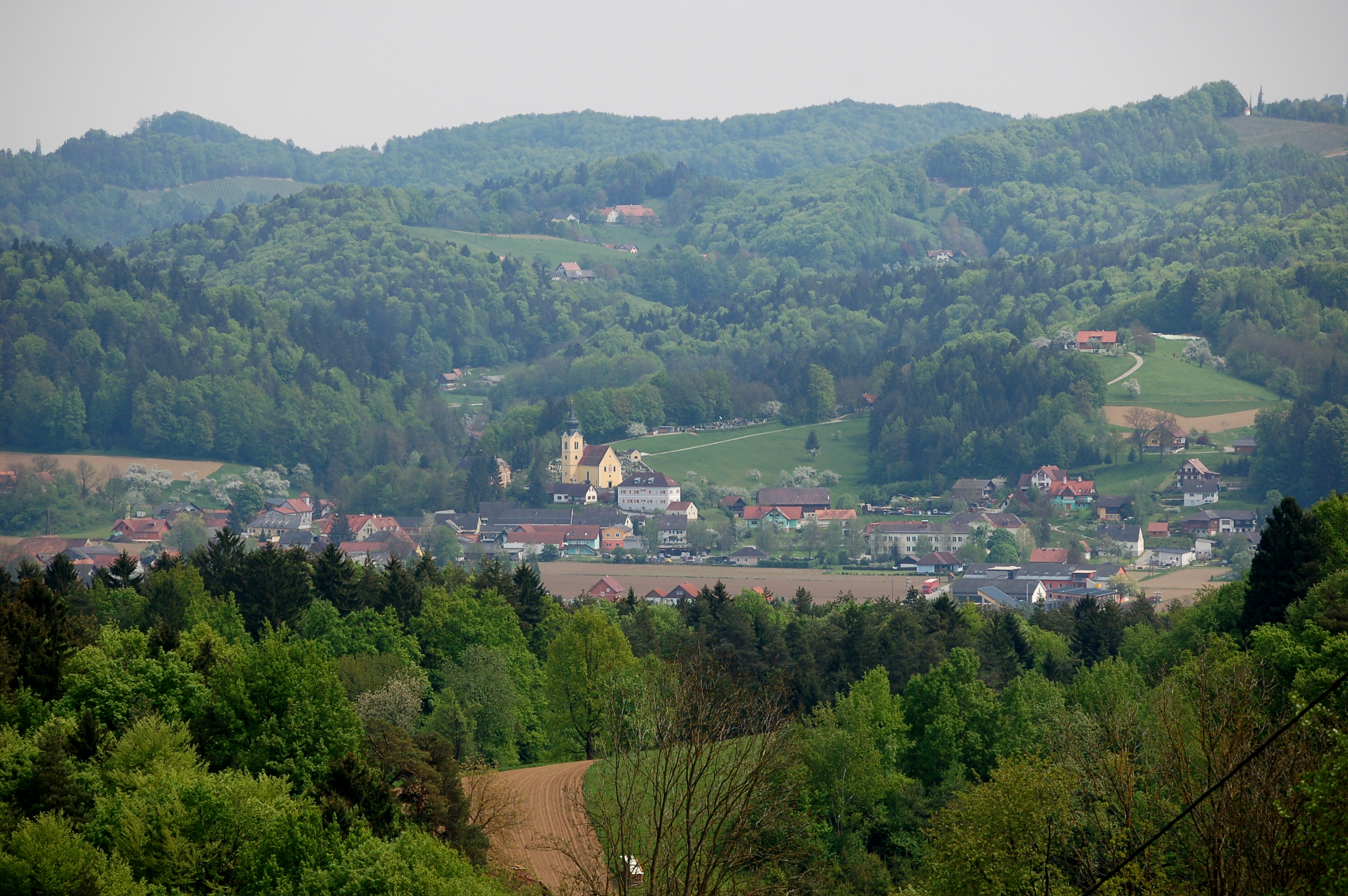
- View of Großklein

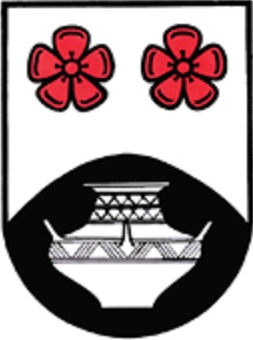
- Coat of arms

- Location within Austria
- Coordinates: 46°44′00″N 15°26′00″E
- Country: Austria
- State: Styria
- District: Leibnitz

Government
  - Mayor: Robert Dirnböck

Area
  - Total: 27.71 km^{2} (10.70 sq mi)
- Elevation: 364 m (1,194 ft)

Population (2018-01-01)
  - Total: 2,292
  - Density: 82.71/km^{2} (214.2/sq mi)
- Time zone: UTC+1 (CET)
  - Summer (DST): UTC+2 (CEST)
- Postal code: 8452
- Area code: 03456
- Vehicle registration: LB
- Website: www.grossklein.gv.at

Großklein is a municipality in the district of Leibnitz in Styria, Austria. It lies on the South Styrian Weinstraße, a wine route.

== Etymology ==
Its place name can be considered unusual as groß is German for 'big' or 'tall' while klein translates to 'small', thus, it can be translated as 'big-small'. However, this does not reflect the real origins of the name. The -klein portion, according to German linguist Fritz Lochner von Hüttenbach, likely stems from Slavic roots in form of the word glina ('clay, loam') or kljun ('beak'). Modern Großklein as well as its surrounding areas were once part of a larger area called Klein. The name was changed in 1968 following a decision by the municipal council.
