= Sankt Ulrich am Waasen =

- Former municipality
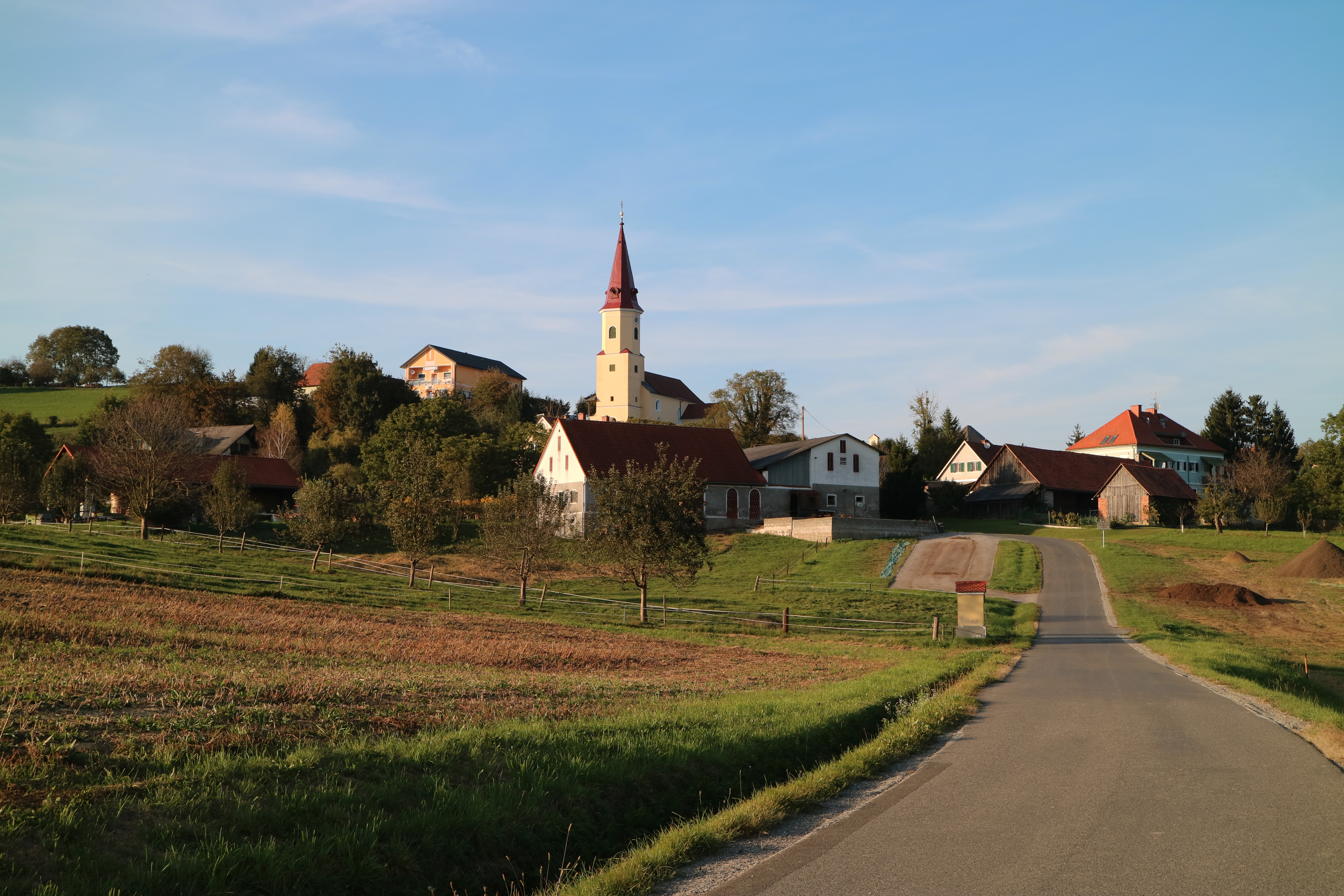
- View from south

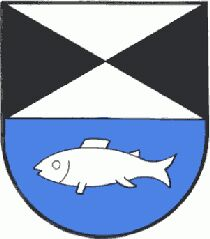
- Coat of arms

- Location within Austria
- Coordinates: 46°55′48″N 15°31′48″E
- Country: Austria
- State: Styria
- District: Leibnitz

Area
  - Total: 10.0 km^{2} (3.9 sq mi)
- Elevation: 394 m (1,293 ft)

Population (1 January 2016)
  - Total: 780
  - Density: 78/km^{2} (200/sq mi)
- Time zone: UTC+1 (CET)
  - Summer (DST): UTC+2 (CEST)
- Postal code: 8072, 8081, 8412
- Area code: 03135
- Vehicle registration: LB
- Website: www.st-ulrich-waasen.steiermark.at

Sankt Ulrich am Waasen is a former municipality in the district of Leibnitz in Styria, Austria. Since the 2015 Styria municipal structural reform, has been part of the municipality Heiligenkreuz am Waasen.
