= Seggauberg =

- Former municipality
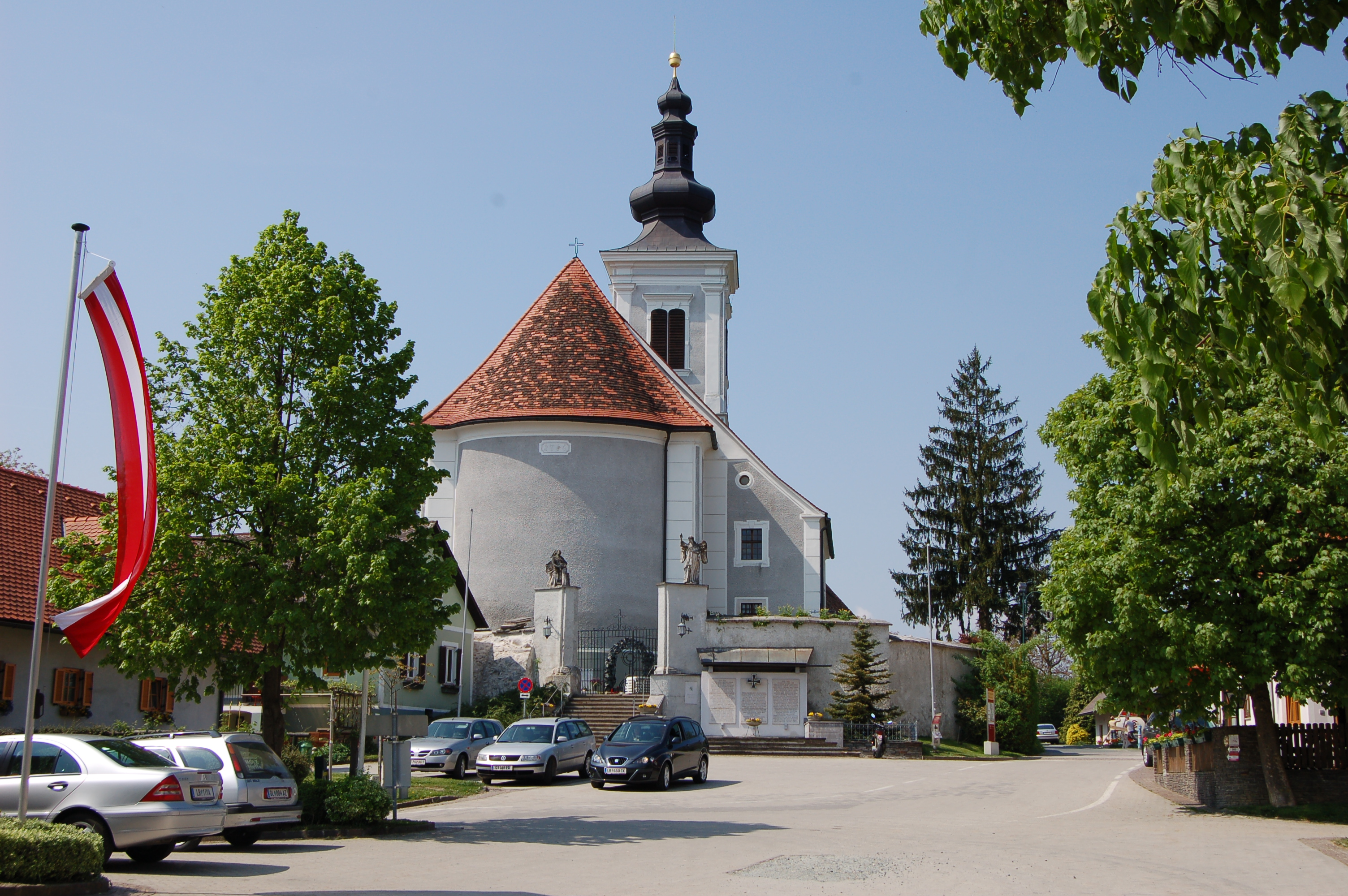
- Main square with church

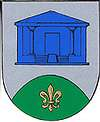
- Coat of arms

- Location within Austria
- Coordinates: 46°46′16″N 15°31′14″E
- Country: Austria
- State: Styria
- District: Leibnitz

Area
  - Total: 11.02 km^{2} (4.25 sq mi)
- Elevation: 360 m (1,180 ft)

Population (1 January 2016)
  - Total: 951
  - Density: 86.3/km^{2} (224/sq mi)
- Time zone: UTC+1 (CET)
  - Summer (DST): UTC+2 (CEST)
- Postal code: 8430, 8451
- Area code: 03452
- Vehicle registration: LB
- Website: www.seggauberg. steiermark.at

Seggauberg is a former municipality in the district of Leibnitz in the Austrian state of Styria. Since the 2015 Styria municipal structural reform, it is part of the municipality Leibnitz.

== Geography ==
Seggauberg lies about 35 km south of Graz between the Sulm valley and the Mur valley.
