= Lebring-Sankt Margarethen =

- Municipality
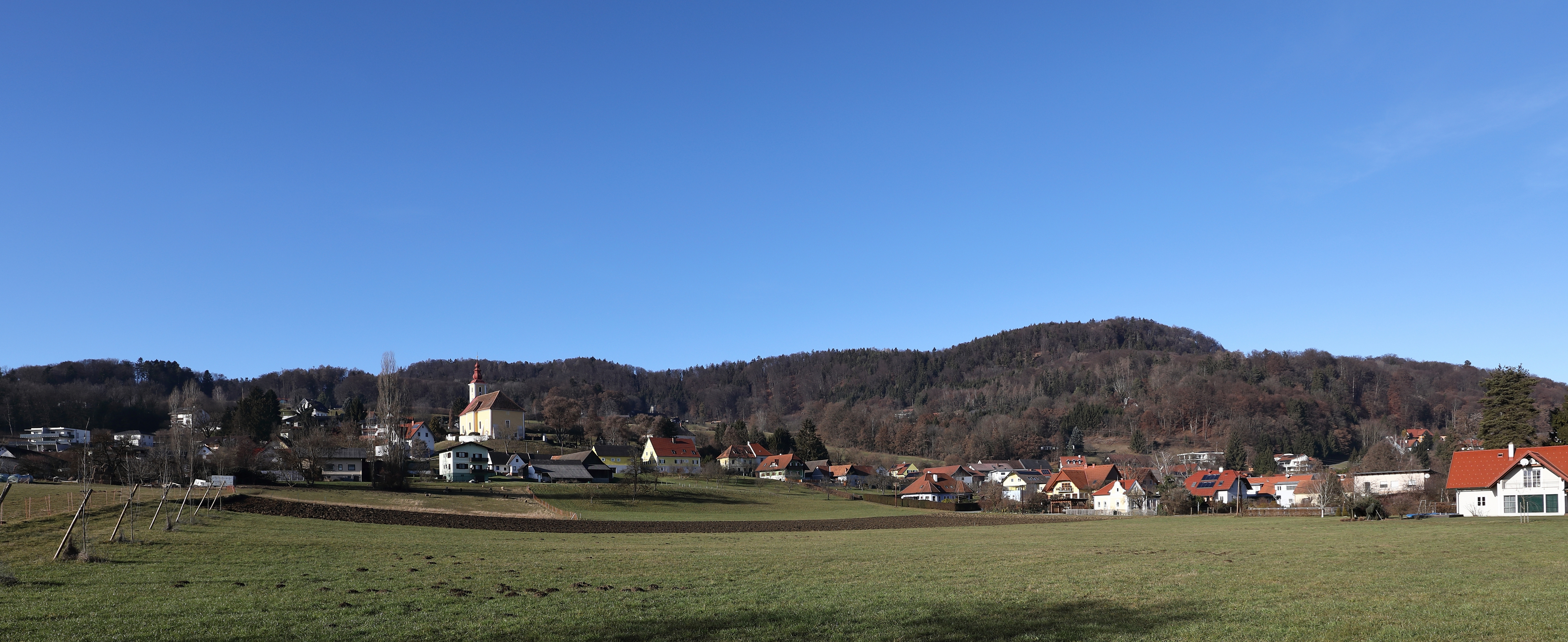

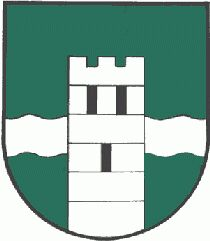
- Coat of arms

- Location within Austria
- Coordinates: 46°51′49″N 15°31′40″E
- Country: Austria
- State: Styria
- District: Leibnitz

Government
  - Mayor: Franz Labugger (ÖVP)

Area
  - Total: 7.6 km^{2} (2.9 sq mi)
- Elevation: 286 m (938 ft)

Population (2018-01-01)
  - Total: 2,168
  - Density: 290/km^{2} (740/sq mi)
- Time zone: UTC+1 (CET)
  - Summer (DST): UTC+2 (CEST)
- Postal code: 8403
- Area code: 03182
- Vehicle registration: LB
- Website: https://www.lebring-st-margarethen.gv.at/

Lebring-Sankt Margarethen is a municipality in the district of Leibnitz in the Austrian state of Styria.

== Geography ==
Lebring lies on the right bank of the Mur river about 4 km south of Wildon and 8 km north of Leibnitz.
