= Empersdorf =

- Municipality
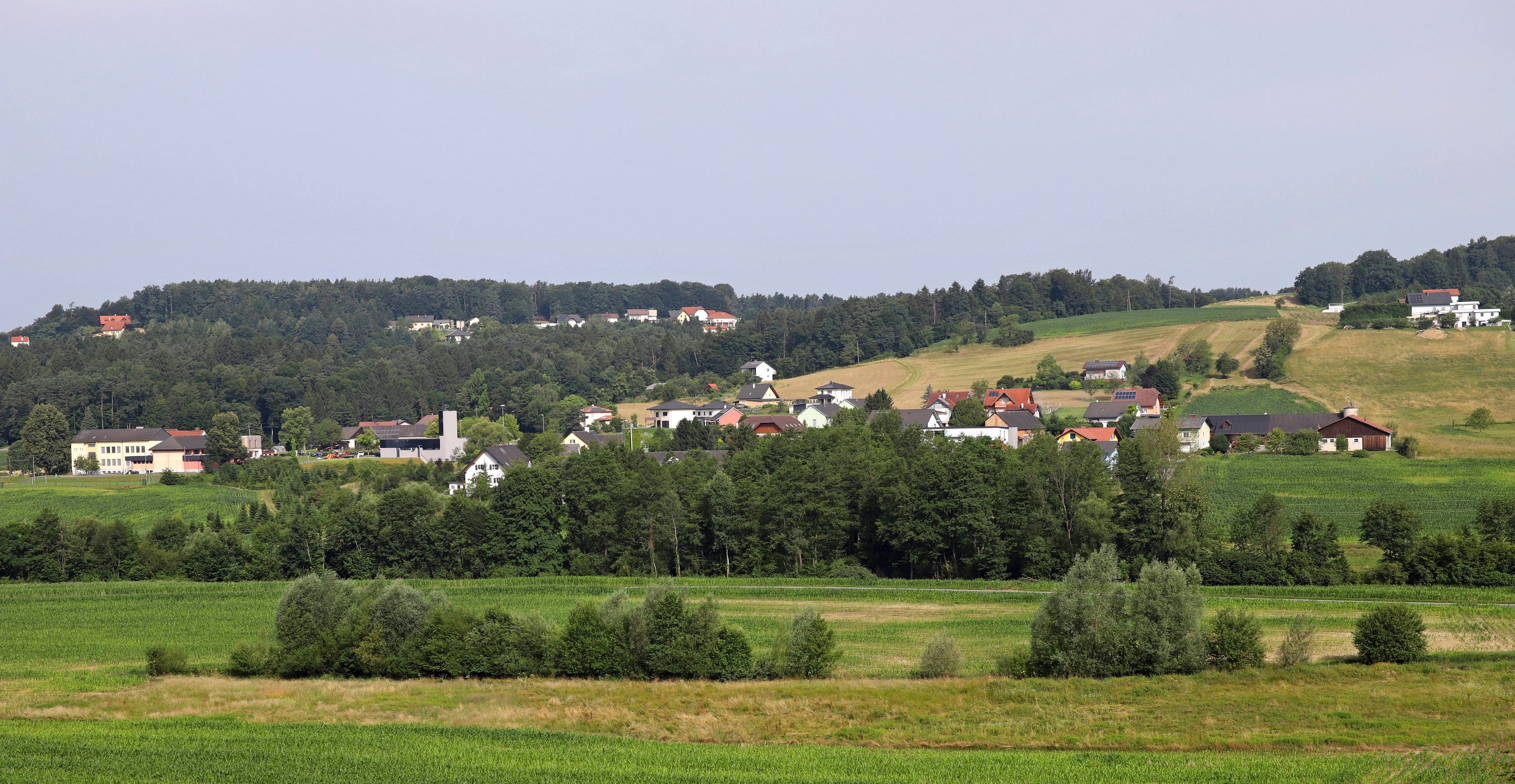
- Empersdorf

- Coat of arms

- Location within Austria
- Coordinates: 46°58′48″N 15°36′00″E
- Country: Austria
- State: Styria
- District: Leibnitz

Government
  - Mayor: Alois Baumhackl (ÖVP)

Area
  - Total: 14.19 km^{2} (5.48 sq mi)
- Elevation: 360 m (1,180 ft)

Population (2018-01-01)
  - Total: 1,376
  - Density: 96.97/km^{2} (251.2/sq mi)
- Time zone: UTC+1 (CET)
  - Summer (DST): UTC+2 (CEST)
- Postal code: 8081, 8302
- Area code: 03134
- Vehicle registration: LB
- Website: www.empersdorf.com

Empersdorf is a municipality in the district of Leibnitz in the Austrian state of Styria.

== Geography ==
Empersdorf is the northernmost municipality in the district of Leibnitz.
