= Petzles =

Coordinates: 46°48′10″N 15°27′37″E

Petzles is a hamlet in the village of Sankt Nikolai im Sausal in the district of Leibnitz in Styria, Austria. The hamlet has a population of 146 (2011). It is situated within the Sausal mountain range. The area has a mediterranean-type microclimate and has extensive vineyards producing Südsteiermark region wines. Figs and kiwifruit also grow there. There are visitors from Graz and further afield in the warmer months coming to sample wine and cold meats in the traditional Buschenschenke vineyard tavernas.
