= Heimschuh =

- Municipality
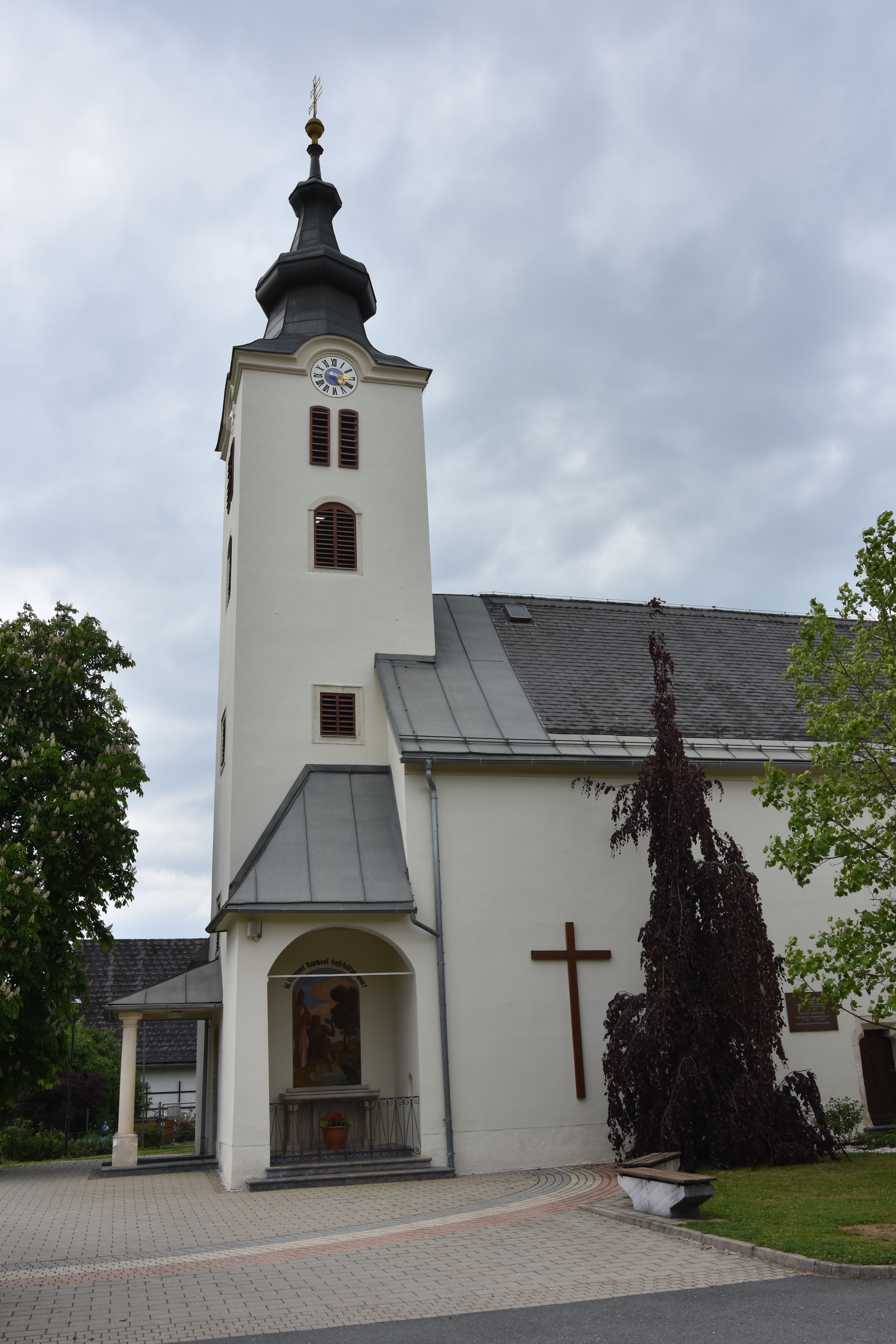
- Heimschuh parish church

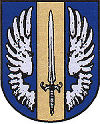
- Coat of arms

- Location within Austria
- Coordinates: 46°43′48″N 15°28′48″E
- Country: Austria
- State: Styria
- District: Leibnitz

Government
  - Mayor: Siegfried Innerhofer (ÖVP)

Area
  - Total: 18.51 km^{2} (7.15 sq mi)
- Elevation: 280 m (920 ft)

Population (2018-01-01)
  - Total: 1,968
  - Density: 106.3/km^{2} (275.4/sq mi)
- Time zone: UTC+1 (CET)
  - Summer (DST): UTC+2 (CEST)
- Postal code: 8451, 8452
- Area code: 03452
- Vehicle registration: LB
- Website: www.heimschuh.at

Heimschuh (German: [ˈhaɪ̯mˌʃuː]) is a municipality in the district of Leibnitz in the Austrian state of Styria.

== Geography ==
=== Subdivisions ===
On 1 January 1968, the former municipality of Nestelberg was merged with Heimschuh.
Katastralgemeinden are Heimschuh, Kittenberg, Muggenau, Nestelberg bei Heimschuh, and Unterfahrenbach.
