= Gabersdorf =

- Municipality
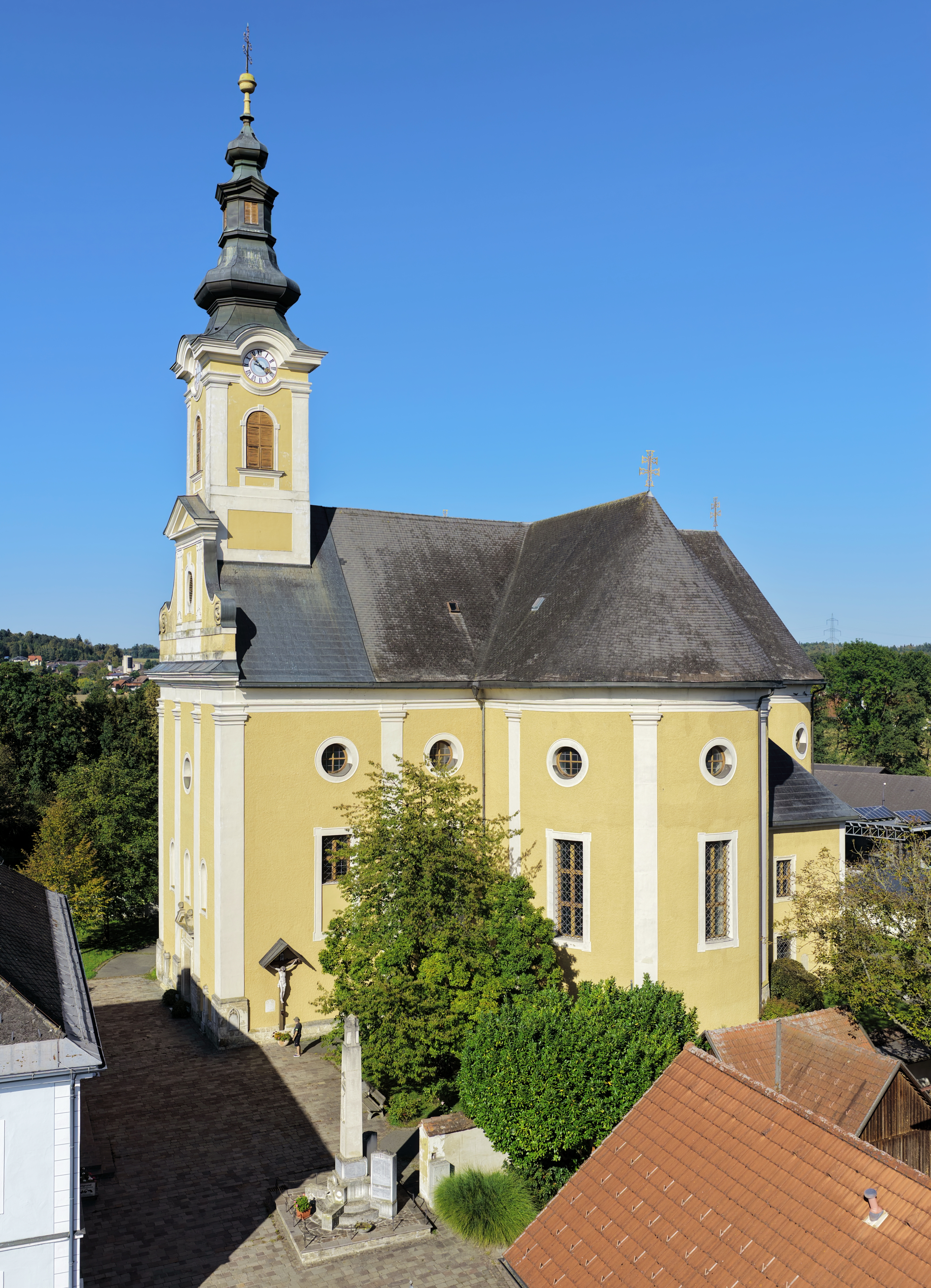
- Gabersdorf parish church

- Coat of arms

- Location within Austria
- Coordinates: 46°46′56.5638″N 15°35′13.7898″E
- Country: Austria
- State: Styria
- District: Leibnitz

Government
  - Mayor: Franz Hierzer (ÖVP)

Area
  - Total: 19.81 km^{2} (7.65 sq mi)
- Elevation: 274 m (899 ft)

Population (2018-01-01)
  - Total: 1,227
  - Density: 61.94/km^{2} (160.4/sq mi)
- Time zone: UTC+1 (CET)
  - Summer (DST): UTC+2 (CEST)
- Postal code: 8424
- Area code: 03452
- Vehicle registration: LB
- Website: www.gabersdorf.at

Gabersdorf (German: [ˈɡaːbɐsˌdɔɐ̯f, ˈɡaːbeʁsˌdɔʁf]) is a municipality in the district of Leibnitz in the Austrian state of Styria.

== Geography ==
Gabersdorf lies east of Leibnitz between the east Styrian hills and the Mur river.
