= Tillmitsch =

- Municipality
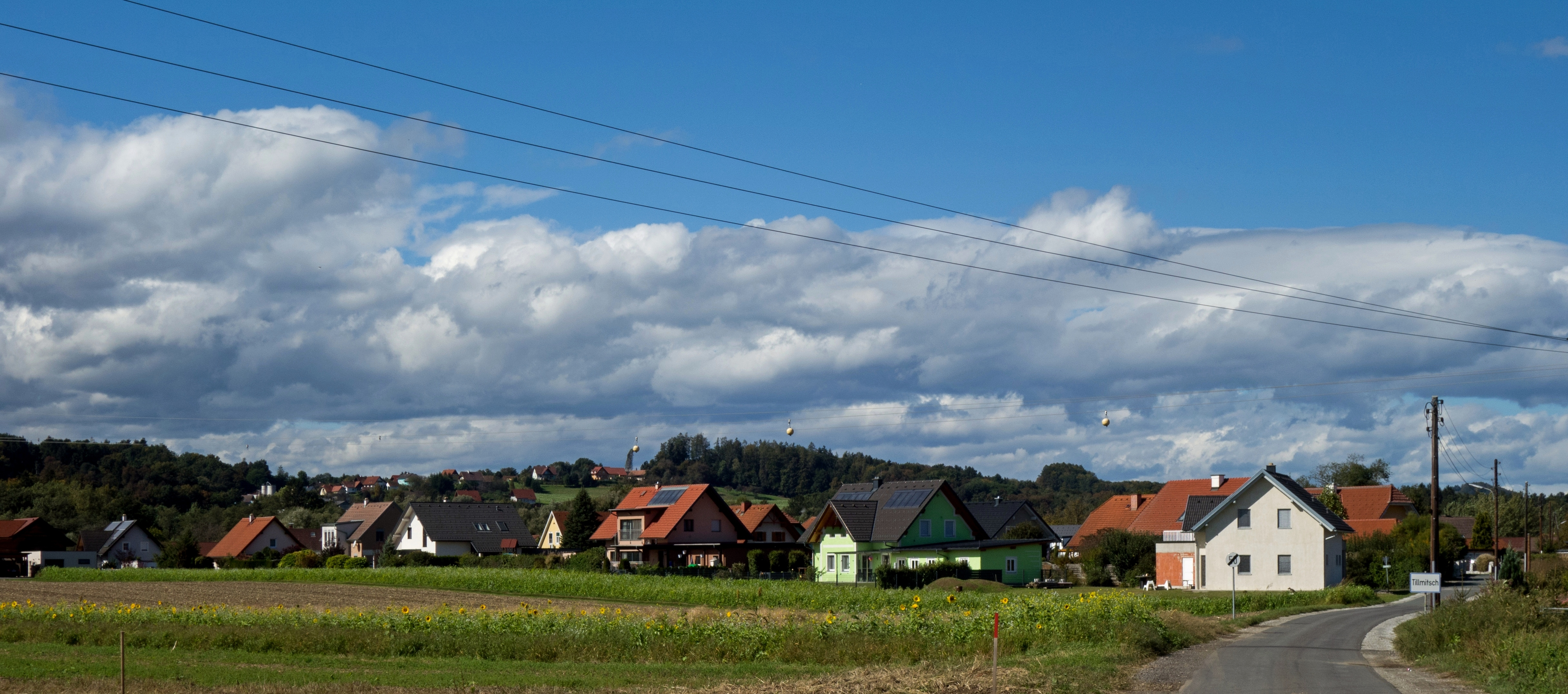
- View of Tillmitsch

- Coat of arms

- Location within Austria
- Coordinates: 46°48′00″N 15°28′48″E
- Country: Austria
- State: Styria
- District: Leibnitz

Government
  - Mayor: Alfred Langbauer (SPÖ)

Area
  - Total: 14.99 km^{2} (5.79 sq mi)
- Elevation: 276 m (906 ft)

Population (2018-01-01)
  - Total: 3,284
  - Density: 219.1/km^{2} (567.4/sq mi)
- Time zone: UTC+1 (CET)
  - Summer (DST): UTC+2 (CEST)
- Postal code: 8430, 8451
- Area code: 03452
- Vehicle registration: LB
- Website: www.tillmitsch.at

Tillmitsch is a municipality in the district of Leibnitz in Styria, Austria.
