= Sankt Johann im Saggautal =

- Municipality
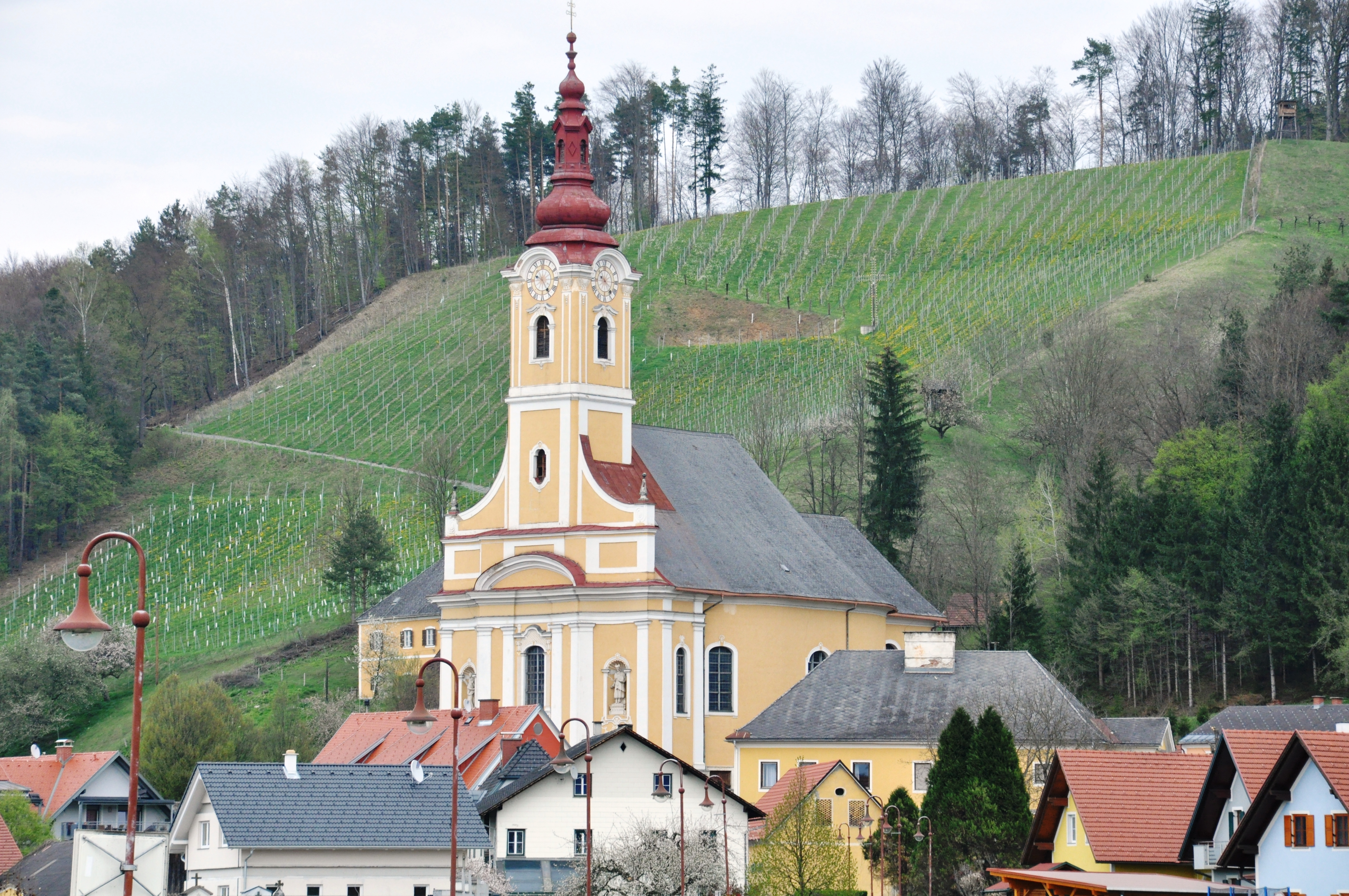
- Sankt Johann im Saggautal parish church

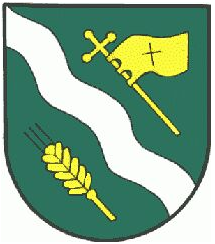
- Coat of arms

- Location within Austria
- Coordinates: 46°42′9.237″N 15°24′2.8506″E
- Country: Austria
- State: Styria
- District: Leibnitz

Government
  - Mayor: Johann Schmid (ÖVP)

Area
  - Total: 27.02 km^{2} (10.43 sq mi)
- Elevation: 316 m (1,037 ft)

Population (2018-01-01)
  - Total: 2,023
  - Density: 74.87/km^{2} (193.9/sq mi)
- Time zone: UTC+1 (CET)
  - Summer (DST): UTC+2 (CEST)
- Postal code: 8452, 8453, 8454
- Area code: 03455
- Vehicle registration: LB
- Website: http://www.st-johann-saggautal.gv.at/

Sankt Johann im Saggautal is a municipality in the district of Leibnitz in the Austrian state of Styria.

== Geography ==
Sankt Johann im Saggautal lies on the Eichberg in southern Styria.
