= Litultovice =

- Market town
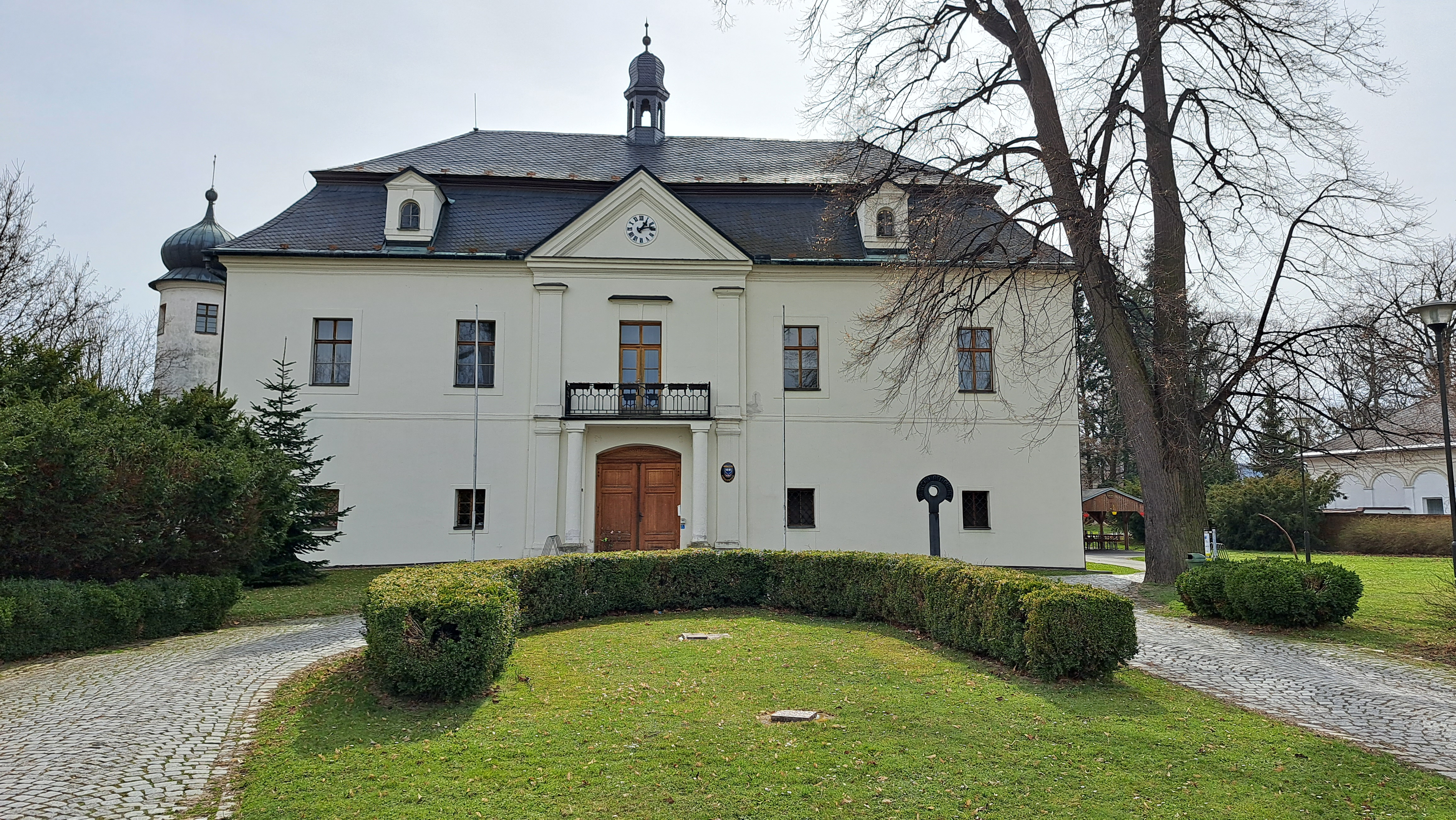
- Litultovice Castle

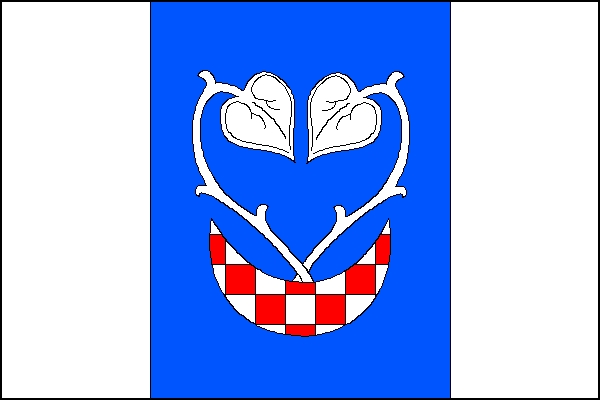
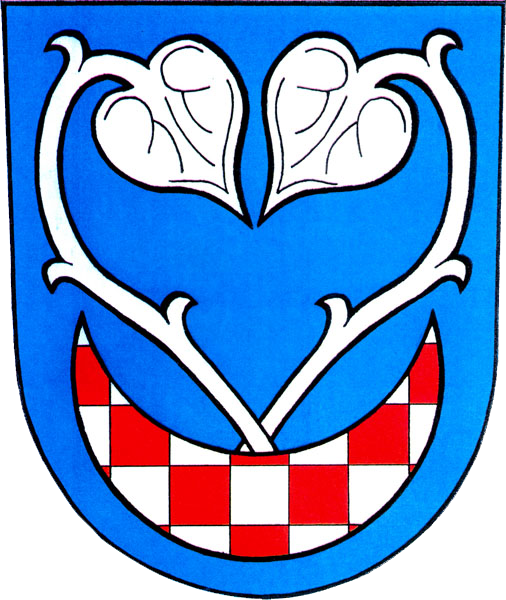
- Flag Coat of arms

- Location in the Czech Republic
- Coordinates: 49°54′14″N 17°45′5″E
- Country: Czech Republic
- Region: Moravian-Silesian
- District: Opava
- First mentioned: 1289

Area
  - Total: 10.35 km^{2} (4.00 sq mi)
- Elevation: 314 m (1,030 ft)

Population (2026-01-01)
  - Total: 929
  - Density: 89.8/km^{2} (232/sq mi)
- Time zone: UTC+1 (CET)
  - Summer (DST): UTC+2 (CEST)
- Postal code: 747 55
- Website: www.litultovice.cz

Litultovice (Czech pronunciation: [ˈlɪtultovɪtsɛ]; German: Leitersdorf) is a market town in Opava District in the Moravian-Silesian Region of the Czech Republic. It has about 900 inhabitants.

== Etymology ==
The name is derived from the personal name Litult, Lutult or Litolt. It was the founder of the village.

== Geography ==
Litultovice is located about 10 kilometres (6 mi) southwest of Opava and 35 km (22 mi) west of Ostrava. It lies in the Nízký Jeseník range. The highest point is at 455 m (1,493 ft) above sea level. The Hvozdnice River flows through the southern part of the municipal territory.

== History ==
The first written mention of Litultovice is from 1289. It was a part of the Moravian enclaves in Silesia owned by the bishops of Olomouc, who gave it to various nobles as a fief. A small fortress in the village was first mentioned in 1446.

The most significant holders of the village were the Běrka of Násilé family (1451–1516), the Stoš of Kounice family (1516–1567) and the Bítovský of Bítov family (1580–1614). In 1582, Litultovice was destroyed by a fire and only the fortress survived. The fortress was replaced by a new castle in 1609. In 1792, Litultovice was bought from the Olomouc bishops by the Putz of Rolsberg family.

In 1887, Litultovice was promoted to a market town. The hamlet of Choltice (today an integral part of Litultovice) was founded in 1846 and annexed to Litultovice in 1949.

== Demographics ==
Historical population

Year	Pop.	±%
1869	798	—
1880	794	−0.5%
1890	790	−0.5%
1900	696	−11.9%
1910	730	+4.9%

Year	Pop.	±%
1921	751	+2.9%
1930	789	+5.1%
1950	698	−11.5%
1961	756	+8.3%
1970	613	−18.9%

Year	Pop.	±%
1980	704	+14.8%
1991	742	+5.4%
2001	761	+2.6%
2011	821	+7.9%
2021	936	+14.0%

Source: Censuses

== Transport ==
The I/46 road from Olomouc to Opava runs through the municipality.

Litultovice is located on the railway line Opava–Svobodné Heřmanice, but trains run on it only on weekends and holidays during the summer season.

== Sights ==
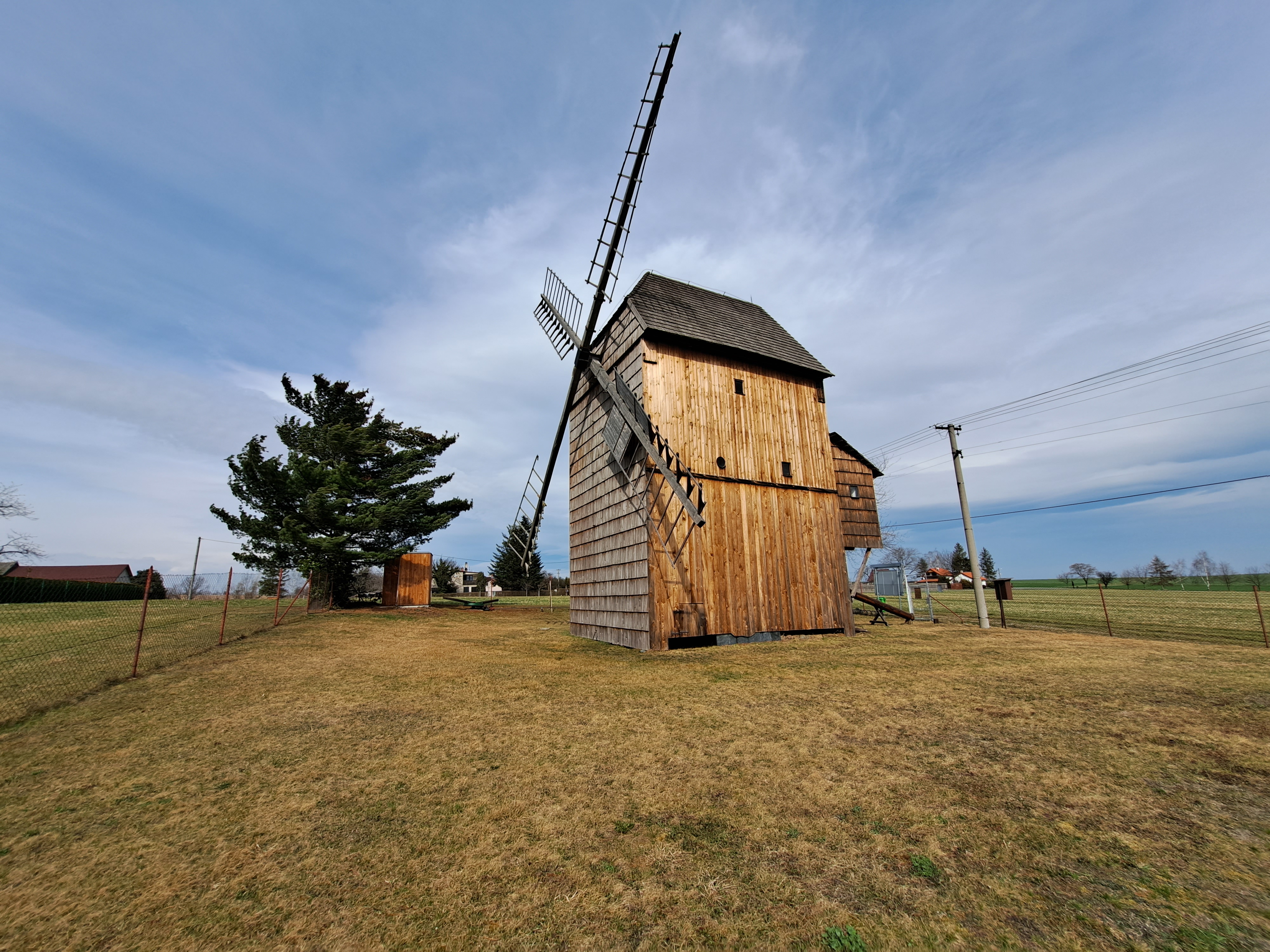
Choltice windmill

The most important monument is the Litultovice Castle. It is formed by two buildings called Starý zámek (Old Castle) and Nový zámek (New Castle). The Old Castle was built in the Renaissance style before 1579, on the site of an old fortress. It has preserved the original interior painting from the years 1580–1600. The New Castle is a Baroque building from the 18th century. Today the castle houses the municipal office and a library. Next to the castle is a park.

A cultural monument is the wooden Choltice windmill from 1833. It was originally built in nearby Sádek. In 1878, it was transferred to its present location. The mill operated until 1953 and its complete technical equipment has been preserved.

Among the main landmarks of Litultovice is the Church of Saint Bartholomew. It was built in 1844–1847.
