= Gamlitz =

- Municipality
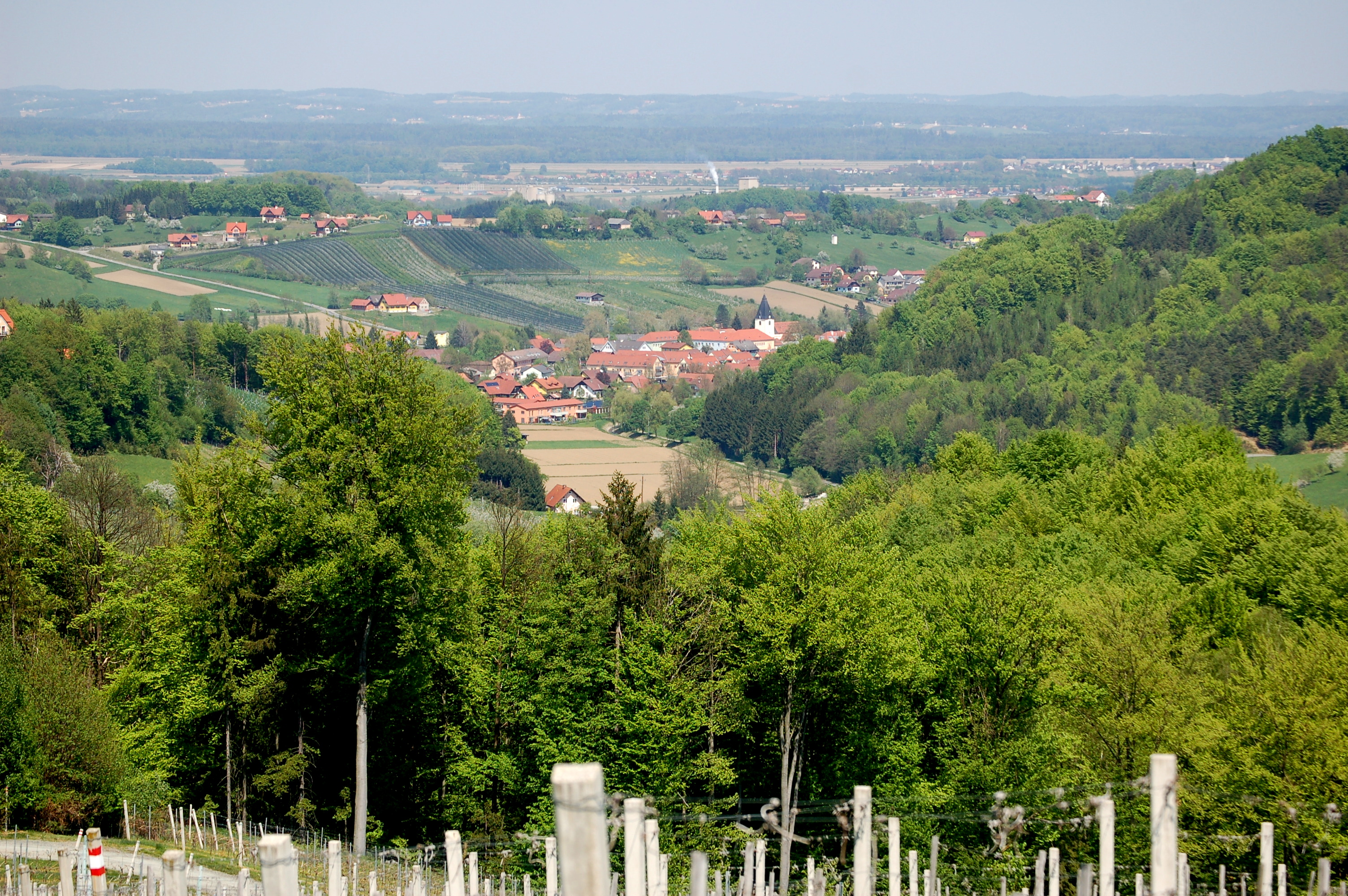

- Coat of arms

- Location within Austria
- Coordinates: 46°43′13″N 15°33′12″E
- Country: Austria
- State: Styria
- District: Leibnitz

Government
  - Mayor: Karl Wratschko (ÖVP)

Area
  - Total: 36.81 km^{2} (14.21 sq mi)
- Elevation: 278 m (912 ft)

Population (2018-01-01)
  - Total: 3,248
  - Density: 88.24/km^{2} (228.5/sq mi)
- Time zone: UTC+1 (CET)
  - Summer (DST): UTC+2 (CEST)
- Postal code: 8461, 8462
- Area code: 03453
- Vehicle registration: LB
- Website: www.gamlitz.at

Gamlitz (German: [ˈɡamlit͡s], Slovene: Gomilica) is a municipality in the district of Leibnitz in Styria, Austria. In the first known document that mentions it (dated from 1145), the settlement is called Gomilnitz, a reference either to the Slavic gomilca which denotes a small hill, or to gom (a group or chain of hills); indeed Gamlitz is situated among and between rolling hills. The tradition of the local castle goes back to the year 1111.
