= Heiligenkreuz am Waasen =

- Municipality
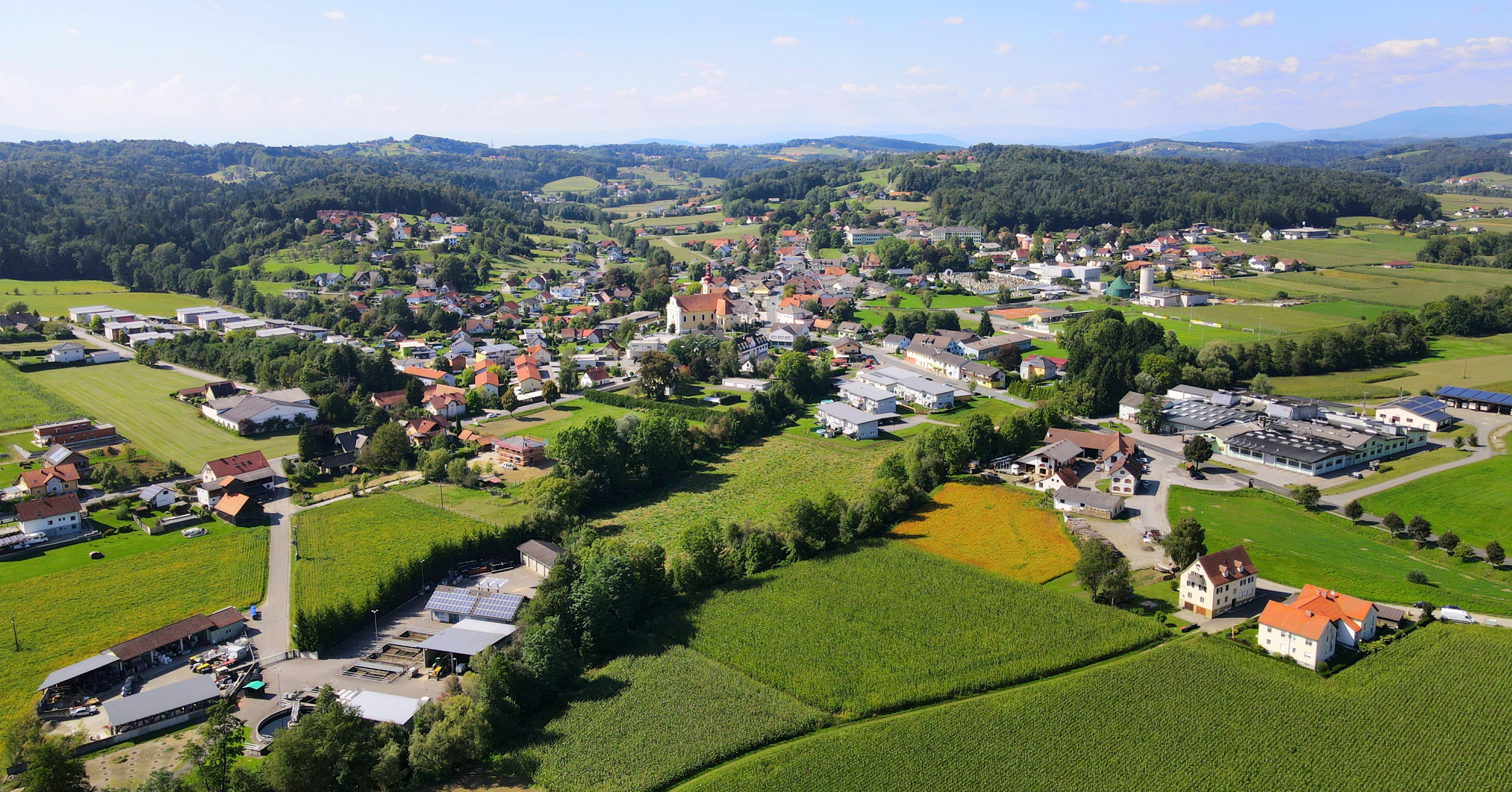

- Coat of arms

- Location within Austria
- Coordinates: 46°57′23″N 15°35′06″E
- Country: Austria
- State: Styria
- District: Leibnitz

Government
  - Mayor: Franz Platzer (ÖVP)

Area
  - Total: 26.32 km^{2} (10.16 sq mi)
- Elevation: 329 m (1,079 ft)

Population (2018-01-01)
  - Total: 2,787
  - Density: 105.9/km^{2} (274.3/sq mi)
- Time zone: UTC+1 (CET)
  - Summer (DST): UTC+2 (CEST)
- Postal code: 8081
- Area code: 03134
- Vehicle registration: LB
- Website: www.heiligenkreuz-waasen.steiermark.at

Heiligenkreuz am Waasen (German: [ˌhaɪ̯lign̩ˈkʁɔʏ̯t͡s am vaːzn̩]) is a municipality in the district of Leibnitz in Styria, Austria.
