= Sankt Nikolai im Sausal =

- Municipality
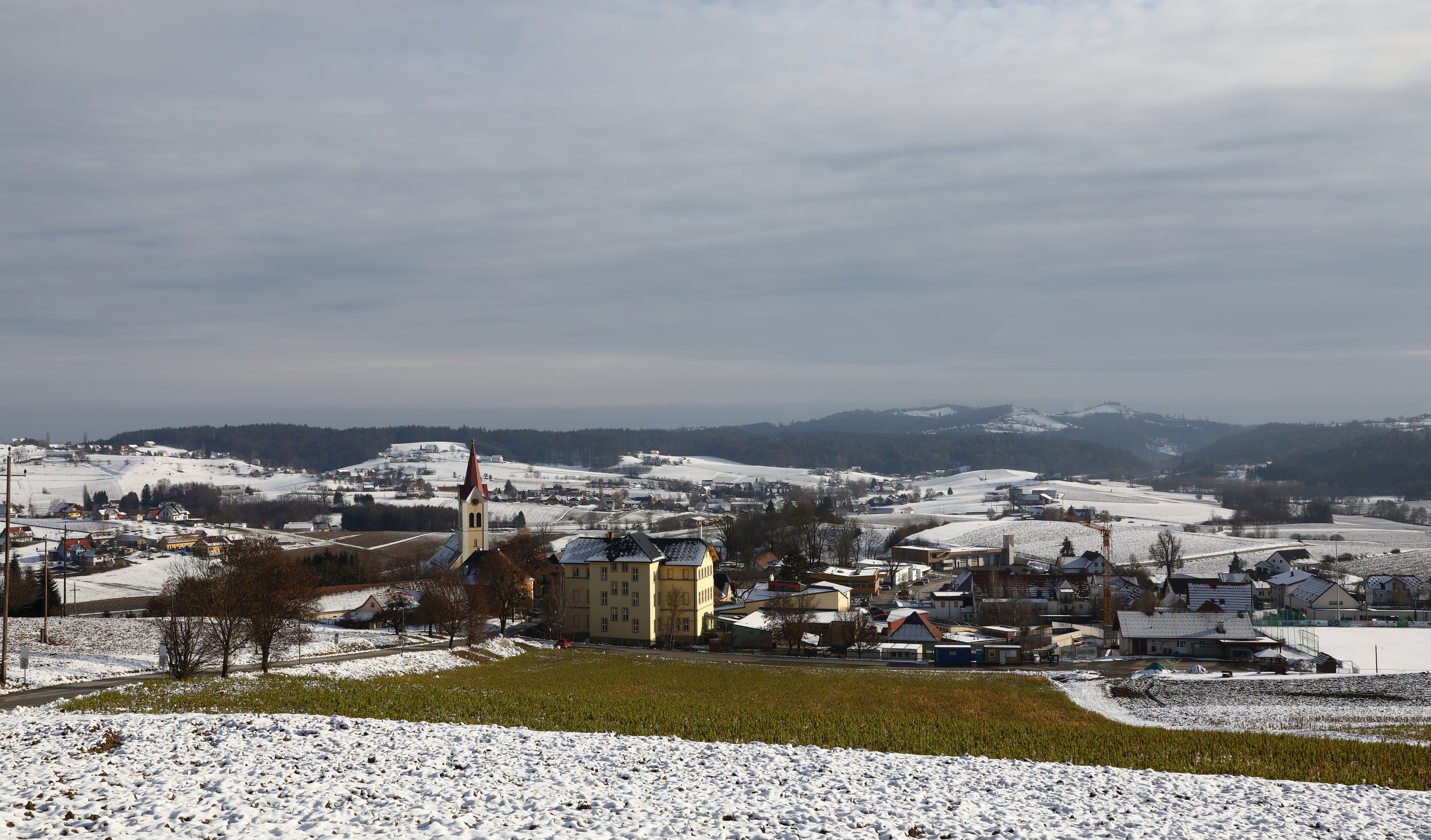

- Coat of arms

- Location within Austria
- Coordinates: 46°49′12″N 15°28′48″E
- Country: Austria
- State: Styria
- District: Leibnitz

Government
  - Mayor: Kurt Kada (SPÖ)

Area
  - Total: 26.18 km^{2} (10.11 sq mi)
- Elevation: 342 m (1,122 ft)

Population (2018-01-01)
  - Total: 2,257
  - Density: 86.21/km^{2} (223.3/sq mi)
- Time zone: UTC+1 (CET)
  - Summer (DST): UTC+2 (CEST)
- Postal code: 8505
- Area code: 03185
- Vehicle registration: LB
- Website: https://www.nikolai-sausal.at/

Sankt Nikolai im Sausal is a municipality in the district of Leibnitz in Styria, Austria.
