= Sankt Georgen an der Stiefing =

Sankt Georgen an der Stiefing Sankt Georgen on da Stiefing
- Municipality
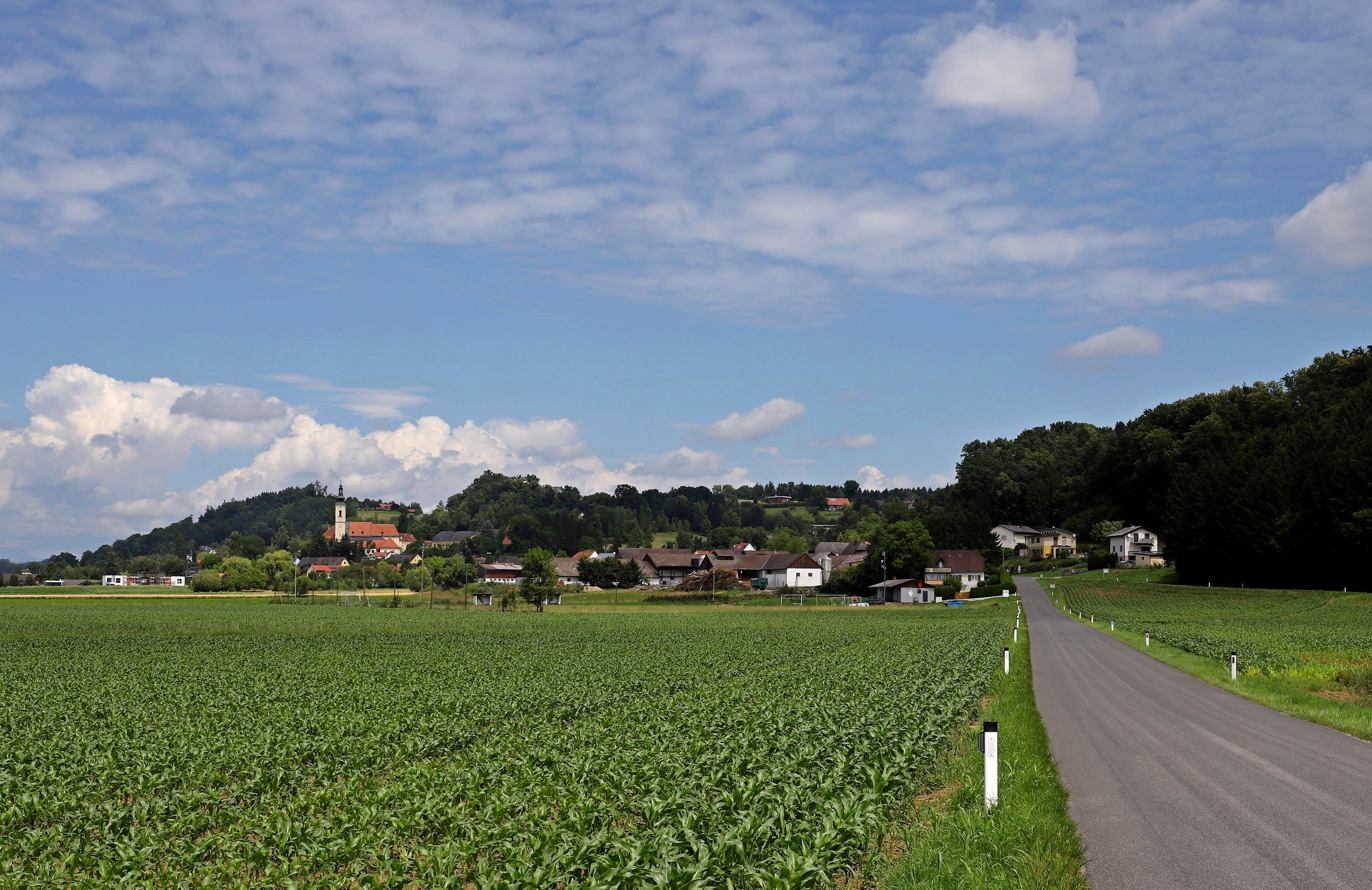
- Sankt Georgen

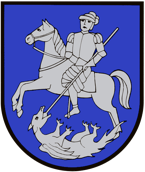
- Coat of arms

- Location within Austria
- Coordinates: 46°52′12″N 15°34′48″E
- Country: Austria
- State: Styria
- District: Leibnitz

Government
  - Mayor: Wolfgang Neubauer (ÖVP)

Area
  - Total: 18.72 km^{2} (7.23 sq mi)
- Elevation: 319 m (1,047 ft)

Population (2018-01-01)
  - Total: 1,475
  - Density: 78.79/km^{2} (204.1/sq mi)
- Time zone: UTC+1 (CET)
  - Summer (DST): UTC+2 (CEST)
- Postal code: 8413
- Area code: 03183
- Vehicle registration: LB
- Website: www.st-georgen-stiefing.steiermark.at

Sankt Georgen an der Stiefing (Central Bavarian: Sankt Georgen on da Stiefing) is a municipality in the district of Leibnitz in Styria, Austria.
