= Gralla (municipality) =

- Municipality
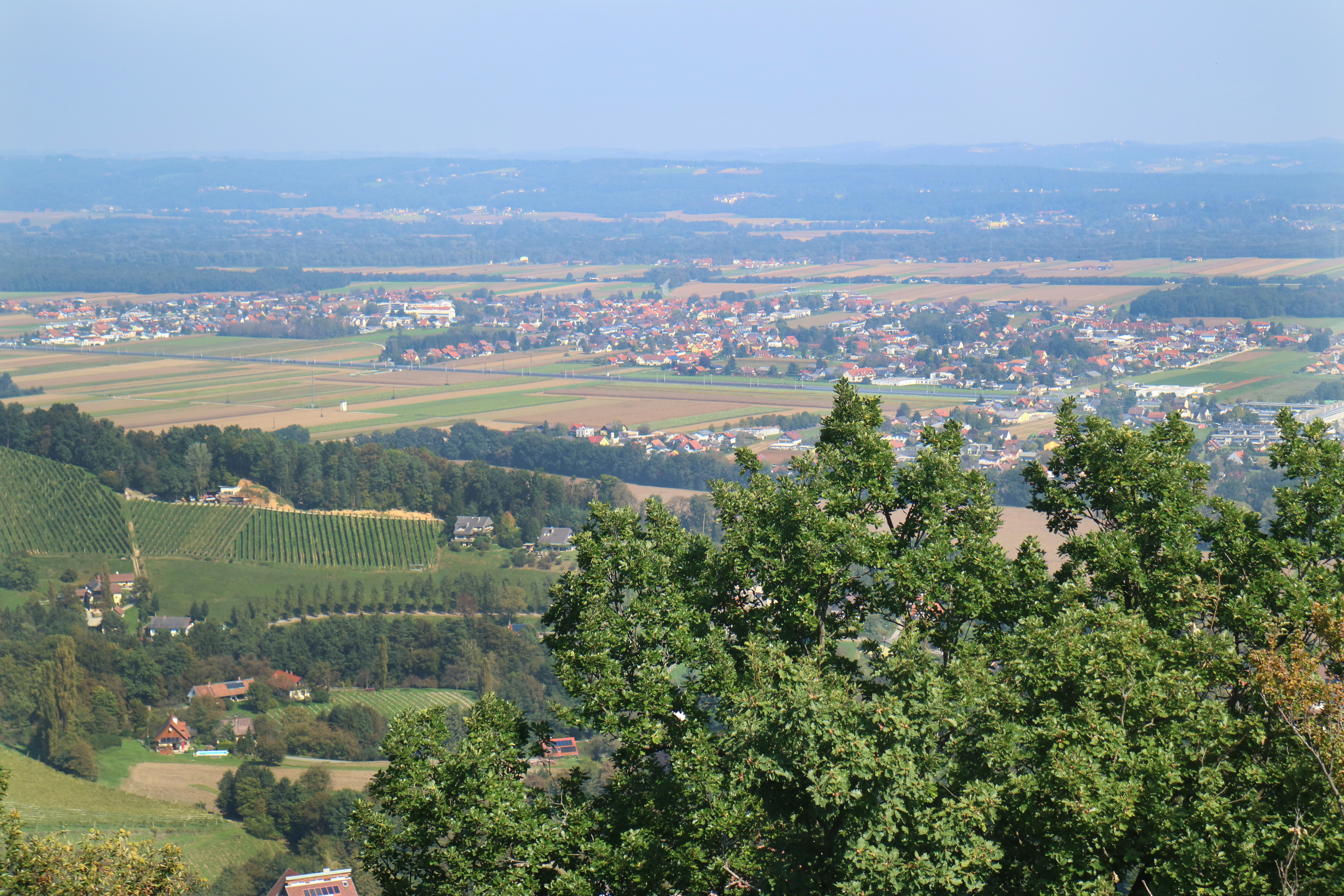
- View of Gralla

- Coat of arms

- Location within Austria
- Coordinates: 46°50′0″N 15°32′0″E
- Country: Austria
- State: Styria
- District: Leibnitz

Government
  - Mayor: Hubert Isker (SPÖ)

Area
  - Total: 12.14 km^{2} (4.69 sq mi)
- Elevation: 278 m (912 ft)

Population (2018-01-01)
  - Total: 2,390
  - Density: 197/km^{2} (510/sq mi)
- Time zone: UTC+1 (CET)
  - Summer (DST): UTC+2 (CEST)
- Postal code: 8430
- Area code: 03452
- Vehicle registration: LB
- Website: Website Gralla

Gralla (German: [ˈɡʁala]) is a municipality in the district of Leibnitz in the Austrian state of Styria.

== Geography ==
Gralla lies on the Mur river on Autobahn A9. In the northeast part of the municipality, the Mur is dammed to form a reservoir, which is a popular goal for outings.
