= Arnfels =

- Municipality
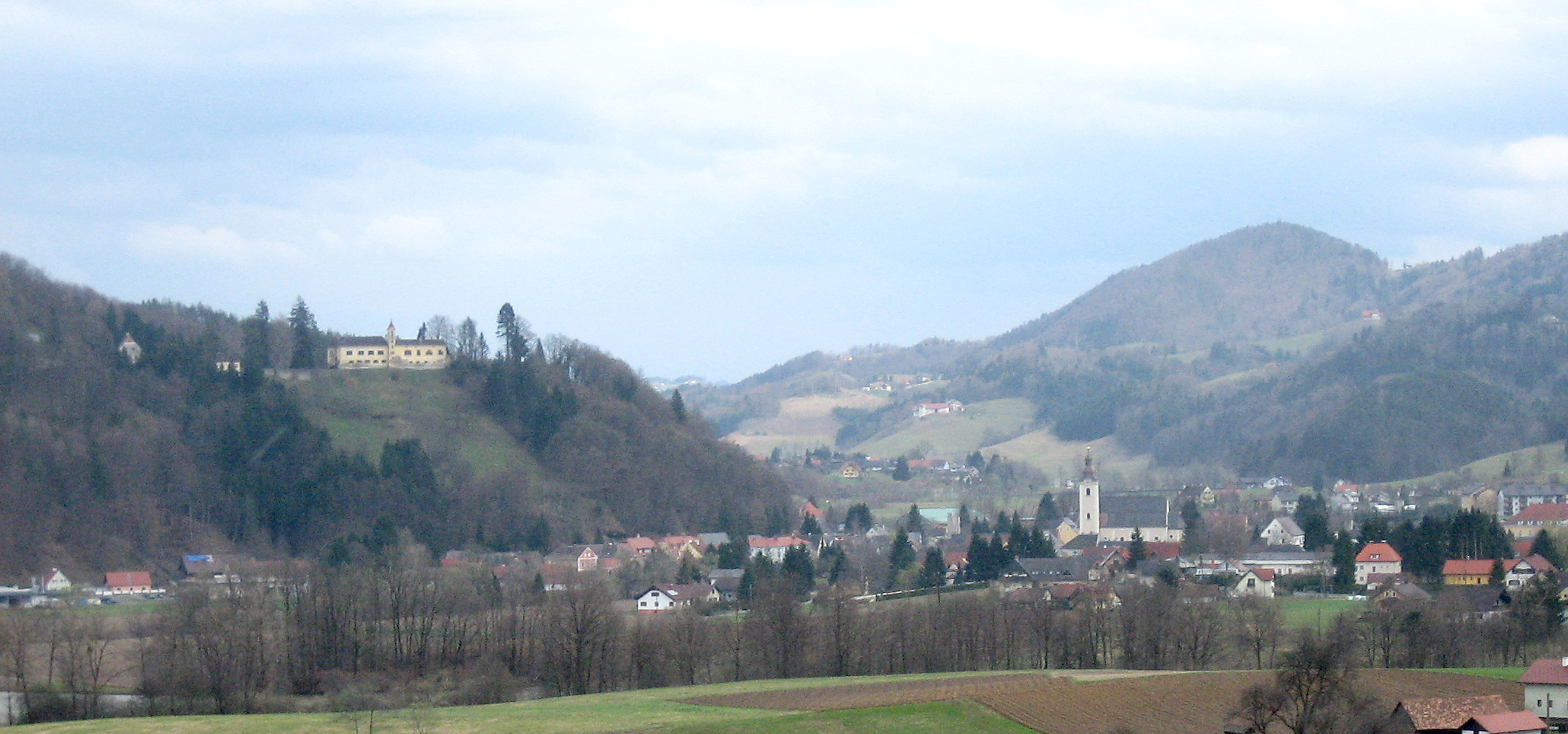
- View of Arnfels

- Coat of arms

- Location within Austria
- Coordinates: 46°40′35″N 15°24′11″E
- Country: Austria
- State: Styria
- District: Leibnitz

Government
  - Mayor: Johann Held (ÖVP)

Area
  - Total: 4.21 km^{2} (1.63 sq mi)
- Elevation: 317 m (1,040 ft)

Population (2018-01-01)
  - Total: 1,013
  - Density: 241/km^{2} (623/sq mi)
- Time zone: UTC+1 (CET)
  - Summer (DST): UTC+2 (CEST)
- Postal code: 8454
- Area code: 0 34 55
- Vehicle registration: LB
- Website: www.arnfels. steiermark.at

Arnfels (Slovene: Arnež) is a municipality in the district of Leibnitz in Styria, Austria.
