= Wildon =

- Municipality
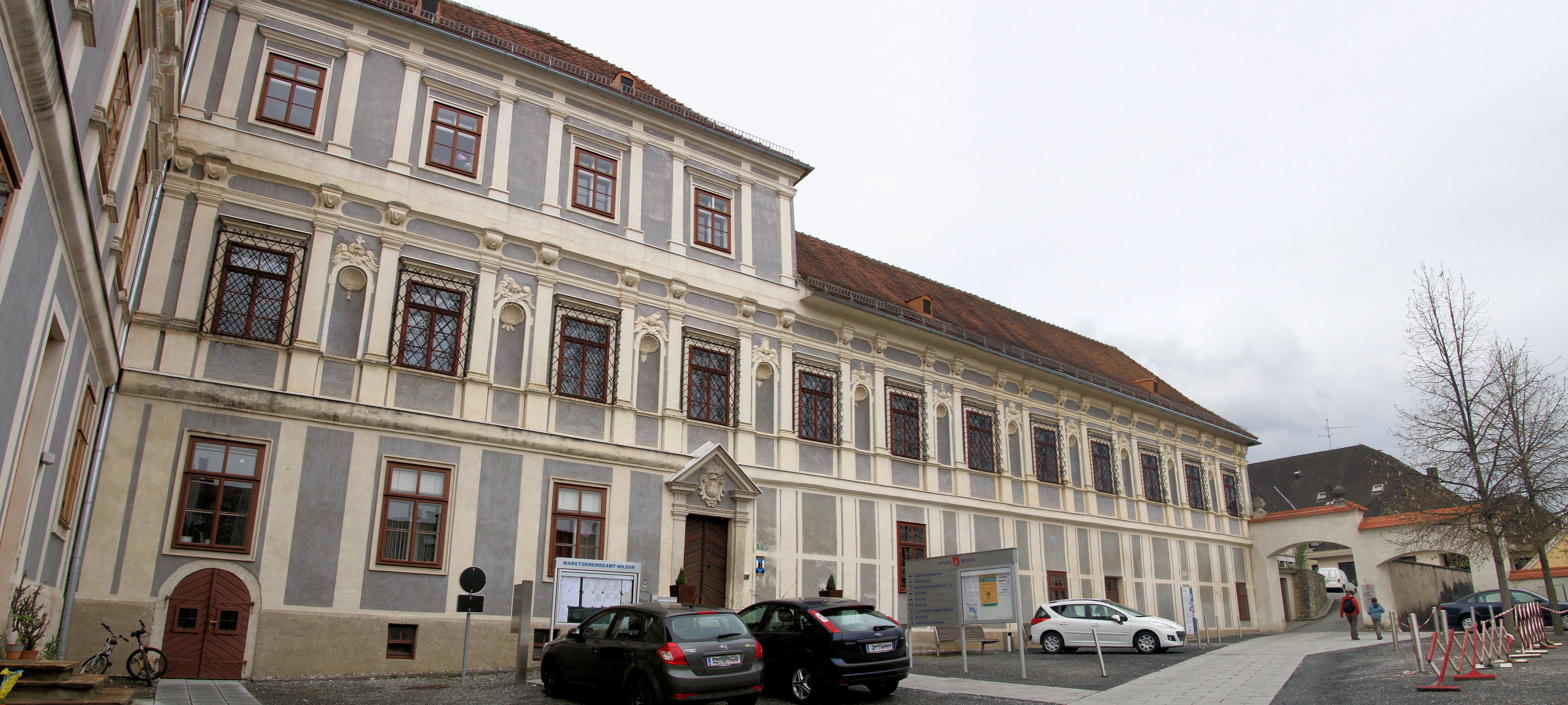
- Wildon town hall

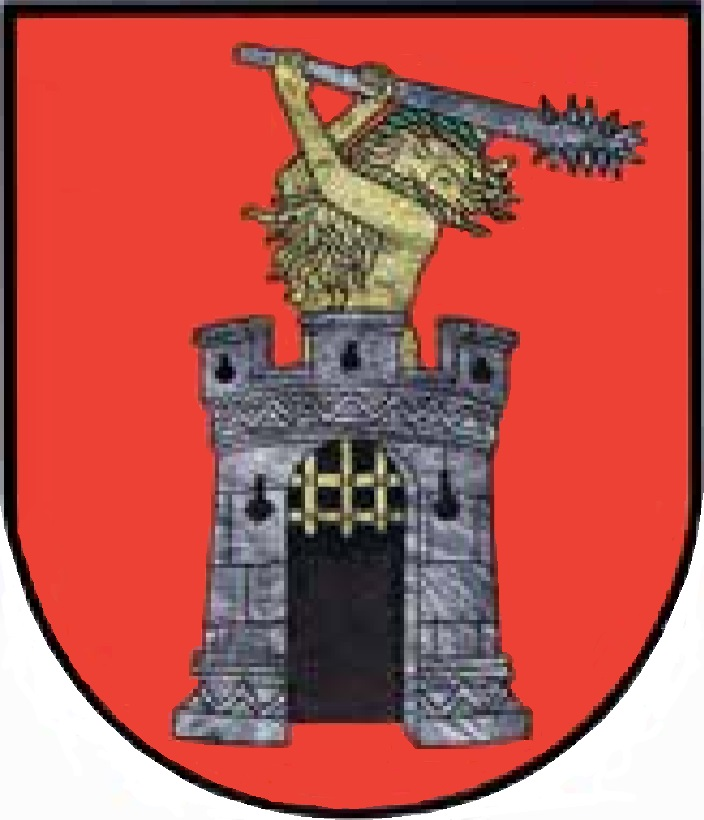
- Coat of arms

- Location within Austria
- Coordinates: 46°53′13″N 15°30′51″E
- Country: Austria
- State: Styria
- District: Leibnitz

Government
  - Mayor: Ing. Gerhard Sommer (ÖVP)

Area
  - Total: 32.72 km^{2} (12.63 sq mi)
- Elevation: 314 m (1,030 ft)

Population (2018-01-01)
  - Total: 5,367
  - Density: 164.0/km^{2} (424.8/sq mi)
- Time zone: UTC+1 (CET)
  - Summer (DST): UTC+2 (CEST)
- Postal code: 8410
- Area code: 03182
- Vehicle registration: LB
- Website: wildon.gemeindeforum.at/

Wildon (German: [vilˈdoːn]) is a small town located between Leibnitz and Graz in the Austrian country of Styria.

== History ==
The modern village of Wildon was first mentioned in 1219. It was mainly known due to a minstrel called Herrand von Wildonie, who lived during the 13th century and was also engaged in local politics. Wildon is also an old Germanic first name. According to legends, Wildon received its name from a wild man who was living in a cave on the nearby Schlossberg hill. Legend has it that a woman living in the village went up to the cave, and killed the wild man with a pair of knitting needles so that the villagers could then go up and enjoy the cave. A medieval ruin is also situated on that hill. The nearby municipality Allerheiligen bei Wildon received its name because of its proximity to Wildon.

In 1918, Rudolf Maister demanded that German troops withdraw to Wildon to ensure Slovenia's "national border".

== Amenities ==
An equestrian center and a lake for swimming, the Wildoner Teich, is to be found in the vicinity. Wildon is situated on a cycle track which runs alongside the Mur river from Graz to Bad Radkersburg.

== Transportation ==
The journey by train from Graz main station to Wildon takes approximately 27 minutes using trains travelling to Spielfeld-Straß.
