= Gleinstätten =

- Municipality
- Coat of arms

- Location within Austria
- Coordinates: 46°45′13″N 15°22′11″E
- Country: Austria
- State: Styria
- District: Leibnitz

Government
  - Mayor: Franz Koller (ÖVP)

Area
  - Total: 21.91 km^{2} (8.46 sq mi)
- Elevation: 308 m (1,010 ft)

Population (2018-01-01)
  - Total: 2,792
  - Density: 127.4/km^{2} (330.0/sq mi)
- Time zone: UTC+1 (CET)
  - Summer (DST): UTC+2 (CEST)
- Postal code: 8443
- Area code: +43 3457
- Vehicle registration: LB
- Website: www.gleinstaetten. steiermark.at

Gleinstätten (German: [glaɪ̯nˈstɛtn̩]) is a market community in southern Austria (state Styria, district Leibnitz) which had 4,232 inhabitants in 2019.

== Geography ==
Gleinstätten is situated west of the Sausal hill range, about halfway between the district cities of Leibnitz and Deutschlandsberg, and approximately 35 km to the south of Styria’s capital, Graz. Its oldest part, with the prominent Renaissance castle, is centered on the eastern and southern edge of a terrace that provides protection against the floods of the river. The villages Prarath, Haslach and Forst (the latter two on the opposite side of the river) are part of the Gleinstätten community.

== History ==
=== Neolithic to Roman history ===
There are very few neolithic finds, and no Bronze Age finds, at Gleinstätten. However, at this time the hill ranges hemming in the Sulm river were used as an east-to-west transit route between the Balkans, the southern parts of the Basin of Graz and what would much later become the Austrian's southernmost province, Carinthia.

In the early alpine Iron Age, from the early 8th century BC to the early 600s BC, a significant Hallstatt culture settlement of more than regional importance existed on the Burgstallkogel, a prominent hill just across the Sulm valley. The inhabitants of this settlement maintained long-range trade relations, and it would have been reasonable for them to keep at least a watch post on the terrace on the opposite side of the valley; however, nothing to this effect has been found so far.

Only in the 5th century B.C., when the Burgstallkogel settlement was already abandoned, a small and rather poor habitation was present north of Gleinstätten. There is also no proof of a settlement at Gleinstätten during Roman rule when the area was part of the province of Noricum, although the remains of a Villa rustica have been identified near the former Burgstallkogel settlement.

=== Middle Ages ===
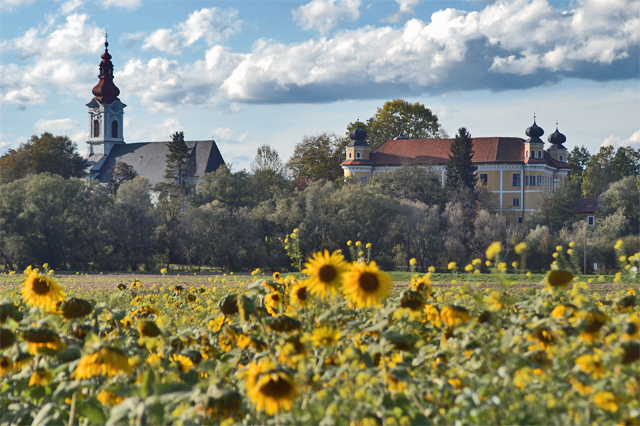
Gleinstätten castle and church

Relief in the north wall of the Gleinstätten church, dated to the 2nd quarter of the 13th century CE

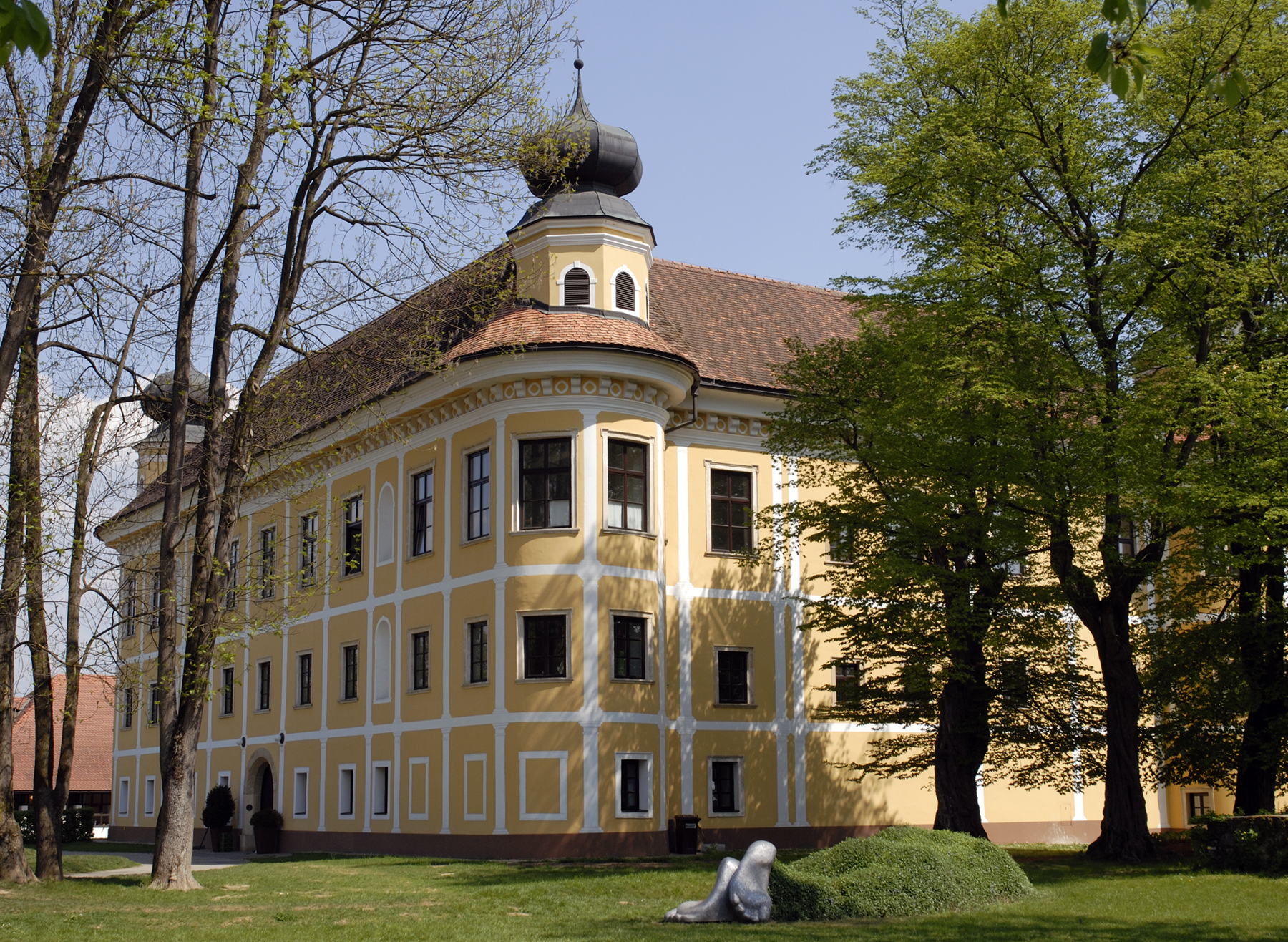
Gleinstätten castle, one of the finest surviving examples of Italian-influenced castle architecture in Austria

The village is first mentioned in 1245 as Micheldorf, a name which could refer to the Archangel Michael to whom many contemporary churches and chapels in the vicinity were dedicated. It could also simply mean "large village" or "the larger village" (as opposed to one or more nearby smaller ones) because in medieval German the prefix "Michel-" stood for "large". The fact that the first known document referring to the adjacent villages Haslach and Prarath dates from 1136 suggests at least a similar age for Gleinstätten which has a much more prominent location. However it seems quite likely that all these settlements date back to the 9th century when the early Bavarians reclaimed the region from the predecessors of the current Slovenians who had loosely settled it after the rule of the Avars had succumbed to Charlemagne. From the Rationarium Styriae (1265) we know that 18 houses in Micheldorf were obliged to pay taxes to king Premysl II Ottokar.

In 1285 ownership of the village passed from the Micheldorfer family to the related Gleinzer family which reported to the archbishop of Salzburg. Their name most certainly traces back to the Old Slavic word root glina, which refers to the abundant clay deposits near the village. In 1523 Balthasar Gleinzer, who had owned Micheldorf since 1515, obtained permission to rename his village Gleinzstätten ("place of the clay"), from which the current name evolved.

=== Renaissance to World War II aftermath ===
The year 1556 marked the conversion of the small medieval fortification at the center of the village to one of the most significant castles in the style of the Italian Renaissance that have been preserved in Austria. It grew toward its current four-wing, three-storey design from 1622 onward when the Zeller family assumed ownership of Gleinstätten. Modifications were made around 1640 and after a fire in 1666, and then again around 1740 after another line of Salzburg nobility, the Khuenburg (Küenburg) family had taken over. This line held formal rule until the Revolutions of 1848, and maintained effective ownership of Gleinstätten (and were frequently elected to public offices) until 1870. In 1907, Pistorf and Prarath seceded from Gleinstätten to form their own municipalities; however, Prarath rejoined in 1965.

During these centuries Gleinstätten experienced war, natural disaster, and epidemics to the same extent as most other places in Austria. Among the most serious events were the following ones:

- 1532 Turkish troops retreating from their abortive Siege of Vienna lay waste to the area
- 1680-1681 The last outbreak of the Black Death (bubonic plague; see Great Plague of Vienna) claims numerous victims
- In 1734 and 1822 fires devastated Gleinstätten
- In 1805 the village suffered from military action and marauding during the War of the Third Coalition
- In 1853 massive hail destroyed the entire harvest
- The year 1916 saw a flood that ruined the agriculture and caused severe damage to traffic routes

World War I claimed a heavy toll on the population of Gleinstätten, and the subsequent loss of Lower Styria in 1919 transformed the entire area into a border district with limited economic perspectives. Although nobility had been legally abolished in Austria, the Wucherer von Huldenfeld family which owned the castle along with many of the local assets enjoyed considerable popularity. They managed to hold on to their estate for some time, and even initiated the first wave of industrialization. However, by 1931 their economic situation had deteriorated so much that the Baron's creditors expelled the family from the castle, which started to fall into disrepair.

=== Recent Past ===
General economic recovery in Austria, increasing attention of the Styrian provincial government to its border regions, and relaxing political relations with Yugoslavia all contributed to a favorable development of the region during the 1960s and 1970s. By this time the decay of the castle had progressed to such a degree that its demolition was acutely considered. However, a strong grass-roots initiative that pushed for preservation was ultimately successful politically as well as in securing financing. Refurbishment commenced in 1976, and in 1978 the carefully restored castle (with its arcaded inner courtyard now covered by a transparent roof) was reopened as a communal building accommodating the local administrative offices and the elementary school. This exemplary revitalization made Gleinstätten a regional cultural attraction and contributed much to its elevation to market township in 1980. Since that time residential construction activity at the periphery of the township has triggered a considerable growth of the population. With its various public schools Gleinstätten has also become a regional educational center.

On 11 September 2010 Gleinstätten (which is transected by the Sulm valley Bundesstraße B74) became the first community in Austria to implement the shared space traffic concept.

== Economy ==
Gleinstätten enjoys a flourishing economy with about 60 local enterprises, from manufacturing to service and industry consulting. Many of these companies are drawing additional benefit from the accession of former Communist countries – especially nearby Slovenia - to the European Union. Tourism traditionally is a strong factor, fuelled by guests who greatly enjoy opportunities for hiking, bicycling and bathing along with the excellent wine and culinary specialties such as pumpkin seed oil. Agriculture maintains a strong position which remains centered on maize grown as food for pigs.

Several industry and commerce enterprises in Gleinstätten have become of more than regional importance. Tondach Gleinstätten AG, majority-owned by world market leader Wienerberger AG, is one of the most significant European manufacturers of construction bricks and roofing tiles. A factory belonging to Assmann enterprises manufactures industry plastics.
