= Klopotec =

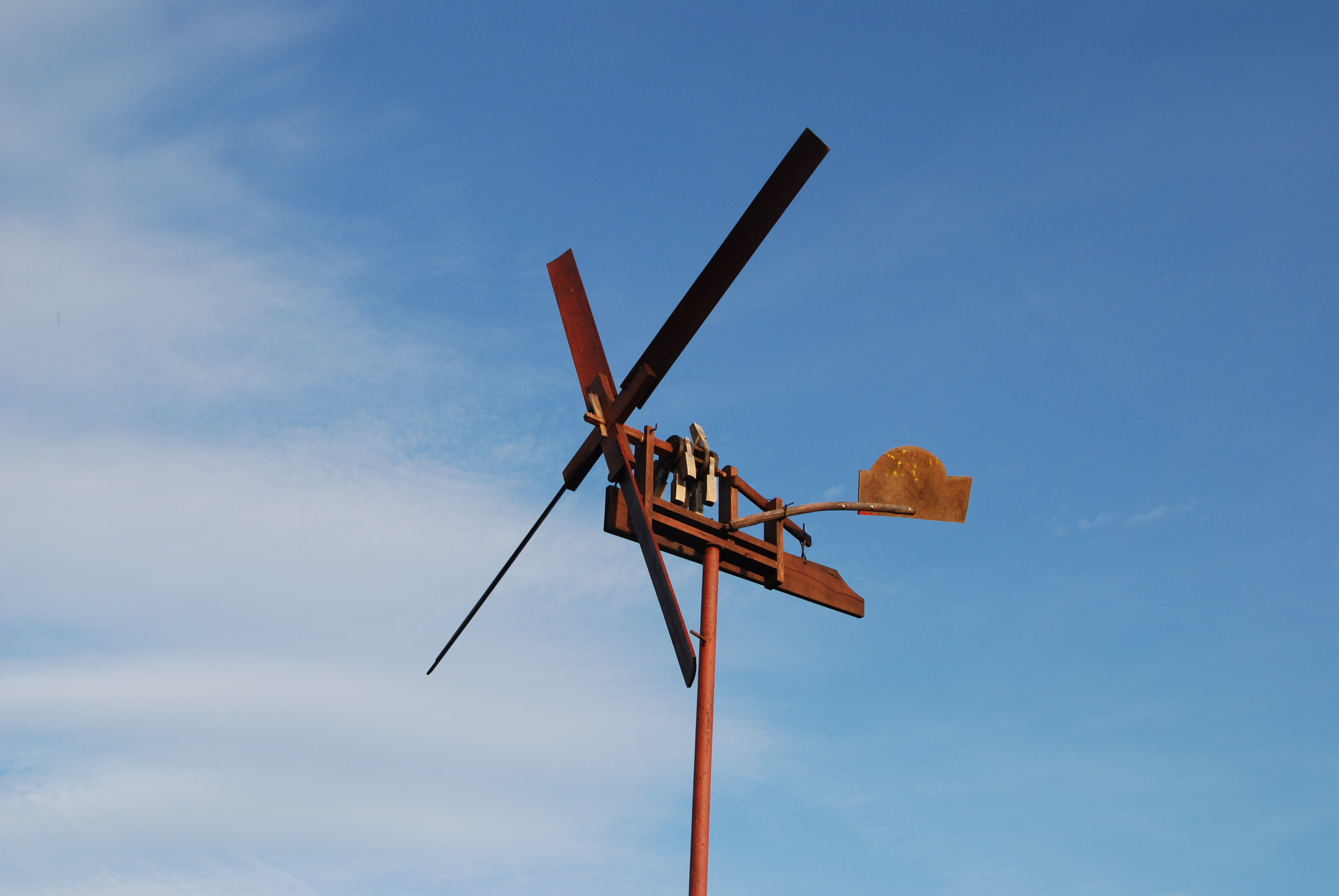
Klopotec in Pavla Vas, Lower Carniola (Slovenia)

A klopotec (pronounced [klɔˈpɔːtəts]) is a wooden mechanical device on a high wooden pole, similar to a windmill. It is used as a bird scarer in the vineyards of traditional wine-growing landscapes of Slovenia, Austria, and Croatia. It is one of the symbols of Slovenia and Styria.

The windmill in the Slovene Hills typically has four blades, and in Haloze six blades, driving an axis with a sail or vane that is constructed to swivel so it is always positioned perpendicular to the wind. As the axis rotates, wooden hammers are lifted off their resting position by fixed notches. As they fall back, they rhythmically impact on a wooden board. While the quality of the sound is dependent on the wood of which the hammers and sounding boards are made, the rattle frequency depends on the number of hammers, as well as changes in wind speed.

The device is used primarily to scare starlings and other birds off the vineyards so that they do not peck grapes. A folk belief also states that klopotecs drive snakes from the vineyards and soften grapes. In Catholic folk music of its region of origin, it is sometimes combined with an organ stop and used as a rural church instrument (e.g. in Gleisdorf parish church).

== Name ==
The device has many names. In Slovene and Kajkavian Croatian it is called klopotec and in some dialects klapoc. Both words derive from klopotati, that is to produce cut off, rhythmic sounds. In German it is called Windradl; ever increasing is the use of the word Klapotetz and also Klapotez. In English it could be described as a bird-scaring rattle, a wind-rattle or a wind-clapper.

== History ==
Although a local historian from Maribor claims that the device appeared in Haloze and in Zagorje already in the 16th century, nothing particular is known about its origin. An educated guess has been made that it developed during the period of the Enlightenment. According to the most plausible theory held by the majority of ethnologists, including the German ethnologist Leopold Kretzenbacher, the bird-scaring rattle is of Slovene origin. Another theory claims that it was first used in the 18th century in the fields by the French.

The first written mentions of klopotec date to the second half of the 18th century, whereas its oldest depictions date to the first half of the 19th century. The device is also mentioned in the oldest Slovene social poem, Lamentation of a Winedresser, written in 1797 by Leopold Volkmer. Archduke Johann of Austria (1782–1859), the youngest brother of the last Holy Roman Emperor Francis II, had it in his vineyard in 1836.

Still earlier than this, however, is the mention of the Klappermühle in German writings from at least the 16th century, which could signify either a true mill intentionally designed to scare birds away especially from fruit trees, or a smaller windmill-like device similar to the klopotec.

== Construction ==
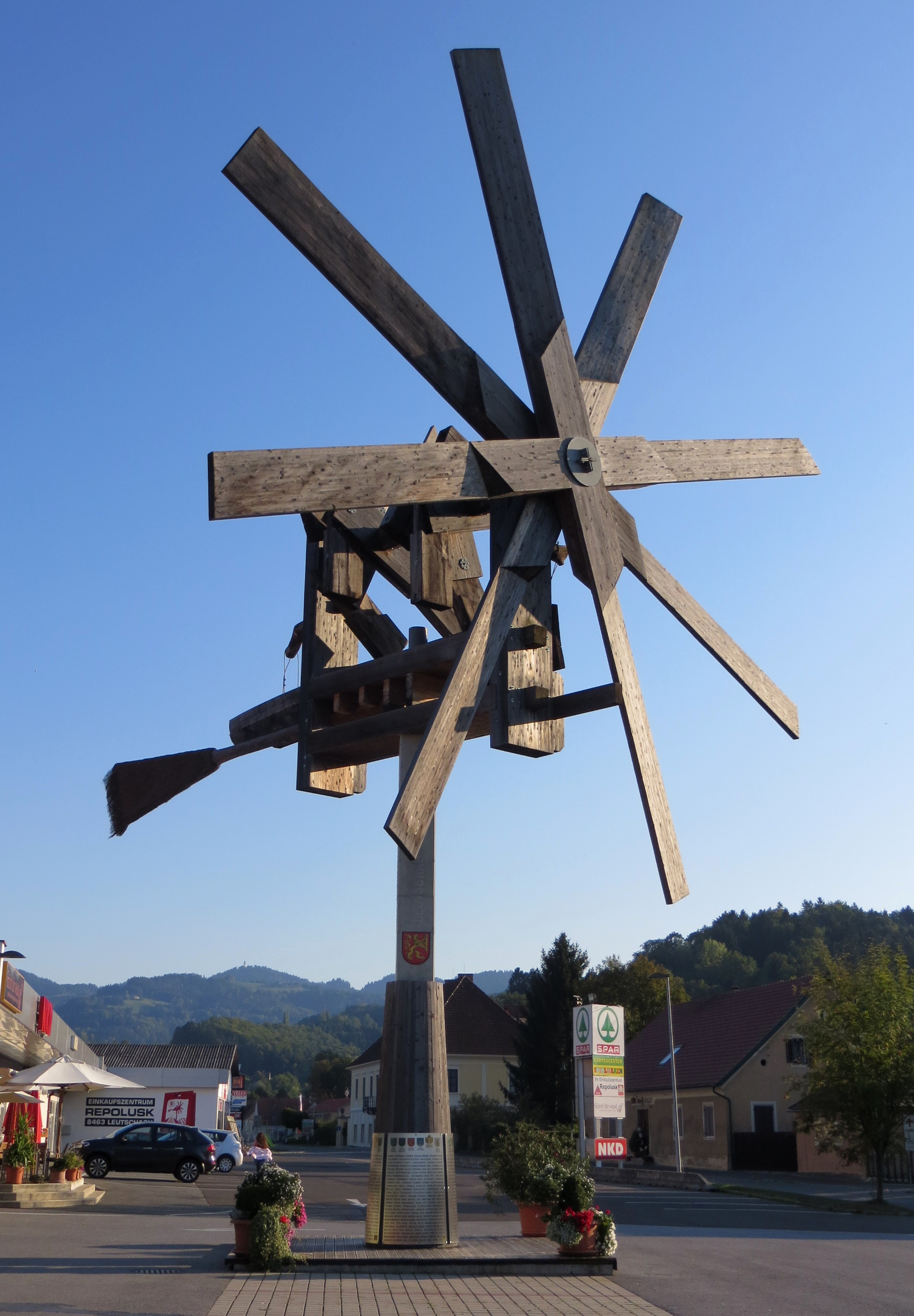
Schloßberg Klapotetz (19 m, 25 tons)

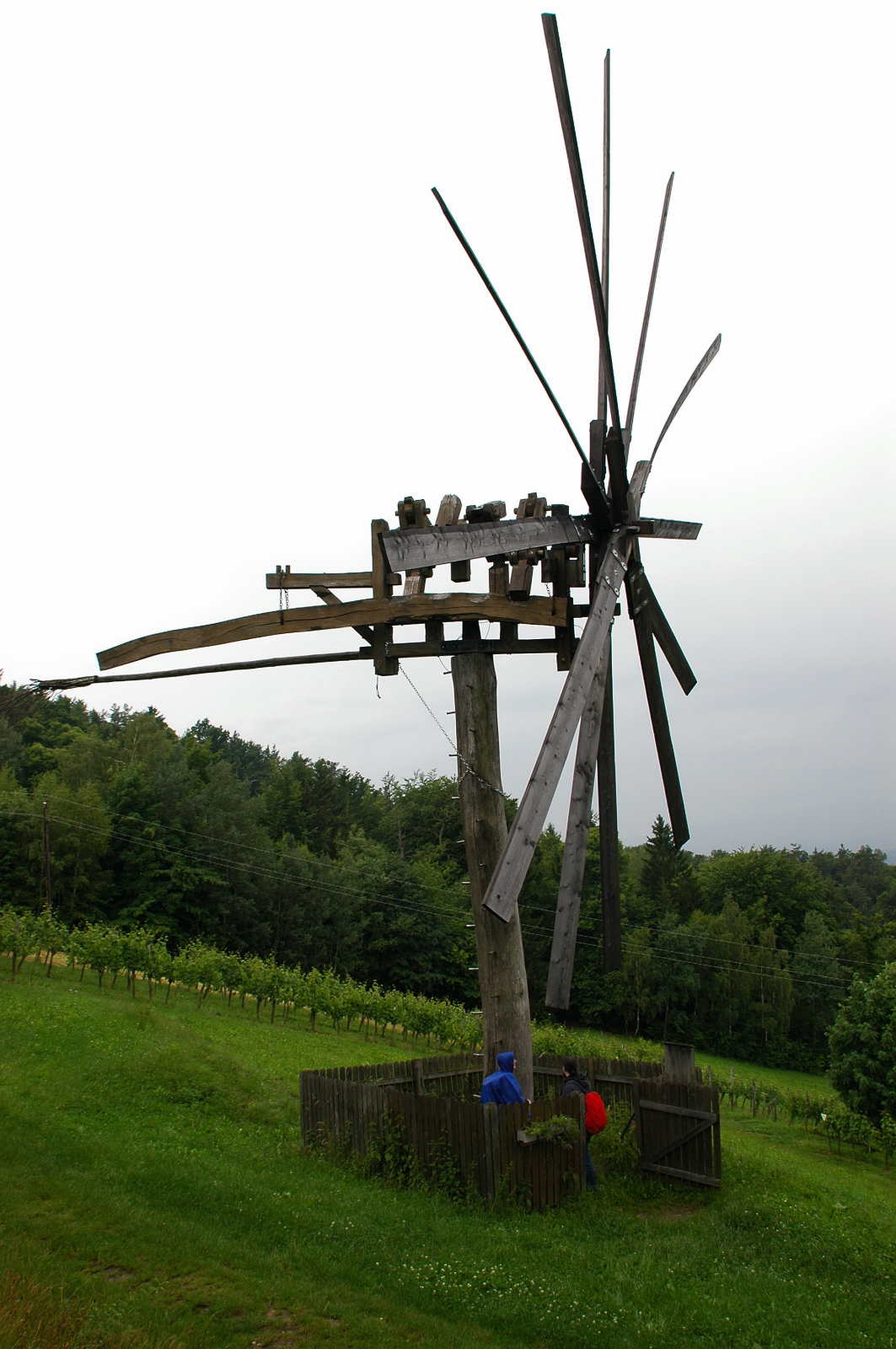
Demmerkogel Klapotetz (16 m, 6 tons)

World's largest klopotec

A klopotec consists of different parts, each of which should (ideally) be made of a specific type of wood to produce a fine and melodic sound. The wood of hammers and of the board is especially important, as only the right combination enables that the device produces the ultrasound that scares the birds away. The parts are:

- stolček (block) - holds the axle; made from a hardwood (e.g. chestnut, oak or ash).
- kvaka (axle) - holes are drilled into it and hammers or macleki are attached onto it.
- macleki (hammers) - should be set up in such a way that only one of them strikes at a time. The best wood is beechwood, but some other types of wood can be used.
- deska (board) - macleki strike against it; made from chestnut or cherry.
- viličice (pl.;little forks) - hold macleki; made from oak or beech.
- verižica (chainlet) - the board is hanged on it.
- rep (tail) - enables the rattle to turn with the wind; made from the sprigs of the oak, pine or other tree, as by these species the leaves remain attached for the longest time. Also an old broom can be used as a tail.
- vetrnica (sail) - rotates in the wind and transfers the rotation onto the axle; made from poplar or fir wood. The sail from the Slovene Hills has four blades, while the one from Haloze has six blades and the one from the Austrian Styria has eight blades.
- zavora (brake) - part of especially large rattles; prevents them from stopping in a forceful wind.

The largest construction of this type in a natural setting stands in the Sausal mountain range, near the summit of the Demmerkogel. It is 16 meters high, and its moving parts mass 3.4 metric tons. Each of the eight hammers weighs 40 kilograms.

== Tradition ==
The klopotec is most frequently heard in the transnational region from Southwest Styria (e.g., the Sausal mountain range and the Weinstraße) to Eastern Slovenia: the Slovene Hills, Haloze and Prlekija (of which it is a symbol), less frequently in Lower Carniola and White Carniola. It is also found in Southwestern Slovenia, in the Littoral Region and in Croatia's Zagorje, Međimurje and Podravina regions. These areas traditionally produce white wines.

Traditionally such rattles have been set up on 25 July (Feast of Saint James) or on 15 August (Assumption Day), but also on any day in between. They have usually been taken down after the vintage till 1 November (All Saints Day), but no later than on 11 November (Feast of Saint Martin). If a husbandman forgets to take it down, the youth from the village can steal it and leave a message about the ransom that he must pay to get it back.

Some of these bird-rattle devices are ornamented with small carved figurines. The traditional types which are made solely from wood are becoming more and more rare, as they are getting replaced by devices with metal elements.

== Motif ==
- The Post of Slovenia issued a stamp worth 13 Slovenian tolars in 1997 featuring klopotec. The stamp was a part of the collection Slovenija - Evropa v malem ("Slovenia - Europe in Miniature").
- One of the meetings of Slovenian folk musicians that happens annually is called Veseli klopotec ("Happy Klopotec").
- The Slovenian Society of Composers, Authors and Publishers for the Protection of Copyright (SAZAS) yearly confers the Zlati klopotec ("Golden Klopotec") award to the author of the best popular song in a Slovene dialect for that year.
