= Sulm (Austria) =

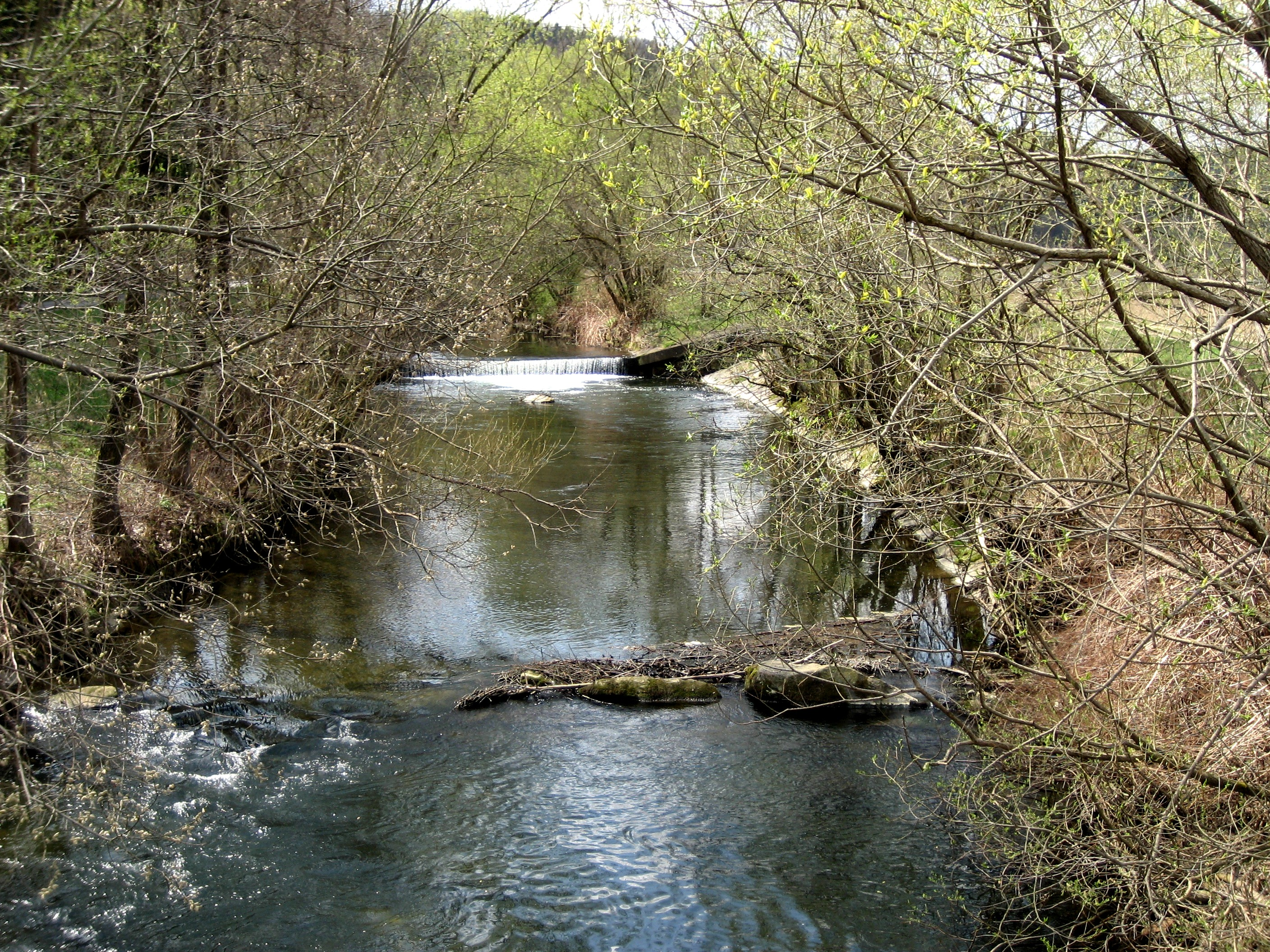

Location
- Country: Austria
- State: Styria

Physical characteristics
- Mouth
  - location: Mur
  - coordinates: 46.7439°N 15.5708°E
- Length: 29.3 km (18.2 mi)
- Basin size: 1,121 km^{2} (433 sq mi)

Basin features
- Progression: Mur→ Drava→ Danube→ Black Sea

The Sulm (Austrian German: [sʊlm]) is a river in Southern Styria, Austria. It is 29.3 km (18.2 mi) long (66.0 km (41.0 mi) including its longer source river Schwarze Sulm). Its drainage basin is 1,121 km^{2} (433 sq mi). Its two source rivers Schwarze and Weiße Sulm both originate at the eastern slopes of the Koralpe (a north-south running mountain range in the Southeastern Alps which separates Styria from Carinthia). It flows eastwards towards the Mur through the districts of Deutschlandsberg and Leibnitz. The Sulm valley runs from the Western Styrian hill ranges to the Eastern Styrian hills and lowlands.

== Geography ==
The main tributaries of the Sulm are the Schwarze Sulm ("Black Sulm", 36.7 km (22.8 mi) long, with Schwanberg as the central market town) and the Weiße Sulm ("White Sulm", 29.3 km (18.2 mi) long, with Wies) which merge near the village of Prarath, upstream of Gleinstätten. It is there where the actual Sulm valley is considered to begin. Further downstream, near Großklein and Fresing, the Sulm proceeds to receive the river Saggau, and - close to Leibnitz - the river Laßnitz, immediately before the Sulm makes a sharp turn to the Southeast and flows almost parallel to the Mur before joining it.

The Sulm runs on top of a thick bed of its own massive quaternary deposits, and therefore the valley bed is now quite flat although (as can be deduced from the remaining terraces on its rims) it must have been steeper initially. The river therefore breached its banks easily, and used to cause frequent major flooding, until it was regulated from the 1960s onward.

A unique geographic feature in the Sulm valley is the Sausal mountain range which has its own mild microclimate, supporting a significant fraction of Styria's wine-growing economy.

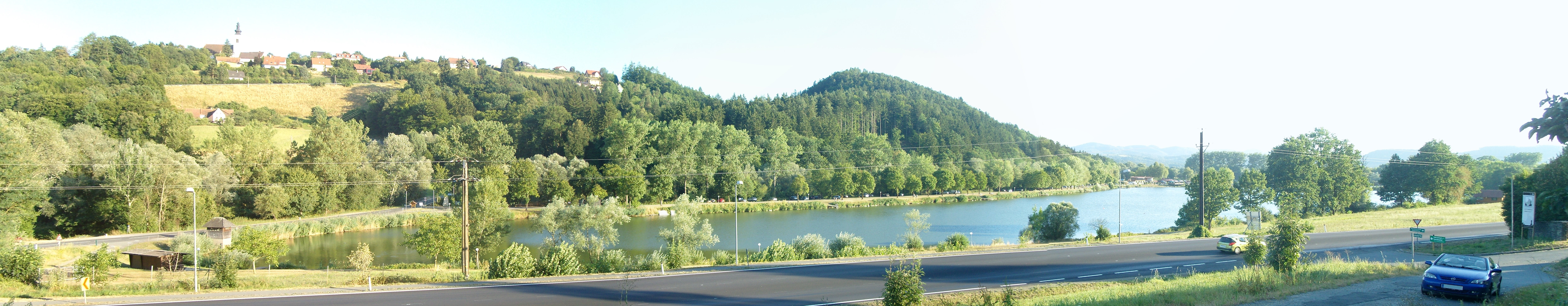
The artificial Lake Sulmsee

== History ==
The Sulm valley has yielded archaeological finds from the Neolithic period onward, illustrating that it has served as an east-west traverse for thousands of years. In the Iron Age, during part of the Hallstatt Culture period, a settlement on the Burgstallkogel between Gleinstätten and Großklein had considerable regional importance. The associated necropolis, part of which can still be seen, is one of the largest and best-preserved in Central Europe although much has been plundered from the late 19th century onward.

The Frauenberg, a hill near Leibnitz, is especially significant in terms of pre-history. Apparently a halidom for female goddesses throughout the Neolithic and Celtic periods, its plateau bore a temple during Roman times when the municipium of Flavia Solva flourished. Recently, one of the largest known cemeteries from the late Roman period has been identified on one of its slopes.

It is believed that the Sulm valley was only minimally (if at all) populated during the Migration Period, after the Romans had withdrawn from the province of Noricum in the 5th century. Records from the 10th and 11th century C.E., when it was resettled by Bavarian emissaries from Salzburg, describe it as swamped and hardly passable.

Many settlements in the lower Sulm valley likely date back to the 9th century when the Bavarians reclaimed the region from the predecessors of the current Slovenes who had loosely settled it after the rule of the Avars had succumbed to Charlemagne. During the 12th century the region became a territory of the church-state of Salzburg, and remained so for more than 400 years. The Khuenburg family, a significant branch of Salzburg nobility, owned large swaths of territory until the late 19th century.

War and natural disasters that affected the eastern and southern parts of today's Austria hardly ever spared the Sulm valley, with the probable exception of migratory locusts of which there is no local record, even during times when other parts of Styria suffered severely. In 1532 Turkish troops retreating from their abortive first Siege of Vienna moved southward along the Mur, and laid waste to a broad swath of land on both sides of the river; their cavalry pillaged, burned and abducted almost unhindered. In 1680 and 1681 the last outbreak of the Black Death (bubonic plague) in Austria claimed numerous victims in the Sulm valley region. In November 1805, during the Napoleonic War of the Third Coalition, invading French troops plundered the region and terrorized the residents.

The Sulm valley region lost many vital connections to the South (especially to the city of Marburg an der Drau, now Maribor) in 1919 when Lower Styria was annexed to emerging Yugoslavia. As a result, the region became more oriented towards the North, and towards the Styrian capital, Graz but also became a "quiet corner" of Austria.

On occasion of a January 1947 special envoy meeting on Austrian affairs that was held in London's Lancaster House, Yugoslavia made territorial claims not only against the southern parts of the Austrian province of Carinthia (where the population had voted to remain with Austria in the Carinthian Plebiscite of 1920), but also against parts of Southern Styria which were completely Austrian. Josip Broz Tito's close advisor, Joze Vilfan, presented a memorandum that would have made the Sulm a border river. The split that occurred between Tito and Stalin shortly thereafter caused the USSR to withdraw its initial support of these demands, and together with the uncompromising attitude of the British occupation forces in Styria this caused the Yugoslav plan to collapse completely. Today the Sulm region and Slovenia have long put the past behind them, and entertain very friendly relations.

From 1907 to 1967, a railway line was operated in the valley which merged with the Austrian Southern Railway at Leibnitz. Many of the original station buildings and some steel railway bridges still exist. Only a short part of the railroad line at Gleinstätten is still in use. Those parts of the groundworks that had not been removed during the following decades have now mostly been converted to a biotope, providing shelter for the local fauna and flora and offering a distant reflection of what the Sulm valley bottom had been before it was diverted to the present intense agricultural use.

== Economy ==
The soil of the Sulm valley is rich, and its economy is characterized by agriculture (mostly maize, but recently also alternative crops) and - on the hillsides and in the Sausal mountain range - also wine. A key vegetable product (not only of the Sulm valley but of the entire region) is pumpkin seed oil, an EU-protected specialty.

Tourism, mainly in the form of hiking and cycling, has developed into a significant economic factor. Mostly from the 1970s onward, a service economy has also begun to flourish in the Sulm valley.

Some areas show significant deposits of clay. In earlier times, when peasants went barefoot except on Sundays or special occasions, the clay sticking to their feet made them yellowish-brown and therefore they were nicknamed Gelbfüße ("yellow-feet"). Especially at Gleinstätten these deposits have long been exploited for brick manufacturing. Tondach Gleinstätten AG (part of the Wienerberger AG public construction material company) is of significant importance to the regional economy. Two factories of the Assmann Group, at Leibnitz and Gleinstätten, are another major contributor.
