= Burgstallkogel =

Hill in Austria

Coordinates: 46°44′52″N 15°24′34″E

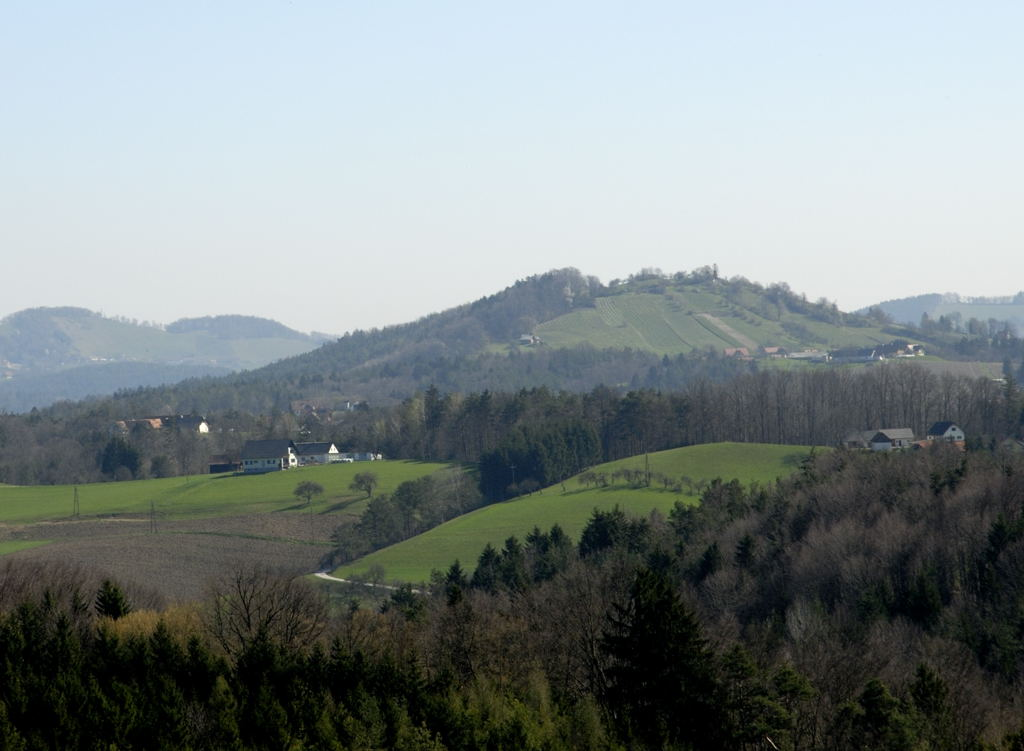
The Burgstallkogel from the West, as seen from the Georgenberg

The Burgstallkogel (458 meters or 1563 feet; also known as Grillkogel) is a hill situated near the confluence of the Sulm and the Saggau river valleys in Southern Styria in Austria, about 30 km south of Graz between Gleinstätten and Kleinklein. The hill hosted a significant settlement of trans-regional importance from 800 BC to about 600 BC. Surrounding the hill is one of the largest Iron Age necropolises in continental Europe, originally composed of at least 2,000 tumuli.

== Geography ==
The Burgstallkogel is prominently situated on a ridge that runs from east to west, straddling the southern banks of the Sulm valley, on a trade route that crossed the Koralpe mountain range from Carinthia, connecting to the southern parts of the basin of Graz and onward to the Hungarian plains. The settlement apparently controlled long-distance trade along this route, which had been in use since Neolithic times, and prospered from it. The community exchanged goods far into Italy and into the Balkans, and might have exploited the iron ore deposits that exist on the hill.

== Settlement history ==
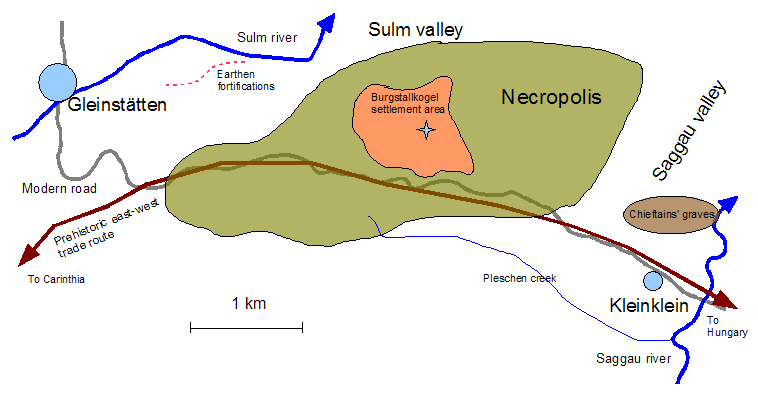
Situation sketch of the Burgstallkogel settlement and its associated necropolis

The first significant habitation on the hill was established during the late Urnfield culture period around 800 BC, when hilltop settlements became common in continental Europe. Although the name "Burgstallkogel" (a generic German popular term for a hill fortification) suggests that historical knowledge of the hill persisted until the Middle Ages, very little was known to archaeological science until 1982-1984 when an exploratory dig established facts which led to significant improvements of our conception of the "Sulm Valley Subgroup" of the Eastern Hallstatt culture.

Four cultural layers were identified containing pottery ranging from the late Urnfield culture to the mid-Hallstatt culture period (Ha B2/3 to Ha B3/C1). Erosion has destroyed the youngest layers of the late Hallstatt period, especially on the summit where nobility is likely to have resided. While the earliest settlement traces are believed to extend over much of the hill on all its sides (the southern slopes are covered by vineyards and are almost impossible to investigate archeologically), the settlement contracted towards the mountain top after it was destroyed by fire twice (around 750 and 700 BC) during the subsequent Hallstatt period. It was essentially abandoned shortly after 600 BC. The Burgstallkogel settlement itself was not fortified (although a system of Hallstatt-era trenches was found close to the Sulm valley bottom at the northwestern side of the hill, which is most exposed to attacks), and archeology gives no indications that it ever suffered from war; the two catastrophic fires seem to have been accidental.

One of these fires destroyed a house containing the largest vertical loom from the Hallstatt era that has ever been identified in Central Europe. The fact that the stone weights of this loom remained in situ when it collapsed allowed its reconstruction, adding a valuable piece of knowledge to our conception of advanced woven-textile manufacturing technology during the central European Iron Age. This illustrates that the Burgstallkogel population had a comparatively high standard of living (though not as high as is typical for the Western Hallstatt culture), which can also be inferred from the fact that the inhabitants slaughtered their cattle at a relatively young age.

In 2004, reconstructions of typical mid-Hallstatt period houses (a residential building, a granary and a bakery) were erected on the western slope of the hill employing experimental archaeology methods. However, the findings from the digs offer no proof that these buildings resemble any actual situation at the Burgstallkogel settlement during this period.

== The necropolis and its investigation ==
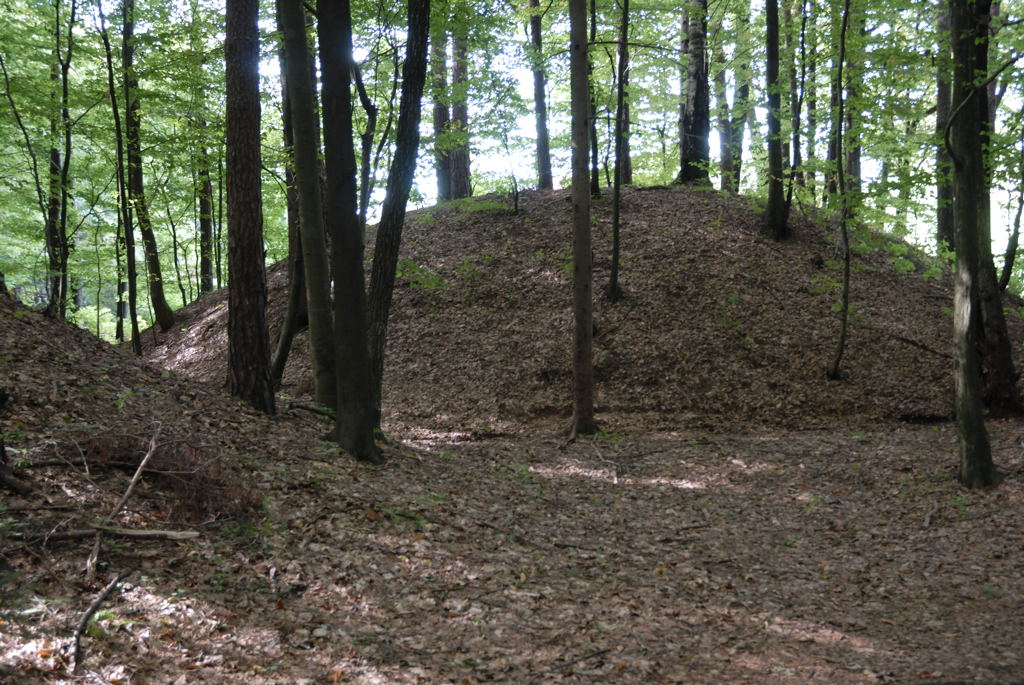
Hallstatt-era tumulus in the Sulm valley necropolis

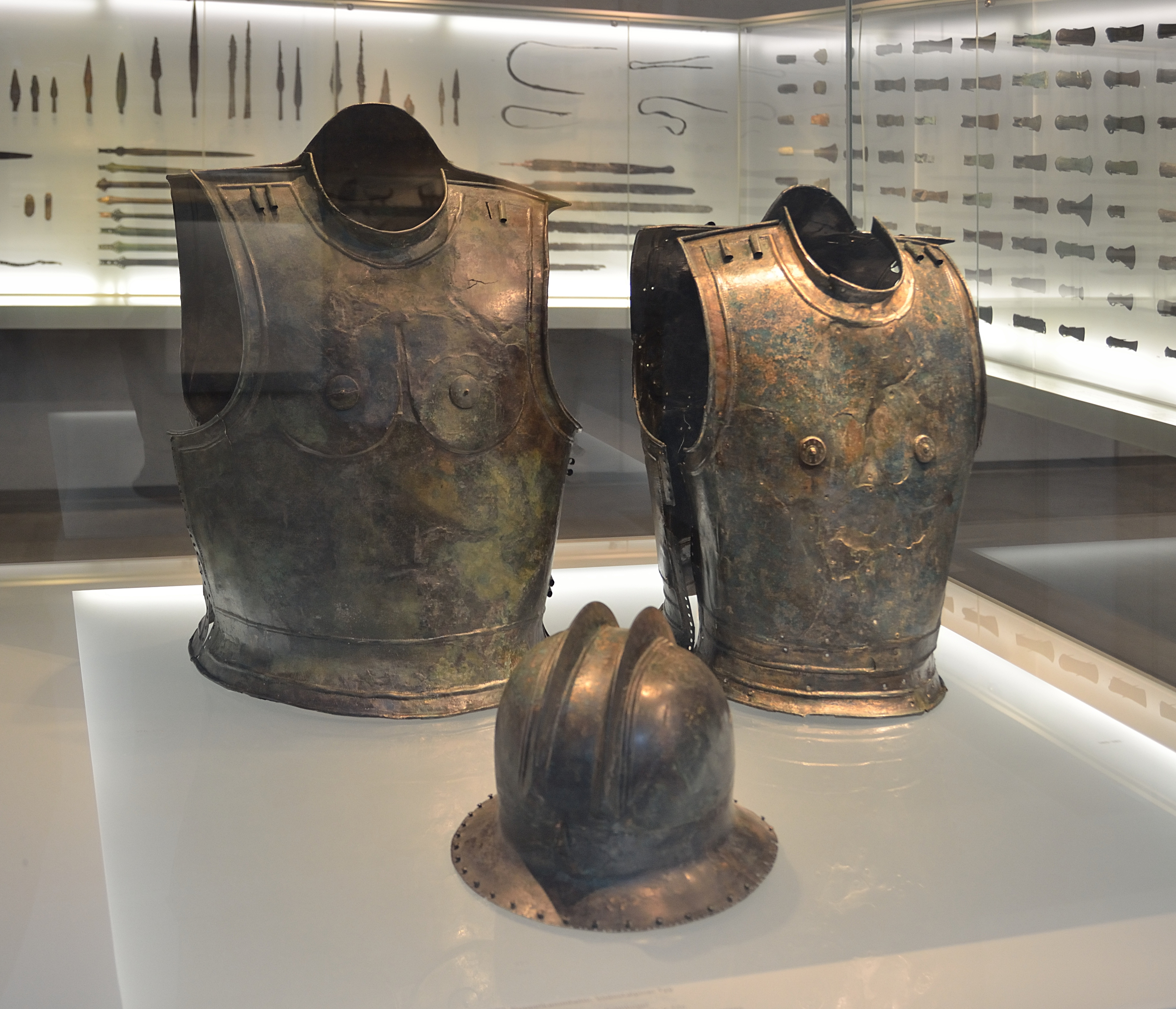
Hallstatt period cuirasses and helmet from Kleinklein, Eggenberg Palace museum

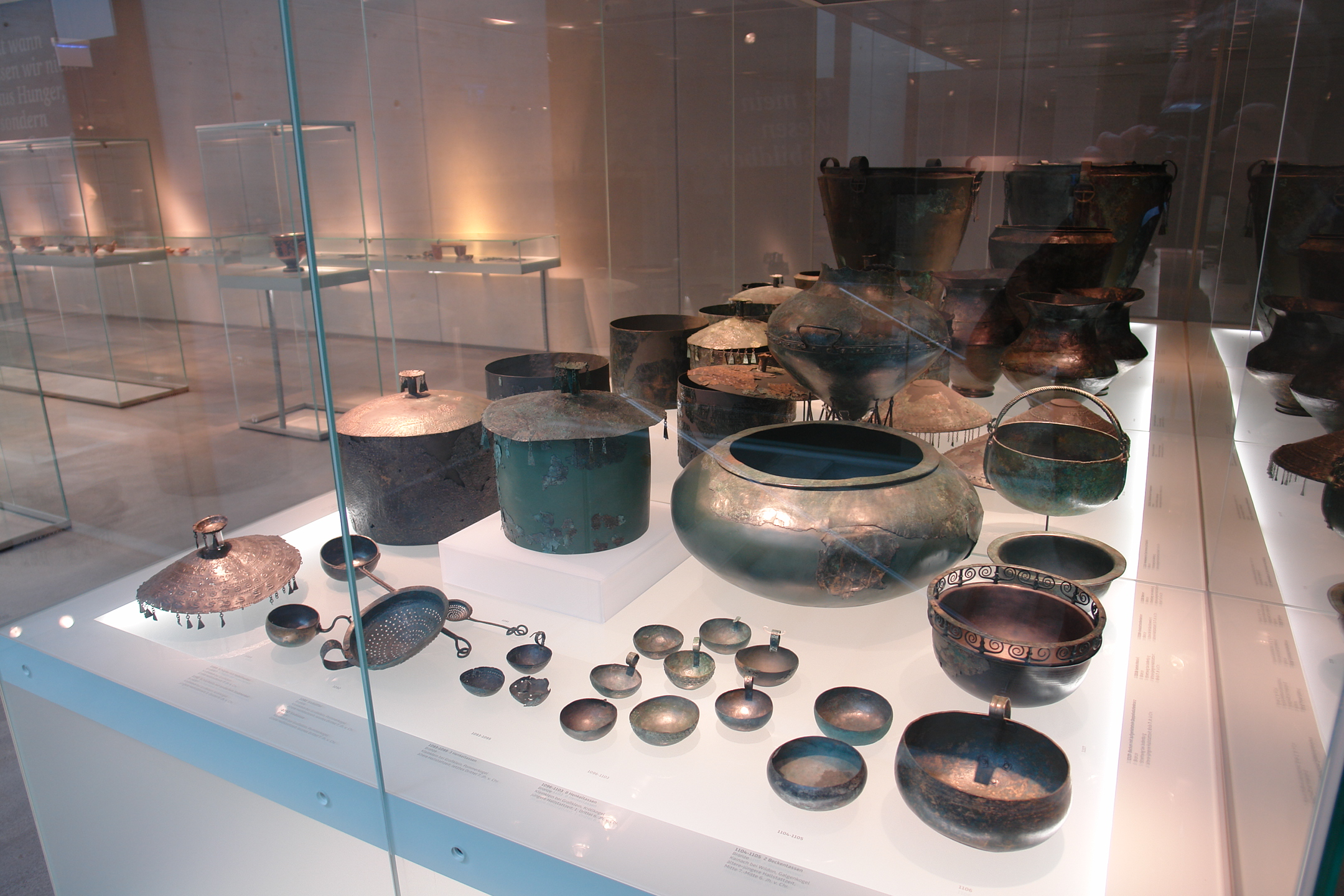
Metal vessels from Kleinklein, Eggenberg Palace museum

In contrast to the grave mounds in the Western Hallstatt zone where the deceased were mostly buried intact, all Burgstallkogel dead were cremated, frequently together with some of their personal articles, before the remains were deposited in the stone grave chamber and earth was piled on it to erect the tumulus.

The "common citizen" tumuli of the Sulm valley necropolis (believed to have numbered in excess of 2,000 before agriculture destroyed most of them) surrounded the Burgstallkogel settlement on all sides, and originally they covered much of the hill range between Gleinstätten and the village of Kleinklein, where a small area had been set aside for the much larger tumuli of the chieftains. The oldest grave mounds in the necropolis correspond to the youngest surviving settlement strata of the Burgstallkogel settlement, while two later (Hallstatt B3/C1) burial phases can only be inferred from secondary deposits. Besides being larger than most other necropolises in the Eastern Hallstatt area, the Sulm valley necropolis is set apart by the fact that preserved non-aristocratic burials far outnumber the nobility's graves.

Today the surviving tumuli appear clustered in well-defined and dense groups. Most likely, this does not reflect a design from the Hallstatt period but rather the persistence of larger tumuli which were better able to resist human interference and natural erosion, or were protected from both by forest growing over them.

The hill graves have been a natural part of the local population's environment for centuries, and were surrounded by much folklore. The first crude excavations date back to 1844, and some finds were on display during the 1873 World Exposition in Vienna. The first systematic scientific efforts were made by four officials: E. Pratobevera in 1856-1857, and Radimský, Szombathy and Gurlitt between 1881 and 1883 on behalf of the Austro-Hungarian and Styrian Anthropological Societies.

The excavations continued throughout World War I and into the 1930s. After a long lapse during World War II and the post-war era, they resumed in 1972. As is the case at all other well-known archaeological sites, modern professional grave robbers (many equipped with metal detectors which have only very recently been outlawed in Austria) have since caused much damage through their unscientific efforts but have also made finds of some significance which found their way into the public domain.

There are also several flat graves in the Burgstallkogel area, which date back to the 10th century BC.

== The chieftains' graves ==
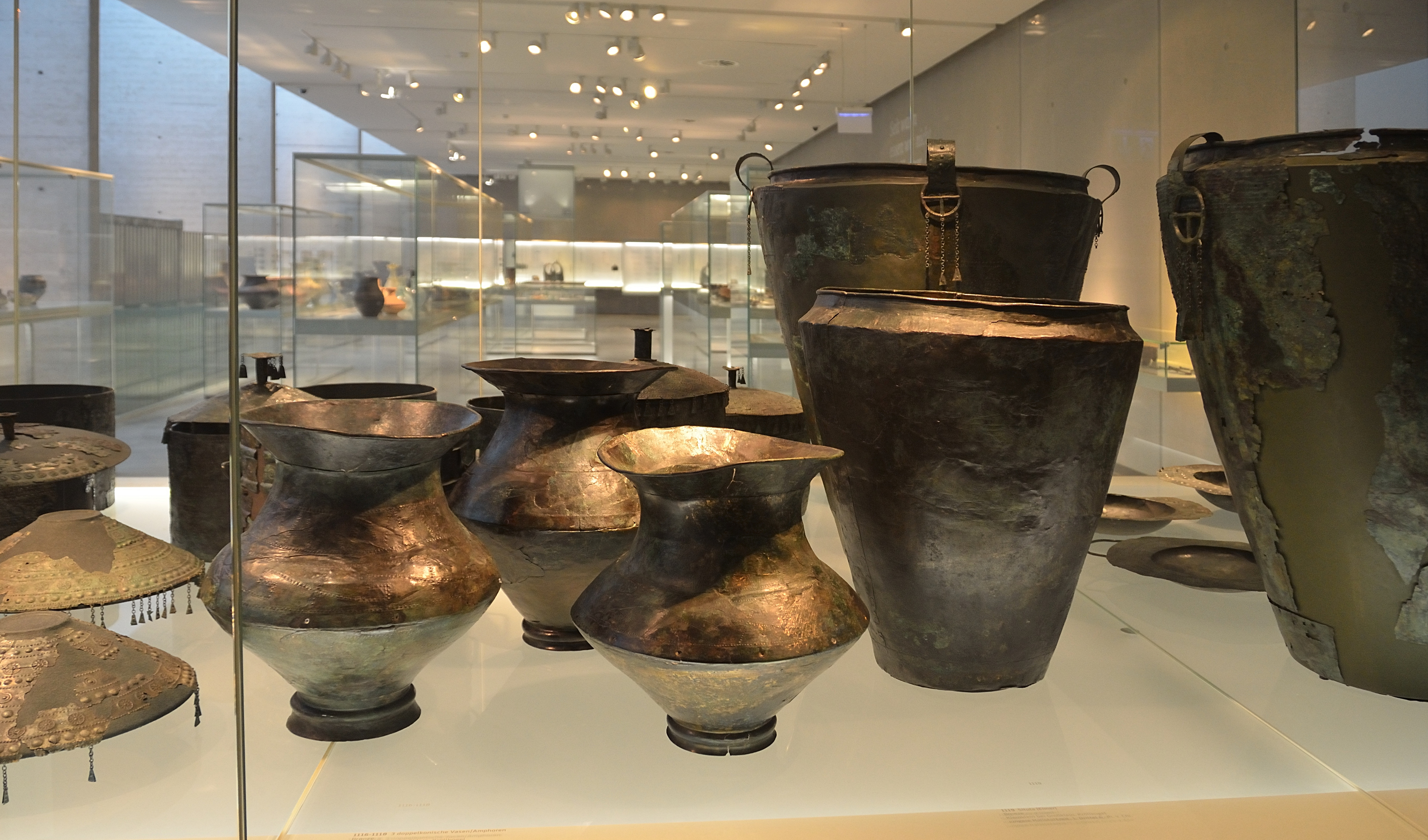
Bronze vases and situlas from Kleinklein, Eggenberg Palace museum

The rulers and their aristocracy, which prided itself on military leadership, had the easternmost part of the necropolis to themselves. Naturally, their tumuli (of which four are known - Hartnermichelkogel I and II, Pommerkogel and Kröllkogel) were the largest and richest ones, containing significant amounts of bronze vessels and iron armament in addition to pottery. It is assumed that the chieftains' tumuli were modeled on Etruscan tombs. The cremation places have not been found, but are supposed to have been either near the grave site or near the hilltop.

The Kröllkogel was the last hill grave to be set up for a chieftain ruling the Burgstallkogel settlement, most likely dating to the first half of the 6th century BC. It had been scientifically probed (and clandestinely robbed) many times from the mid-1900s onward. (Among weapons and impressive bronze vessels, these early and badly documented digs yielded the famous small face mask with the pair of hands which subsequently became a symbol for the necropolis). A final and total excavation of this large tumulus, conducted in 1995 following thorough geomagnetic and geoelectric prospections, unveiled an astounding amount of previously ignored pottery (much of it ritually smashed for the burial), and other very remarkable findings, including osteological proof of cremation of three people (two male, one female), several animals, and a bronze sword that was already about 200 years old (and outmoded for actual combat) when it was burnt and buried alongside the deceased ruler. The central burial chamber was 8 x 8 m in size. From measurements and comparisons with similar graves in Slovenia, an original tumulus diameter of 40 m and an original height of 12 m could be inferred.

== Museum ==
The Hallstattzeitliches Museum Großklein was opened in 1990. In 2004, a Hallstatt period residential building, granary and a bakery were reconstructed on the western slope of the Burgstallkogel.

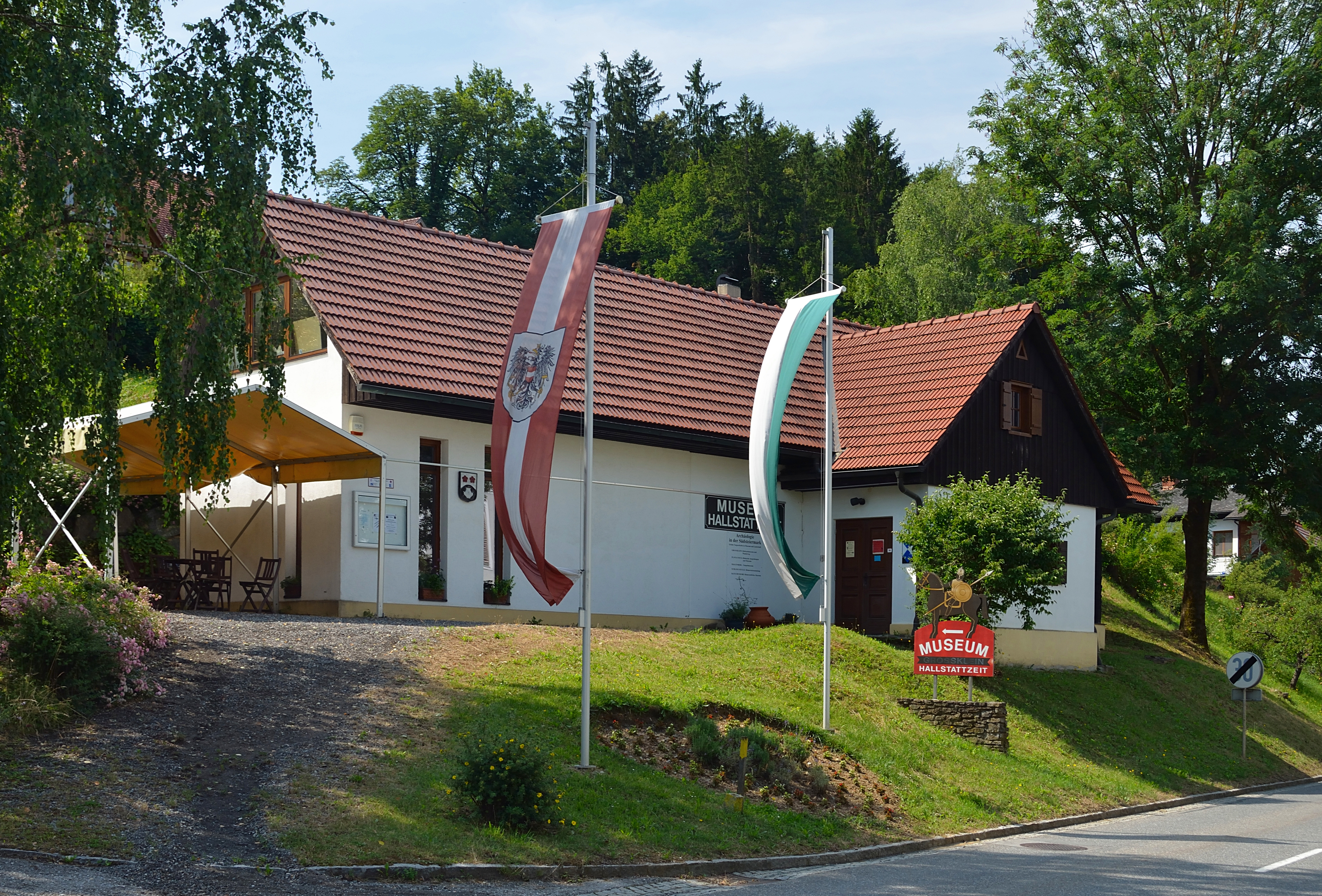
Hallstatt culture museum, Grossklein

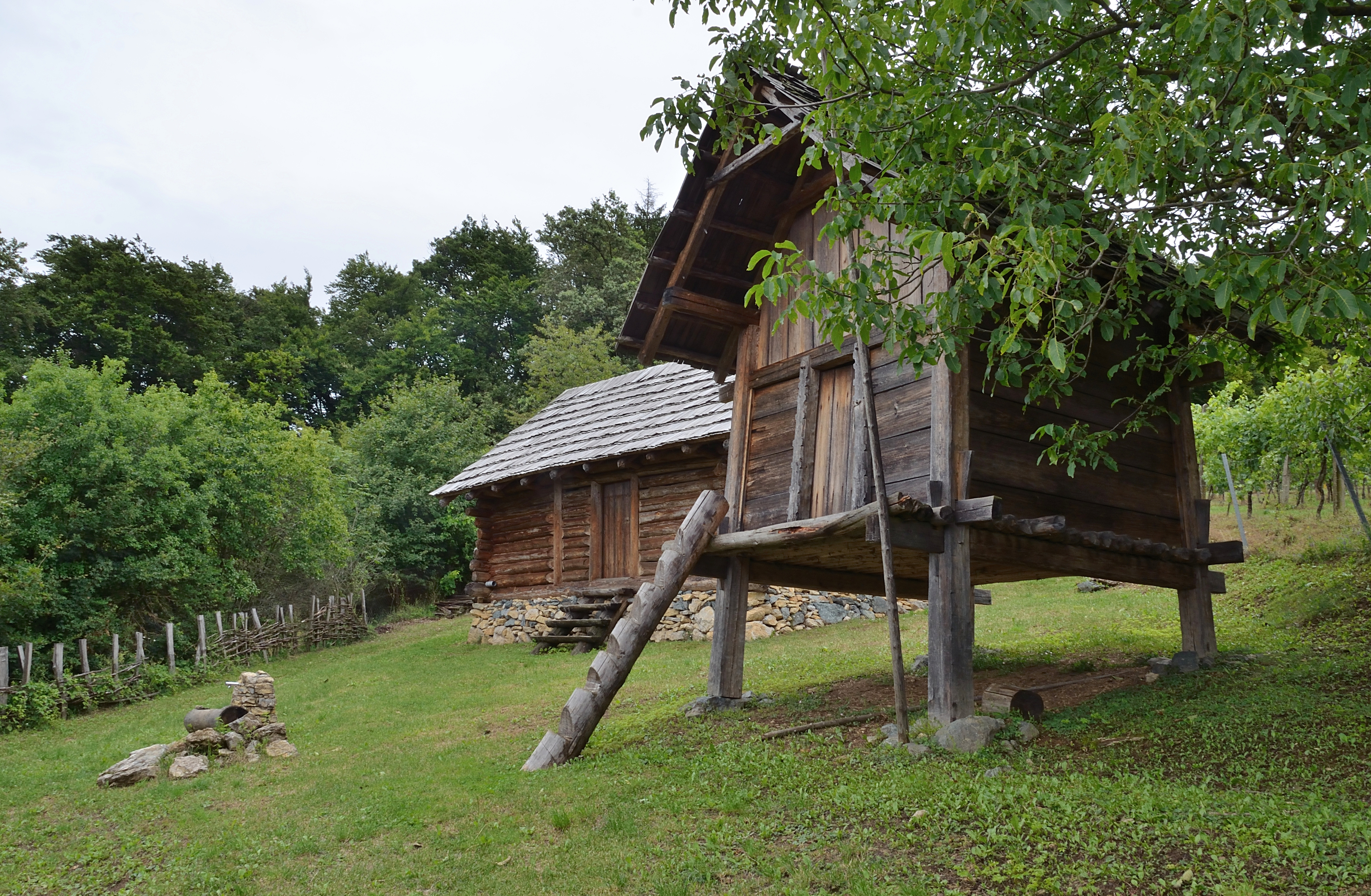
Reconstruction of Hallstatt-era buildings: House (left) and granary (right)

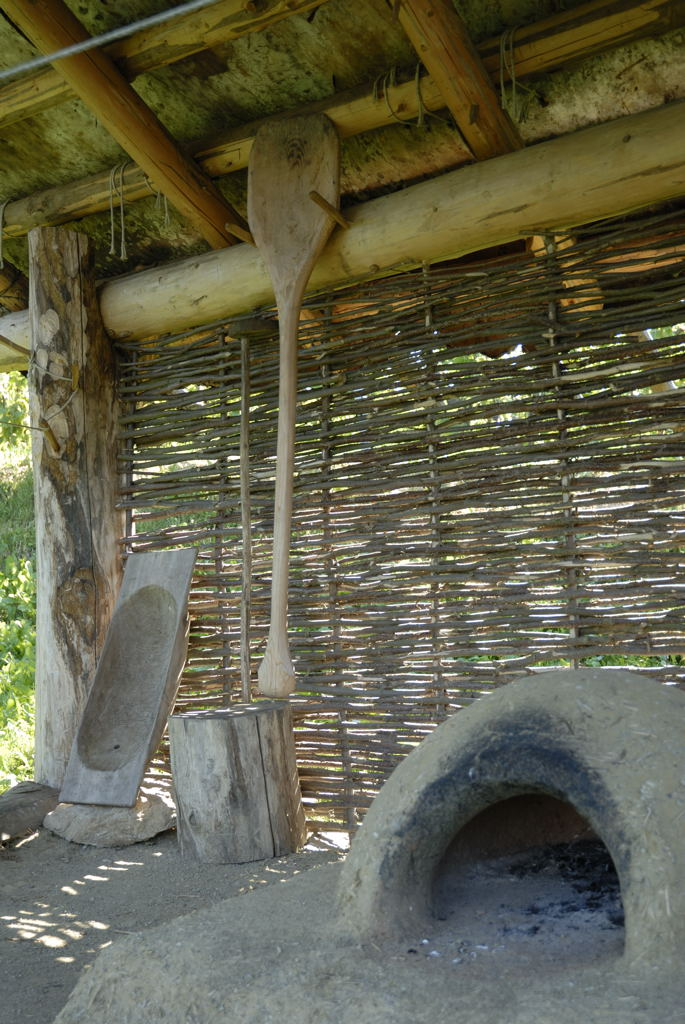
Reconstruction of a Hallstatt-era bakery

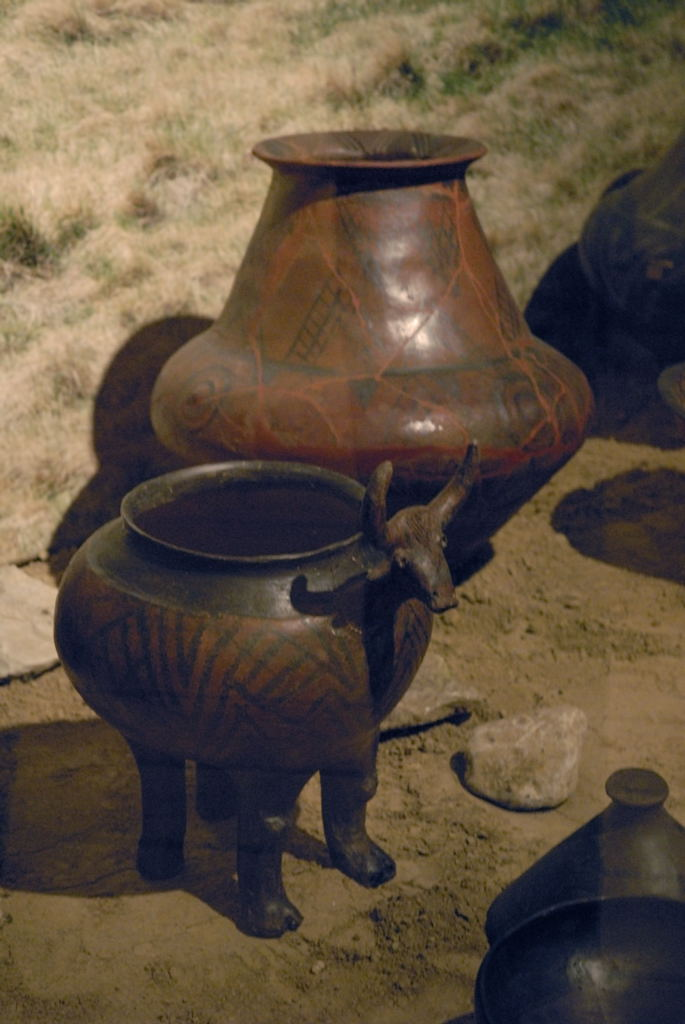
Pottery from the Sulm valley necropolis

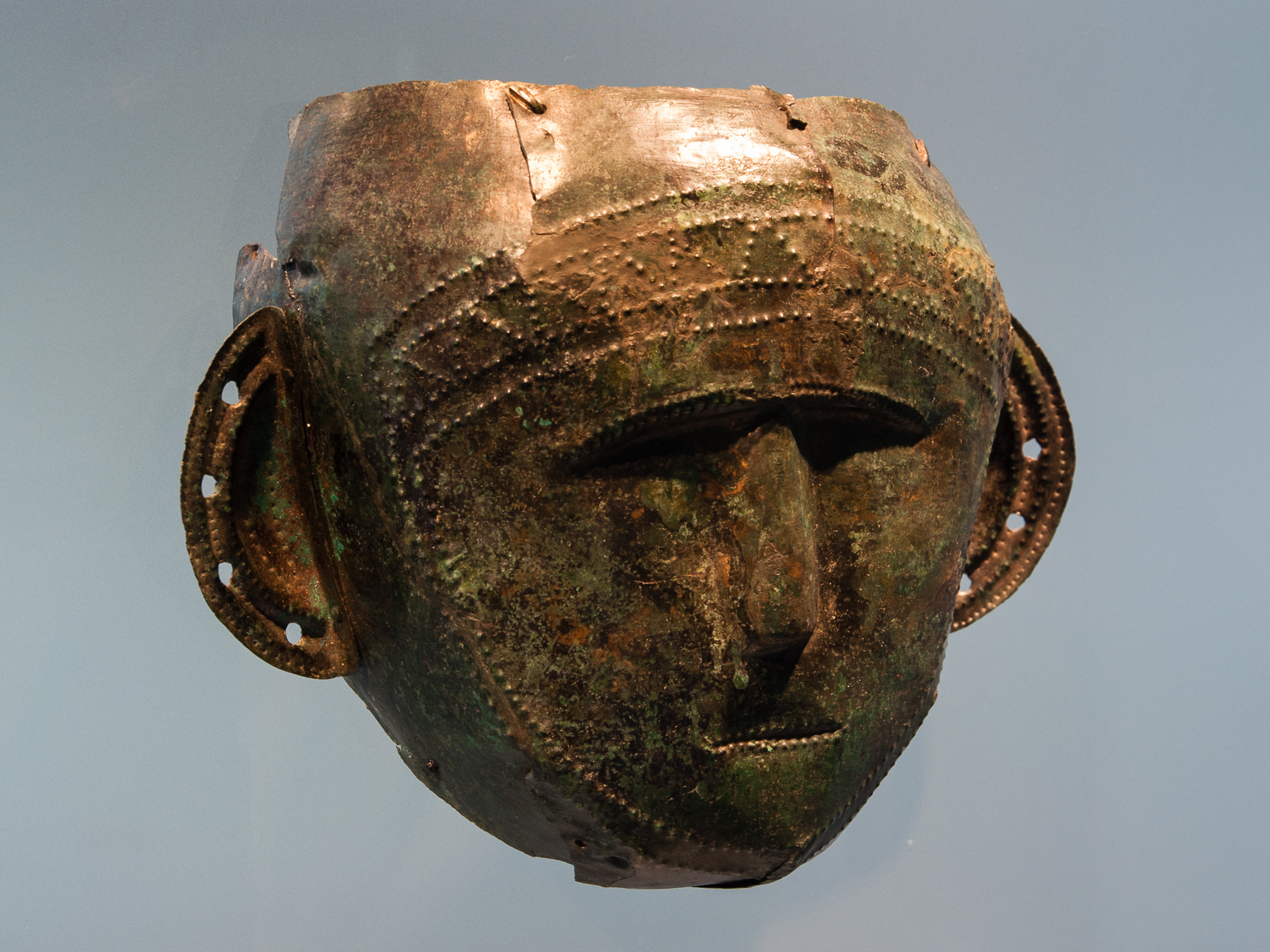
Bronze Mask from Kleinklein

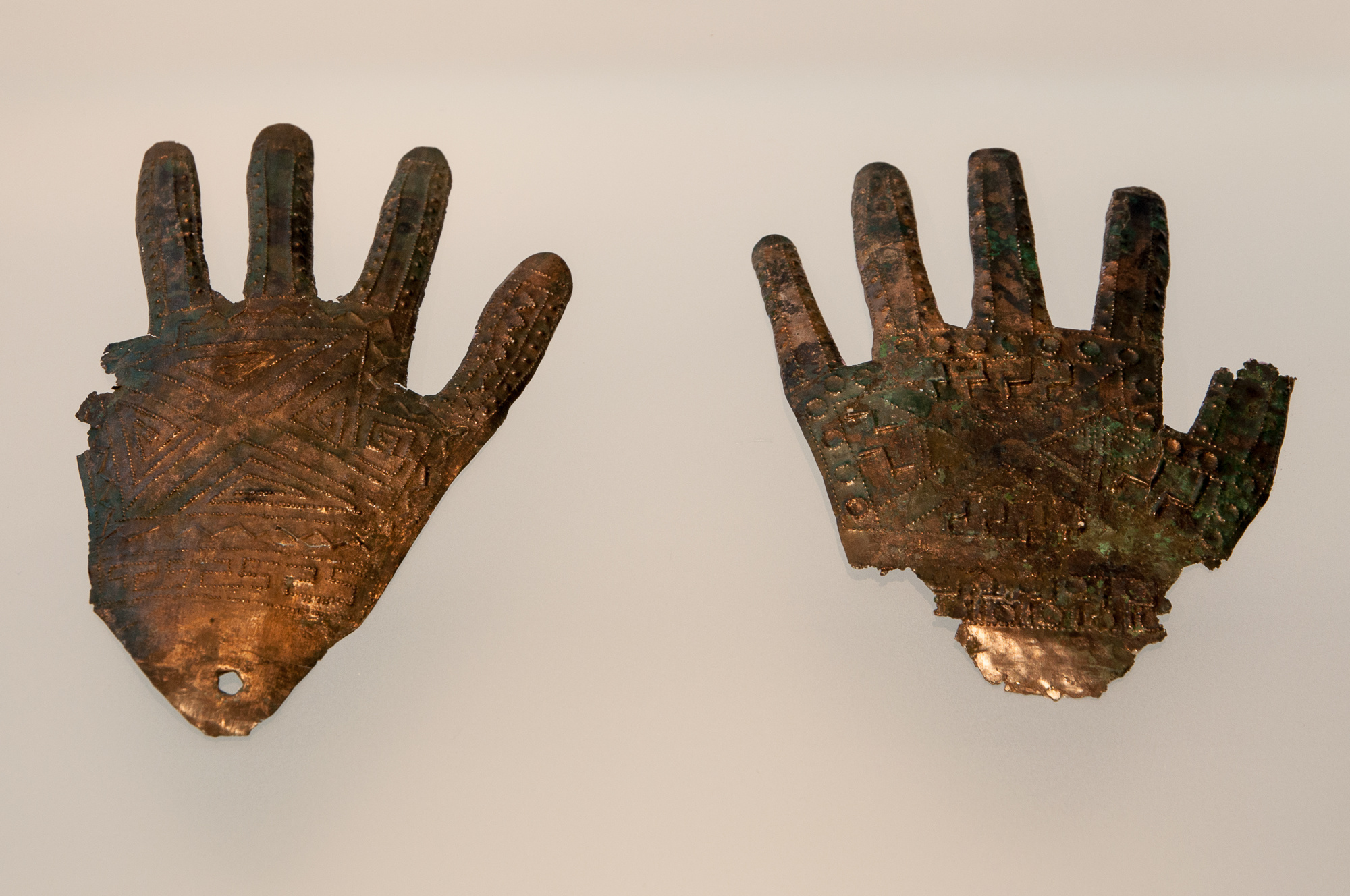
Bronze hands from Kleinklein

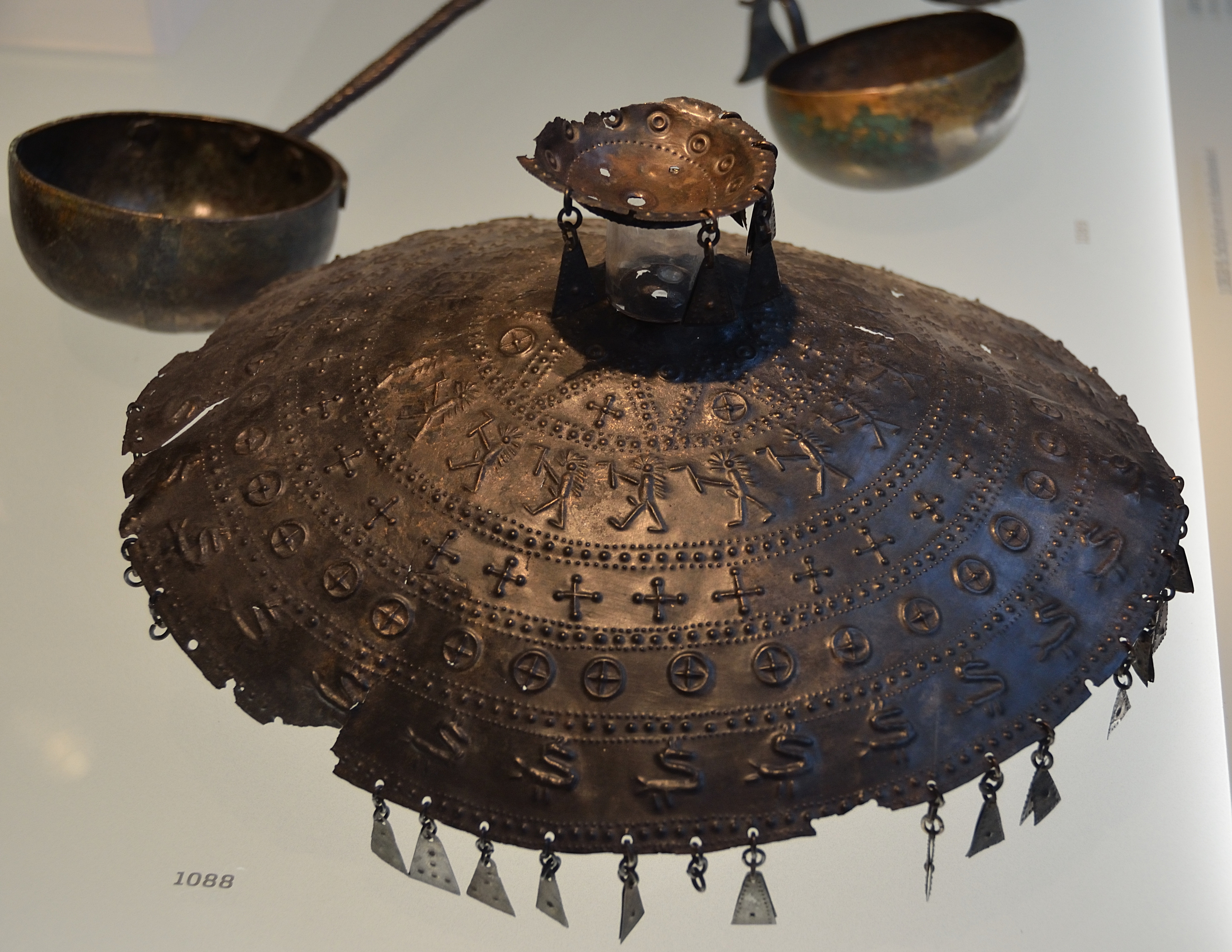
Pot lid from Kleinklein

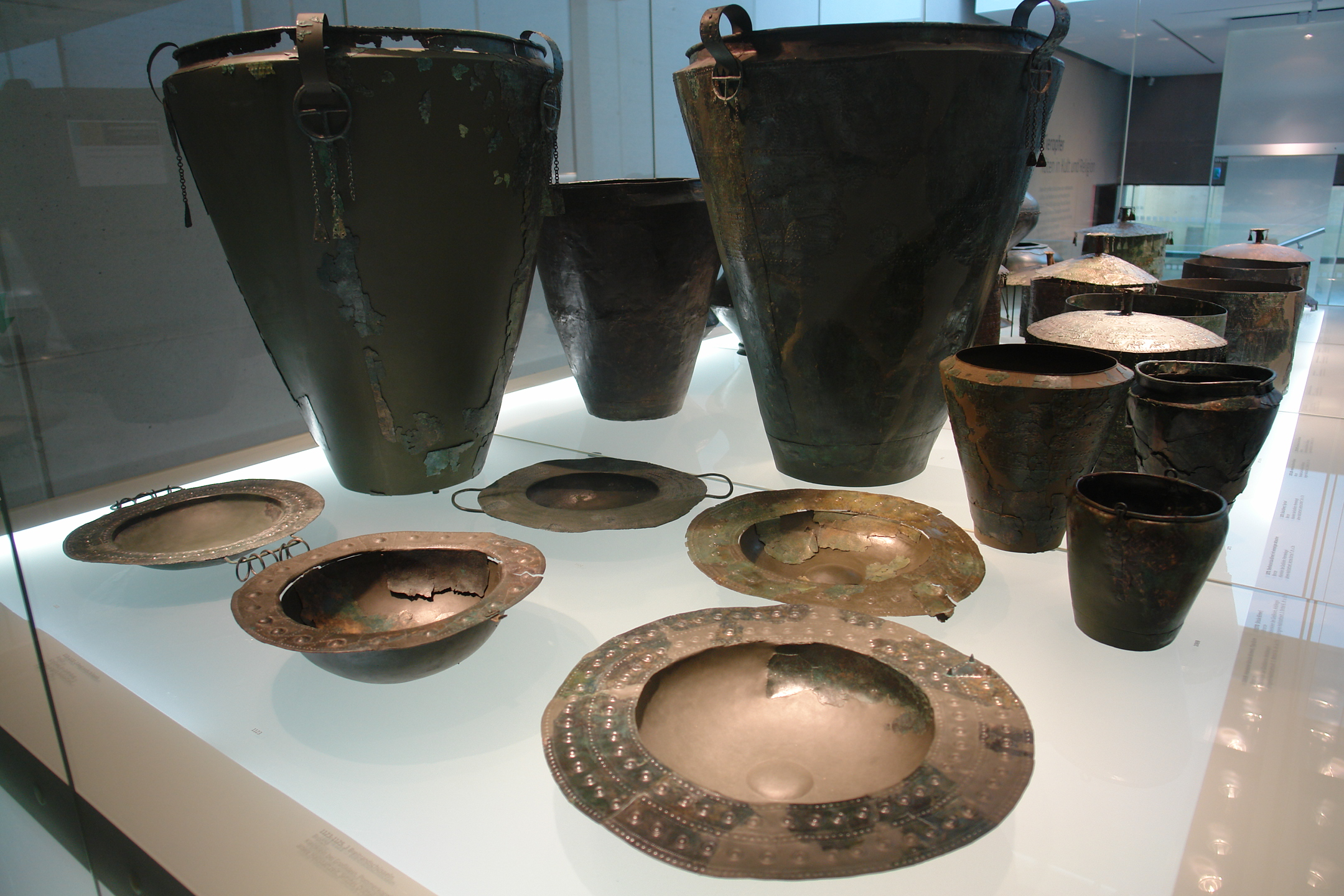

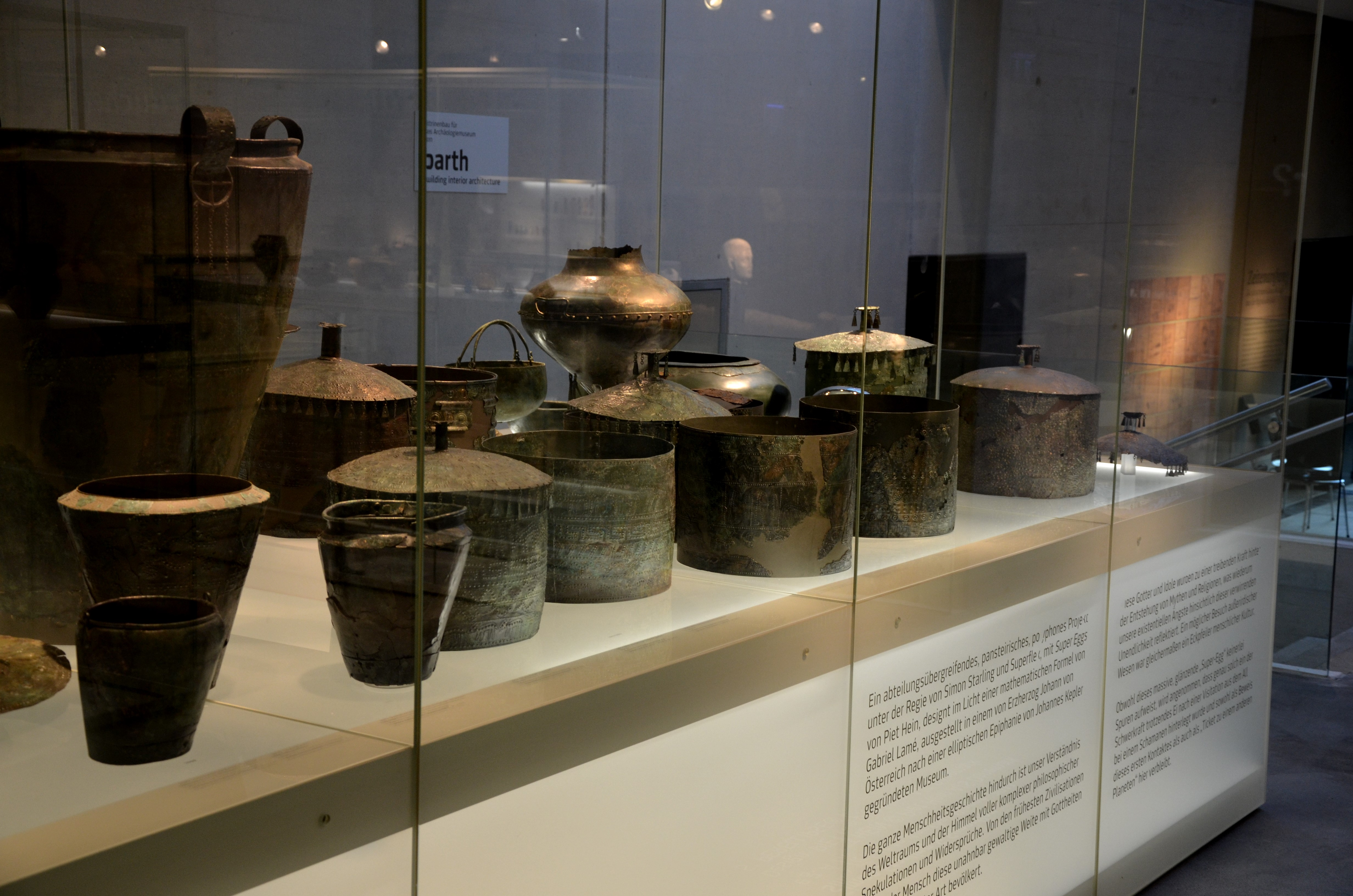

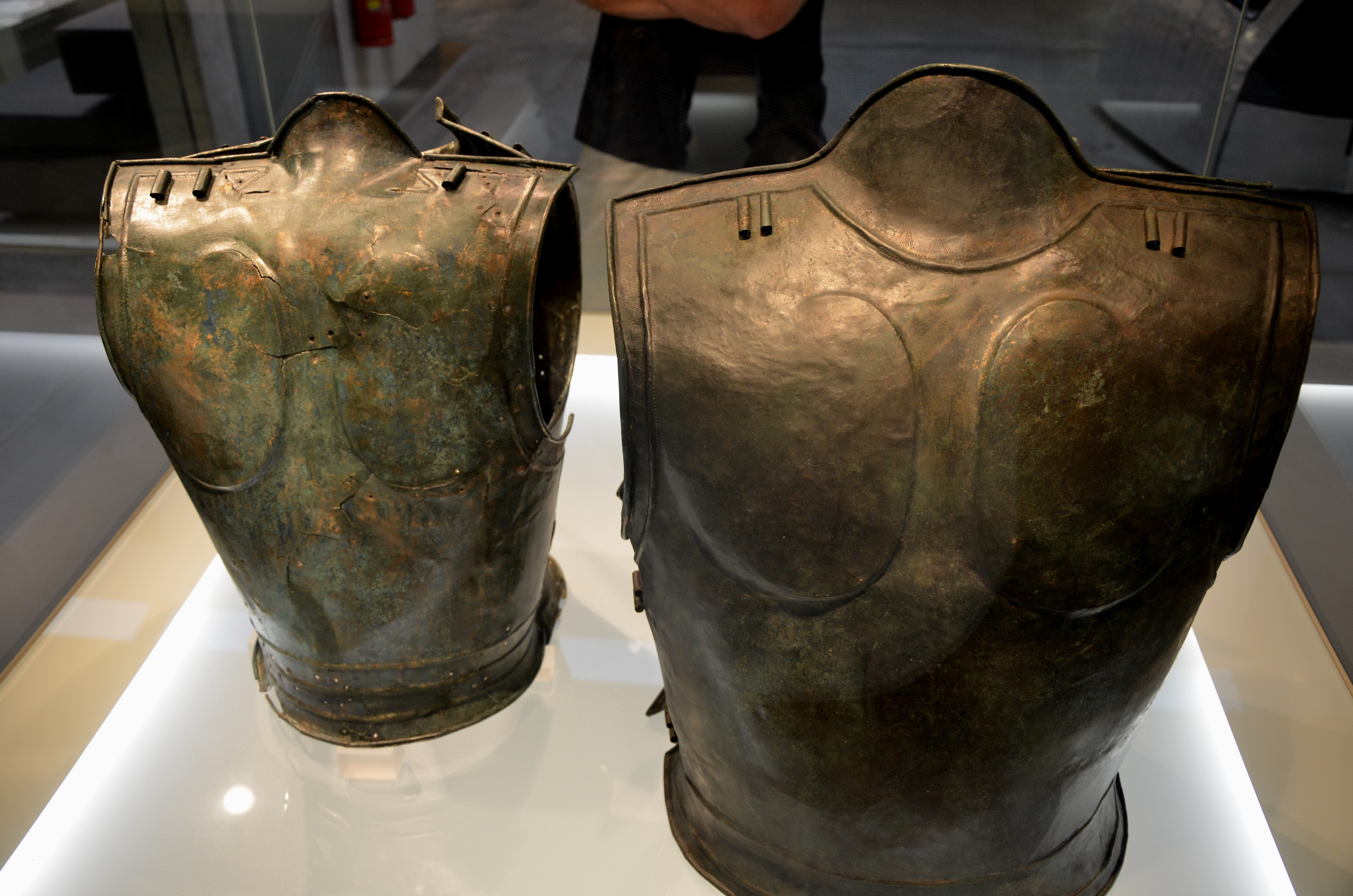

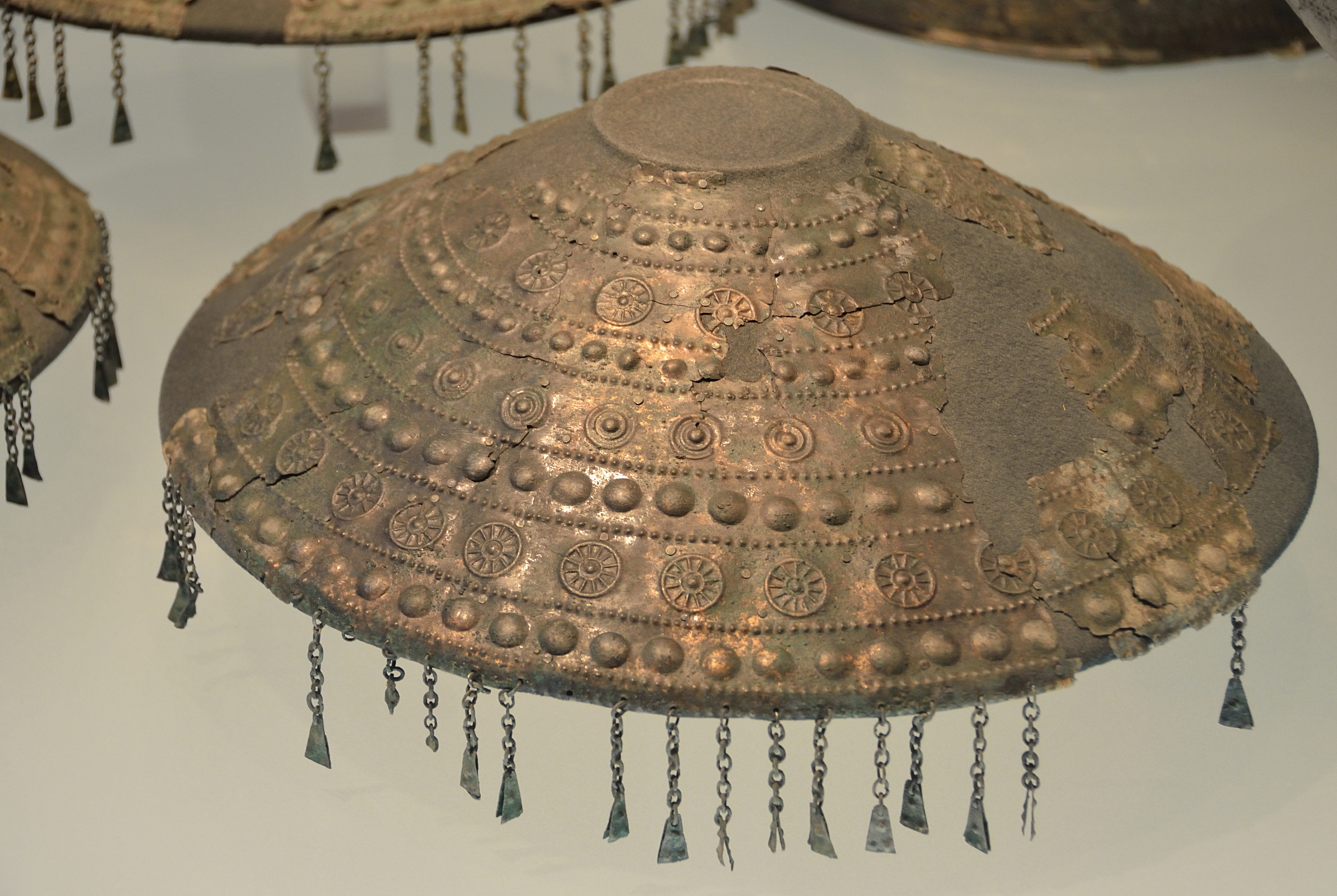

== See also ==
- Hochdorf Chieftain's Grave
- Vix Grave
- Heuneburg
- Glauberg
- Hohenasperg
- Ipf
- Alte Burg
- La Tène culture
