= Kitzeck im Sausal =

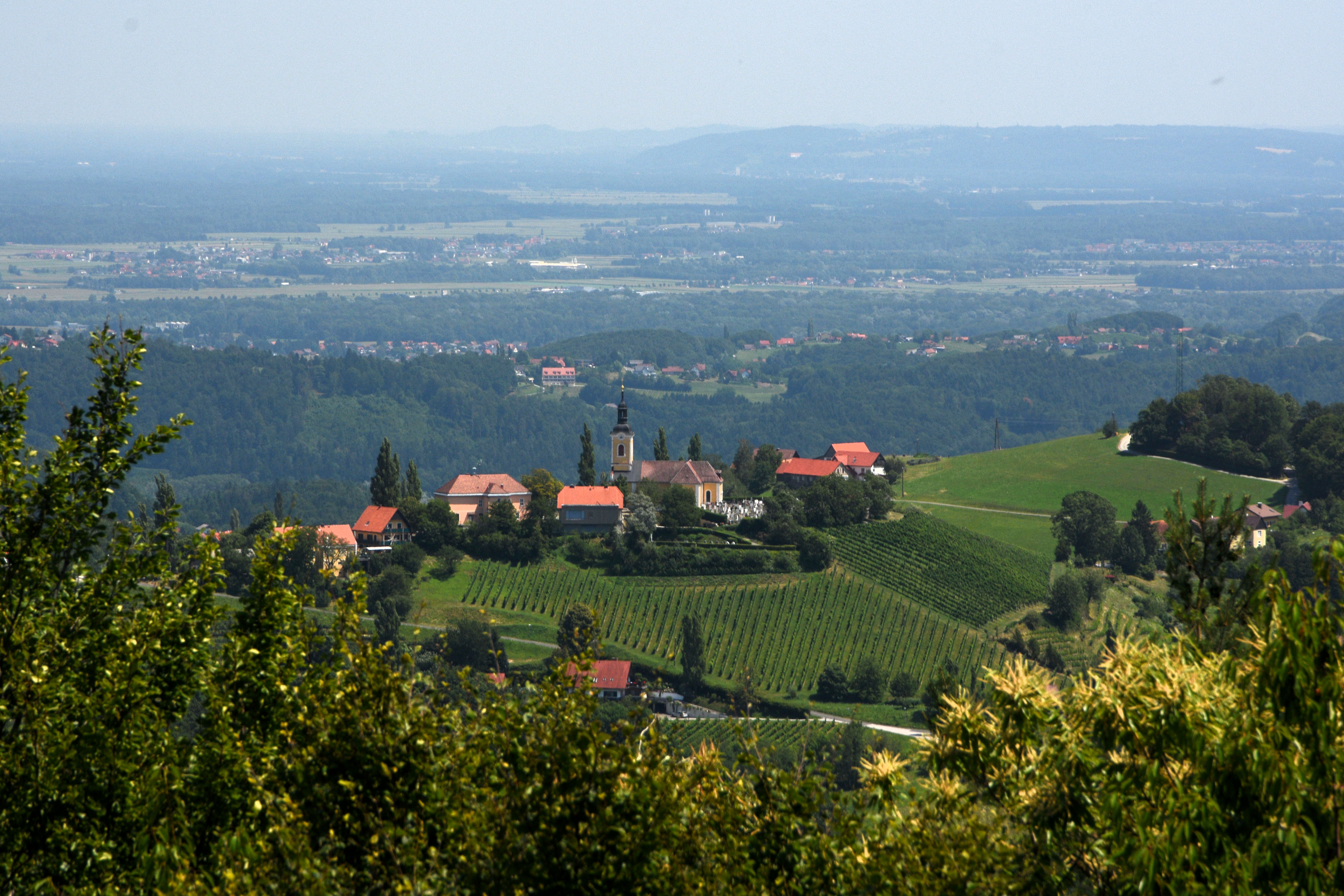

- Coat of arms

- Location within Austria
- Coordinates: 46°47′10″N 15°27′0″E
- Country: Austria
- State: Styria
- District: Leibnitz

Government
  - Mayor: Josef Fischer (ÖVP)

Area
  - Total: 16.29 km^{2} (6.29 sq mi)
- Elevation: 564 m (1,850 ft)

Population (2018-01-01)
  - Total: 1,228
  - Density: 75.38/km^{2} (195.2/sq mi)
- Time zone: UTC+1 (CET)
  - Summer (DST): UTC+2 (CEST)
- Postal code: A-8442, A-8441, A-8451
- Area code: +43 3456
- Website: www.kitzeck-sausal.at

Kitzeck im Sausal (Austrian German: [kɪˈtsɛk ɪm ˈsaʊsal]) is the central town in the Sausal mountain range in Southern Styria, Austria. It is the highest-altitude wine-growing community in Austria.

== Geography ==
Kitzeck im Sausal lies between the Koralpe in the west, the Little Hungarian Plain in the east, the mountains of Upper Styria in the north and the mountain ridges of Slovenia in the south. The area of the municipality is 1,629 ha.

== Tourism ==
Kitzeck is home to the first wine museum that was established in Styria (1979). Besides Wine culture, tourism has become a pillar of the local economy and obviously both are pursued on close combination.

== Church ==
The local church, dedicated to Our Lady of Sorrows, was built between 1640 and 1644. The funds were donated by a citizen of the nearby city, Leibnitz.
