= Pistorf =

- Former municipality
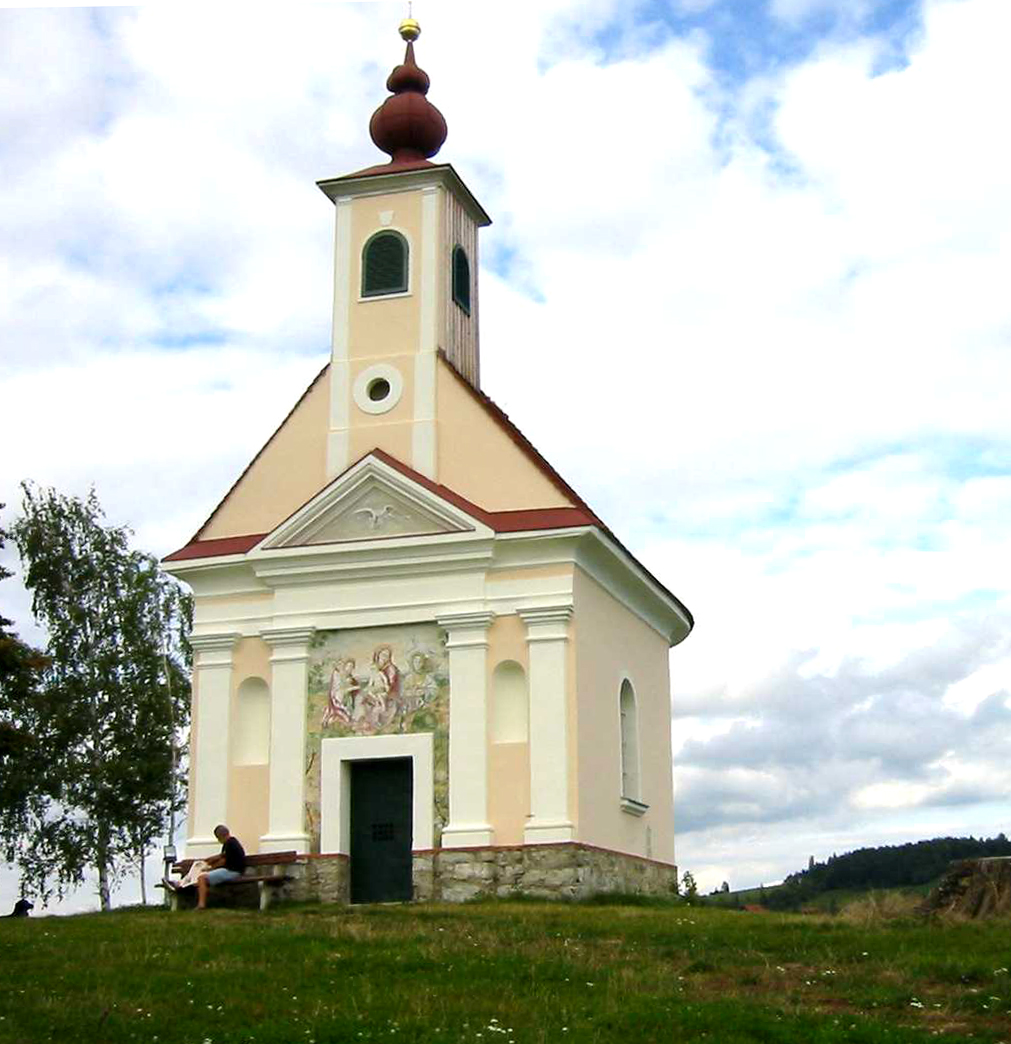
- Chapel in Pistorf

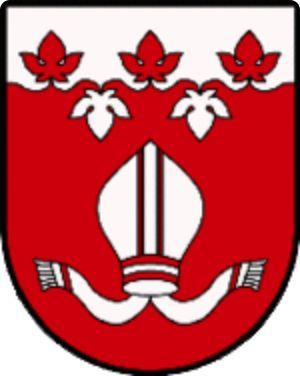
- Coat of arms

- Location within Austria
- Coordinates: 46°46′12″N 15°22′12″E
- Country: Austria
- State: Styria
- District: Leibnitz

Area
  - Total: 13.57 km^{2} (5.24 sq mi)
- Elevation: 312 m (1,024 ft)

Population (1 January 2016)
  - Total: 1,402
  - Density: 103.3/km^{2} (267.6/sq mi)
- Time zone: UTC+1 (CET)
  - Summer (DST): UTC+2 (CEST)
- Postal code: 8443
- Area code: 03457
- Vehicle registration: LB
- Website: www.pistorf.steiermark.at

Pistorf is a former municipality in the district of Leibnitz in Styria, Austria. Since the 2015 Styria municipal structural reform, it is part of the municipality Gleinstätten.
