= Sausal =

Coordinates: 46°47′N 15°27′E

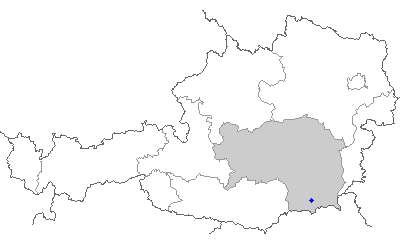

The Sausal (Austrian German pronunciation: [ˈzaʊzal]) is a small mountain range in the southwestern parts of Austria's state Styria. It thrusts up from the northern banks of the Sulm valley, west of the district town of Leibnitz. Its highest point, the summit of the Demmerkogel, rises 671 m above the level of the Adriatic Sea. Large parts of the Sausal have a mediterranean-type microclimate. Together with the rich soil this is the basis of its extensive vineyards, which are the cornerstone of the local economy. Tourism flourishes as well.

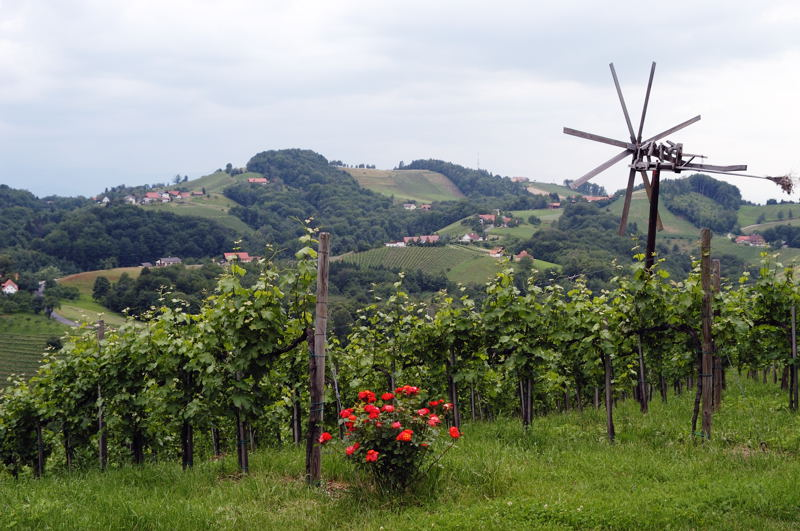
A typical landscape in the South Styrian Sausal mountain range, with a Klapotez

== History ==
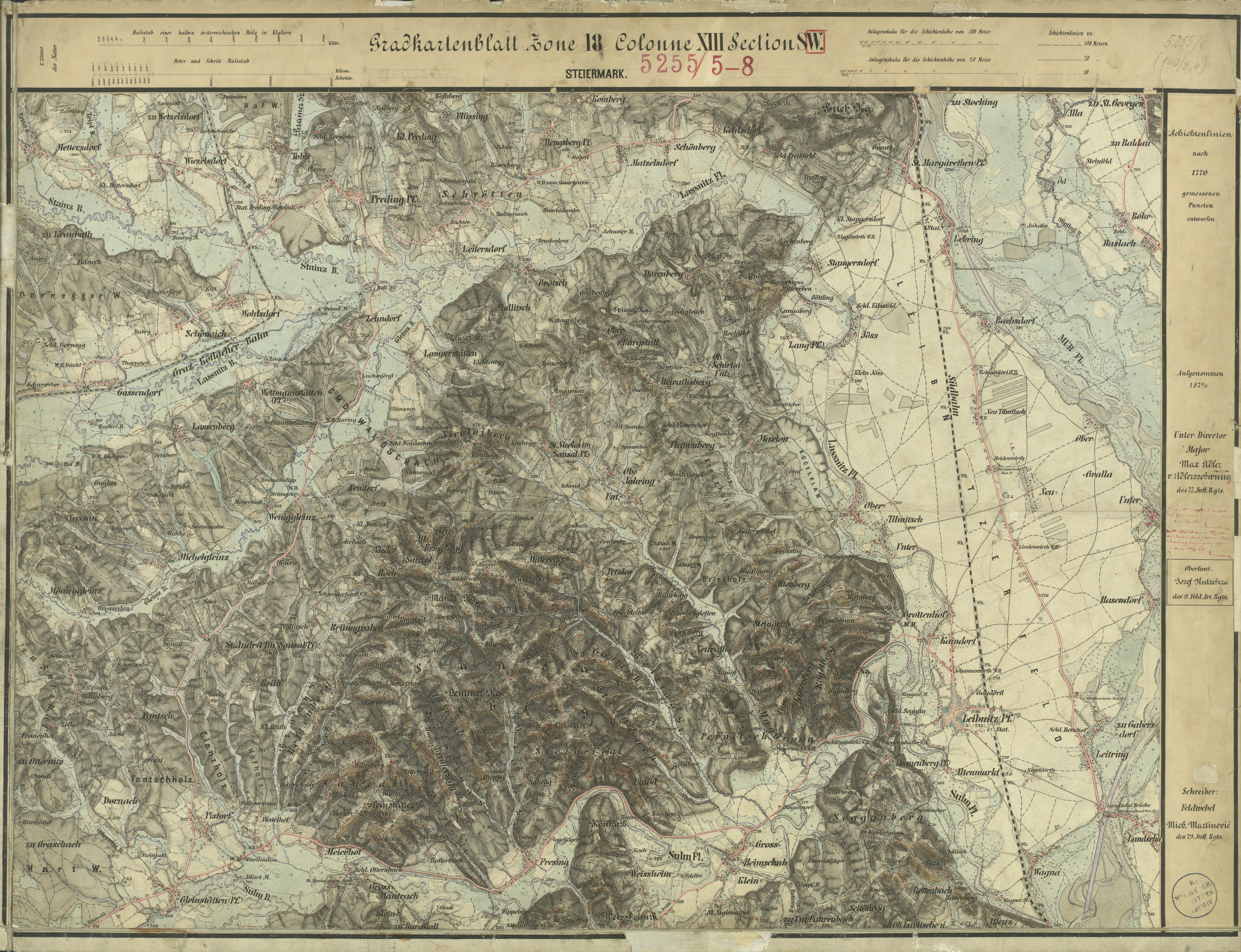
A map of the Sausal mountain range and the upper Sulm valley, 1879

Although the privileged climatic situation would have suggested early human habitation in the Sausal mountain range, archeological finds were spurious until late 2004 when preparatory work for a new vineyard on a terrace at the Spiegelkogel mountain near St. Nikolai im Sausal uncovered the remains of an urnfield culture village, and much better preserved late Neolithic construction traces below it. Archaeologists now associate this older Copper Age settlement with the Lasinja culture.

The name Sausal first appeared as Susil in 970, when emperor Otto I assigned a strip of territory between the Sulm and the Laßnitz rivers to the Archbishop of Salzburg. This is supposed to be derived from Latin (silva Solva, i.e., the "forest at the Sulm river"). During these early medieval times the steep hills were completely forested, awash with deer and boar, and ideal for hunting.

The Bavarian immigrants colonizing the area had found the mountain range almost uninhabited, as it perhaps had been throughout Roman times, only with small Slavic settlements scattered in its larger valleys. They immediately began to convert much of the dense forests to cultured land, and started to grow wine. By the 12th century, peasants routinely paid large parts of their taxes in various viniculture products. Salzburg nobility founded a number of estates (some of which exist even today) to exert some control over the wildlife and the hunting operations.

== Local culture and economy ==
Forestry, hunting and wine culture essentially defined local life for the following centuries. This continued after 1595 when Salzburg's archbishop Wolf Dietrich gave the town of Leibnitz and the eastern part of the Sausal mountain range to the bishop of Seckau. Wine culture peaked in the 17th century and slowly retreated until the late 20th century. Today, only the municipalities of Kitzeck and St. Andrä-Höch rely mainly on wine. Most recently however, several new vineyards have been planted on the southern and western slopes of the Sausal.

A local peculiarity (though also found in other wine-growing areas of the region) is the Klapotez, a traditional wooden contraption which remotely resembles a windmill from the North American plains, and is intended to scare birds away.

The local microclimate, with winter frosts relatively rare and mild, allows figs and sometimes even kiwifruit to ripen in particularly protected places. The sweet chestnut, a warmth-adapted tree, grows abundantly in the wild.

Recently, the hillsides have become an attractive residential area for the more affluent strata of society in Styria's southern parts. Weekend domiciles also proliferate, not always in perfect harmony with the landscape.

== Saint Theresa's Chapel ==
The Theresienkapelle, a large chapel built in 1834 and named after St. Teresa of Ávila (although it is dedicated to the Virgin Mary) is located on one of the most prominent summits in the steeper Southern part the Sausal mountain range. From its exposed site it offers an impressive panoramic view across the upper Sulm valley. On occasion of its total refurbishment in 2002 the chapel was adorned with a fresco by Franziska Ceski von Ferrari depicting Virgin Mary as the mother of Jesus sitting in a vineyard, with St. Catherine of Siena to her right and St. Thérèse of Lisieux to her left.

== Villages in the Sausal mountains ==
The wine-growing village Kitzeck, which is situated high upon the hills, is a popular tourist site. Other notable places include:

- St. Nikolai im Sausal
- Sankt Andrä im Sausal
