= Hirschberg (surname) =

Hirschberg is a German surname of topographic and habitational origin, derived from the Middle High German elements hirz ("deer") and berc ("mountain"), for example in Thuringia.

Notable people with the name include:

- Aleksander Hirschberg (1847–1907), Polish historian
- Alice Hirschberg (1856–1913), English painter
- Angelica Lindén Hirschberg, Swedish obstetrician and gynecologist
- Bill Hirschberg (1881–1963), Australia international rugby union player
- Bryce Hirschberg (born 1990), American film director
- Dan Hirschberg, American computer scientist
- Eugenie Hirschberg-Pucher (1862–1937), Baltic German writer
- Jens Hirschberg (born 1964), East German long jumper
- Julia Hirschberg, American computer scientist
- Julius Hirschberg (1843–1925), German ophthalmologist
- Lora Hirschberg (born 1963), American sound engineer
- Lynn Hirschberg, American journalist
- Max Hirschberg (1883–1964), German lawyer and legal scholar
- Michael H. Hirschberg (1847–1929), American judge
- Nell Hirschberg (1907–1988), American microbiologist

== See also ==
- Hirschberg (disambiguation)
- Hirshberg, an Americanized spelling variant
- Hershberg / Herschberg. Hersch is a common Yiddish version of the German Hirsch.
- Harshbarger, an Americanized form of the closely related surname Hirschberger
