= Pucher =

Pucher is the surname of the following notable people:

- Johann Pucher (1814–1864), Slovene priest, scientist and photographer
- Peter Pucher (born 1974), Slovak ice hockey forward
- René Pucher (born 1970), Slovak ice hockey player
- Solomon Pucher (1829–1899), rabbi
- Thomas Pucher (born 1969), Austrian architect

== See also ==
- Bucher
