= Richard Knabl =

Richard Knabl (24 October 1789, in Graz, Styria – 19 June 1874) was an Austrian parish priest and epigraphist who, though he lacked formal academic training as a historian, became a prominent contributor to our current knowledge of the Roman period in Noricum and western Pannonia, especially on the territory of modern Styria.

== Youth and parish priest ==
Knabl was a son of the syndic Ambros Knabl, who had been mayor of Styria's capital Graz from 1784 to 1788. He attended school and studied theology in his home town, was ordained as a Roman Catholic priest in 1811, and spent the following years as a chaplain and parish priest at various places in Styria. In 1838 he was assigned to parishes in what was then the immediate vicinity of Graz, first to Karlau and then to St. Andrä.

== Epigraphist and historian ==
Only at this time, already at an age of 49 years, Knabl began to devote himself to epigraphy and numismatics. Inspired by the large collection of Roman artifacts on display at the Joanneum (the largest museum in Graz) and at the castle of Seggau, he embarked on private investigations which in 1845 led to his discovery that the archeological finds near Leibnitz marked the site of the Roman town Flavia Solva. His first major paper, published in 1848, presented such convincing epigraphic proof to this effect that the predominant academic opinion which had tentatively located Flavia Solva in the Zollfeld in Carinthia (actually the site of Virunum), quickly accepted it.

From this time onward Knabl published significant findings from his research on an almost yearly basis, earning himself a reputation as one of his period's most important investigative historians of Roman times in the eastern Alpine region. Among other things, he was particularly interested in Roman traffic routes. He investigated the Roman road that had connected Claudia Celeia (now Celje) and Poetovio (now Ptuj) and also the transalpine road from Virunum to Ovilava (now Wels), frequently combining epigraphy and numismatics with additional sources such as the Tabula Peutingeriana. However, the central project of his life - a codex of all epigraphic finds from antiquity made in the area encompassing today's Austrian province of Styria and northern Slovenia, documenting about 600 inscriptions at 183 sites on its 728 pages - remained unpublished; the manuscript is kept at the University of Graz.

== Reception by academic historians ==
Knabl's painstaking work, sustained over three decades and always adhering to the scientific standards of his time, earned him acceptance among accomplished historians such as Alfred von Arneth and Theodor Mommsen who in their official statements spoke highly of him. However, when they expressed their opinions in private, academic arrogance sometimes showed. For example, Mommsen (then a 40-year-old assistant professor in Berlin) wrote in a letter to a friend dated 8 September 1857:

"Number One among the sages in Graz is the priest Knabl, an aged type of 65 who has applied himself to the stones in his late years. If he learns of a Roman stone somewhere in Styria he will instantly travel there with comical enthusiasm, and will then lie there reading for two or three days; with a strong pretense at scholarship, but with even stronger respect shown towards myself whom he eagerly kisses the hands, collecting fragments for my biography. (...) However, his hobby is indeed useful and he has advanced historical knowledge by a good bit, although he did it more with his short legs than with his thick head..."

== Honors ==
In 1861 the University of Graz honored Knabl with a doctorate. The Austrian emperor awarded him the Golden Service Medal in 1862 and the Austrian Medal for Science in 1864, and named him Imperial Counsellor in 1868. Knabl reciprocated by donating his numismatic collection to the University of Graz in 1867, followed by his remaining antiquities on 15 April 1868. When Knabl died in 1874, aged 85 years, the university collected his library of 1,456 volumes as per his testament.
