= Quintinia gens =

Plebeian family of ancient Rome

The gens Quintinia was an obscure plebeian family at ancient Rome. No members of this gens are mentioned by Roman writers, but a number are known from the epigraphy of imperial times.

== Origin ==
The nomen Quintinius belongs to a class of gentilicia formed from cognomina ending in -inus. The surname Quintinus forms part of a group of names derived from other names, such as the common praenomen Quintus, or the nomen Quinctius.

== Praenomina ==
Only a few of the inscriptions of the Quintinii include praenomina. Most of these were common names, including Gaius, Lucius, Quintus, and Sextus. There is also an instance of Tiberius, which was somewhat less common.

== Members ==
This list includes abbreviated praenomina. For an explanation of this practice, see filiation.

- Tiberius Quintinius Larnutinus, sent to investigate a lake in the unsettled regions south of Africa Proconsularis, according to an inscription dating between the first and third centuries AD.
- Sextus Quintinius Secundus, the heir of Publius Aelius Mercurialis, for whom dedicated a tomb at Lugdunum in Gallia Lugdunensis, dating from the first half of the second century.
- Quintinia Callistes, a woman buried at Signia in Latium, in a second-century tomb built by her husband of about twenty years, Titus Crustidius Priscus.
- Quintinia Magnilla, a woman buried at Ulpia Traiana Sarmizegetusa in Dacia, aged thirty, in a tomb dedicated by her husband, Antonius Rufus, one of the municipal duumvirs, and her sons, Antonius Priscus, Antonius Rufus, and Antonius Rufinus, dating from the latter half of the second century.
- Quintinia Sequnda, the mother of Carinius, a freedman who along with his wife, Papia, dedicated a tomb at the present site of Obernburg, formerly part of Germania Superior, dating from the latter half of the second century, for Quintinia, along with their son, Perpetuus Severus.
- Quintinia, named in an inscription from Mogontiacum in Germania Superior, dedicated by her freedman and heir, Quintinius Fruendus, and dating between the middle of the second century, and the early third.
- Quintinius Fruendus, a freedman, named in an inscription from Mogontiacum, dating between the middle of the second century and the early part of the third, dedicated to Quintinia, his former mistress and patron.
- Quintus Quintinius, named in an inscription from Bonna in Germania Inferior, dating between the middle of the second century and the middle of the third.
- Quintinius Quintianus, along with Quintinius Venustianus, dedicated a tomb for their father, dating between the middle of the second century and the middle of the third, at Arausio in Gallia Narbonensis.
- Quintinius Venustianus, along with Quintinius Quintianus, dedicated a tomb at Arausio for their father, dating between the middle of the second century and the middle of the third.
- Gaius Quintinius Victor, dedicated a tomb for his son, also named Gaius Quintinius Victor, at the site of modern Afumați, formerly part of Dacia, dating between the middle of the second century, and the middle of the third.
- Gaius Quintinius C. f. Victor, a boy buried at the present site of Afumați, aged eight, in a tomb built by his father, also named Gaius Quintinius Victor, dating between the middle of the second century, and the middle of the third.
- Quintinia Materna, dedicated a tomb at Colonia Claudia Ara Agrippinensium in Germania Inferior, dating between the late second century and the end of the third, for her son, Quintus Vetinius Verus, a member of the guild of beam makers, aged thirty-one years, seven months, twenty-six days.
- Quintinius Augustus, an optio in the Legio XXII Primigenia, buried at Lugdunum in a tomb dedicated by his wife, Juventia Clheuvia, dating from the first half of the third century.
- Quintinia, a woman buried in a third-century tomb at Poetovio in Pannonia Superior, aged sixty, in a tomb built by her husband, whose name has not been preserved.
- Quintinius Catullus, along with Quintinia Catulla, the children of Gaius Junius Provincialis and his wife, Crispina Finis, who built a family sepulchre at Flavia Solva in Noricum, dating from AD 211. Catullus was a soldier in the tenth urban cohort.
- Quintinius Primanus, one of the Treveri, was a veteran of the Legio XXX Ulpia Victrix, and was buried at Lugdunum in a tomb dedicated by his wife, Valeria Vera, dating from the reign of Severus Alexander.
- Quintinia Ursula, a woman buried at Rome, in a tomb built by her husband, Amulius Melior, dating between the end of the third century and the first quarter of the fourth.
- Quintinius, buried in a fourth-century tomb at Rome.

=== Undated Quintinii ===
- Quintinia L. l. Thymele, a freedwoman named in an inscription from Rome.

== See also ==
- List of Roman gentes

== Bibliography ==
- Theodor Mommsen et alii, Corpus Inscriptionum Latinarum (The Body of Latin Inscriptions, abbreviated CIL), Berlin-Brandenburgische Akademie der Wissenschaften (1853–present).
- René Cagnat et alii, L'Année épigraphique (The Year in Epigraphy, abbreviated AE), Presses Universitaires de France (1888–present).
- George Davis Chase, "The Origin of Roman Praenomina", in Harvard Studies in Classical Philology, vol. VIII, pp. 103–184 (1897).
- Inscriptiones Christianae Urbis Romae (Christian Inscriptions from the City of Rome, abbreviated ICUR), New Series, Rome (1922–present).
- Caesarodunum: Bulletin de l'Institut d'études latines de la Faculté des lettres et sciences humaines d'Orléans-Tours, Université de Tours (1967–present).
- Helmut Castritius, Manfred Clauss, and Leo Hefner, "Die römischen Steininschriften des Odenwaldes" (The Roman Stone Inscriptions of the Odenwalds, abbreviated RSO), in Beiträge zur Erforschung des Odenwaldes und seiner Randlandschaften No. 2, Breuberg–Neustadt (1977), pp. 237–308.
- Paolo and Maria Teresa Sblendorio Cugusi, Studi sui carmi epigrafici: Carmina Latina Epigraphica Pannonica (Studies of Epigraphic Poems: Latin Verse from Pannonian Epigraphy), Pàtron, Bologna (2007).
