= Hershberger =

Hershberger is a surname. Notable people with the surname include:

- Guy Hershberger (1896–1989), American Mennonite theologian, educator, historian and writer
- John Hershberger (born 1959), American computer scientist
- Mike Hershberger (1939–2012), American baseball player
- Natalie Hershberger (born 2004), American taekwondo practitioner and writer
- Pete Hershberger (born 1949), American politician
- Sally Hershberger (born 1961) American hair stylist
- Trisha Hershberger (born 1982) American YouTuber, vlogger, and television host
- Willard Hershberger (1910–1940), American baseball player

== See also ==
- Hershberger Mountain Lookout
- Hershberg
