= Hirshberg =

Hirshberg is a surname of German and Ashkenazi Jewish origin. It is primarily an Americanized spelling variant of the surname Hirschberg, which is of topographic and habitational origin, derived from the Middle High German elements hirz ("deer") and berc ("mountain").

Notable people with the surname include:

- Al Hirshberg (1909–1973), American sportswriter
- Charles Hirshberg, American journalist and sportswriter
- Edward Hirshberg (1908–1983), American football player and coach
- Gary Hirshberg (born 1954), American businessman
- Glen Hirshberg (born 1966), American author
- Jerry Hirshberg (1939–2019), American automotive designer
- Leonard Keene Hirshberg (1877–1969), American physician

== See also ==
- Hirschberg (disambiguation)
- Harshbarger, an Americanized form of the closely related surname Hirschberger
