= Hirschberg =

Hirschberg may refer to:

== Places ==
- Hirschberg, Rhineland-Palatinate, a municipality in the district of Rhein-Lahn, Rhineland-Palatinate, Germany
- Hirschberg, Thuringia, a town in the district of Saale-Orla-Kreis, Thuringia, Germany
- Hirschberg an der Bergstraße, a town in the district of Rhein-Neckar, Baden-Württemberg, Germany
- Hirschberg, a former municipality in Switzerland, now incorporated into Oberegg District in the canton of Appenzell Innerrhoden
- Hirschberg, a part of town of Warstein in the district of Soest, North Rhine-Westphalia, Germany
- Hirschberg (Bad Hirschberg), German name for Doksy, a town on the shores of lake Máchovo jezero
- Hirschberg Castle (Haarsee), Weilheim in Oberbayern, Bavaria, Germany
- Hirschberger Großteich, German name for Lake Mácha, an artificial lake in the Liberec Region, Czech Republic
- Hirschberg im Riesengebirge, the historic German name for Jelenia Góra, a city in Lower Silesia, south-western Poland

== Mountains and hills ==
- Hirschberg (Bavaria), a mountain in the Bavarian Fore-alps south of Lake Tegernsee, Bavaria, Germany
- Hirschberg, the highest hill in the Kaufunger Wald, central Germany

== People ==
- Hirschberg (surname), a list of people with the surname

== Other uses ==
- Hirschberg test, a medical screening test for an eye condition
- Hirschberg's algorithm, a dynamic computer programming algorithm

== See also ==
- Hirshberg, a surname
