= Leibnitz =

- Municipality
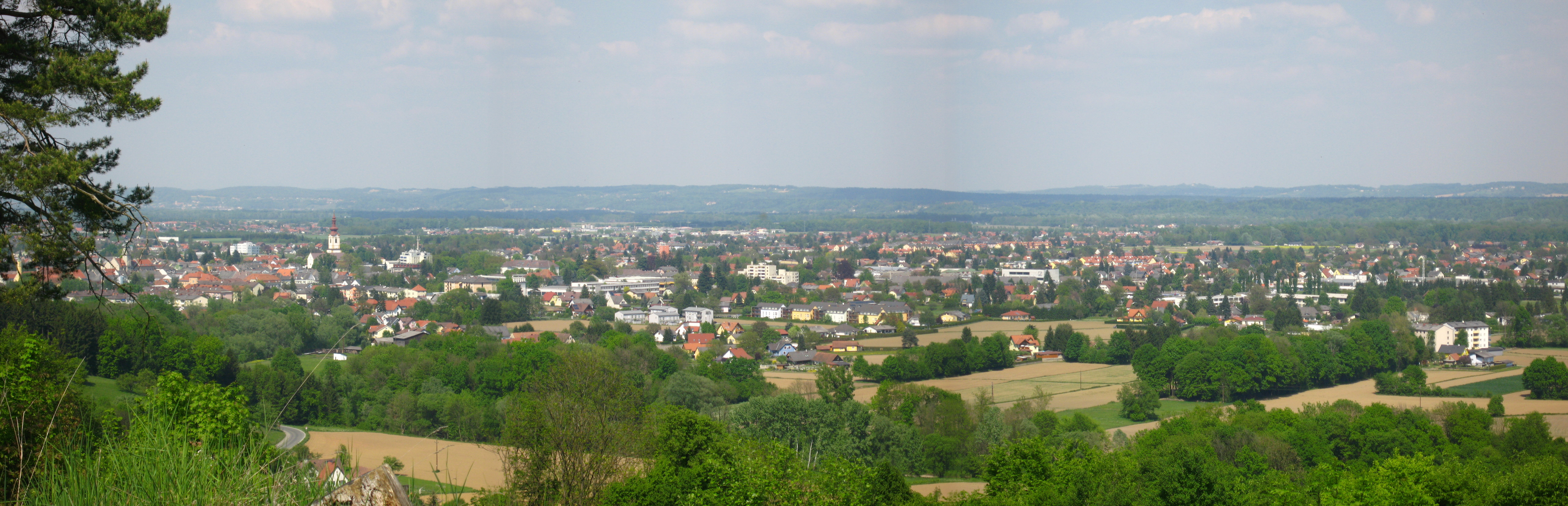

- Coat of arms

- Location within Austria Location within Styria
- Coordinates: 46°46′59″N 15°32′42″E
- Country: Austria
- State: Styria
- District: Leibnitz

Government
  - Mayor: Michael Schuhmacher (SPÖ)

Area
  - Total: 23.52 km^{2} (9.08 sq mi)
- Elevation: 275 m (902 ft)

Population (2018-01-01)
  - Total: 12,201
  - Density: 518.8/km^{2} (1,344/sq mi)
- Time zone: UTC+1 (CET)
  - Summer (DST): UTC+2 (CEST)
- Postal code: 8430, 8435, 8451, 8462
- Area code: +43 3452
- Vehicle registration: LB
- Website: www.leibnitz.at

Leibnitz (Austrian German: [ˈlaɪbnɪts]; Slovene: Lipnica) is a city in the Austrian state of Styria and on 1 Jan. 2023 had a population of 13,014. It is located to the south of the city of Graz, between the Mur and Sulm rivers.

The town is the capital of the Leibnitz political district, which covers about 727 km^{2}, within which more than 80,000 people live. Leibnitz acts as a cultural, educational, judicial and economic focus for the surrounding district.

== History ==
Although the center of the current town is only about 3 km away from the archaeological site of Flavia Solva, Leibnitz cannot claim direct successorship to this Roman municipium founded in the 1st century, and finally destroyed in the early 5th century. When Bavarian settlers moved into the area during the 9th century, superseding and gradually absorbing the Slavic population that had established itself during the previous half-millennium, all recollection of the Roman city had long since faded.

The first documented version of the name Leibnitz reads Lipnizza and can be found in a scroll issued by emperor Otto the Great dated 7 March 970. However, a different settlement – the civitas Zuib (or Sulb; both names recall the Roman Solva) – was actually closer to the site of the present town than the civitas Lipnizza which was located on the nearby Frauenberg hill, where human occupation had persisted since the Neolithic age. Later, when the civilian settlement moved back and down to the Mur valley while the dwelling on the hill remained a fortified place, the name was transformed to Libniz and Libenizze (12th century), Leibentz and Leybencz (13th and 14th century), and finally Leybnitz (14th and 15th century).

During the 12th century the settlement and its surrounding area, including the Sulm valley to the west, became territories of the Archbishopric of Salzburg and remained so for more than 400 years. The relocation of the civilian settlement was initiated (or at least heavily supported) by Archbishop Konradin of Salzburg, probably by 1130. In March 1170, Emperor Barbarossa discussed matters associated with Salzburg's authority in Leibnitz, and an imperial document dated 14 June 1178 granted full jurisdiction to Salzburg.

The transition decades from the Middle Ages proved extremely turbulent and destructive to the area around Leibnitz, as it was to all the south-east parts of modern Austria. The fact that Leibnitz was not fortified certainly contributed to the decision of Archbishop Bernhard von Rorer in 1479 to hand the township over to the invading Hungarians; their occupation collapsed in 1490 and Austria quickly reclaimed Leibnitz, severely punishing those leading citizens who had collaborated with the Hungarians.

In the 18th and early 19th century, when Leibnitz had about 1,000 occupants, the town burned to the ground twice, on 29 May 1709 and again on 8–9 September 1829. By 1883 the population had risen to 2,471 and on 27 April 1913 Austro-Hungarian emperor Franz Josef I of Austria formally elevated Leibnitz to city rank.

By 1 January 1968 the population of Leibnitz had reached 6,641 but its relative importance and vitality had severely declined since Lower Styria had fallen to Yugoslavia in 1919 as a consequence of World War I, severing the city's vital connections to the south and effectively making it all but a "dead-border township." From the 1970s onward, when it became easier for Yugoslav citizens to travel to Austria, Leibnitz started to experience a marked economic reinvigoration which gained momentum with the establishment of Slovenia as an independent state in 1991, and its entry into the European Union in 2004.

== Local council ==
The elections in 2020 showed the following results:

- 18 seats SPÖ
- 6 seats ÖVP
- 3 seats The Greens - The Green Alternative
- 2 seats FPÖ
- 2 seat Bürgerforum Leibnitz

== Main sights ==
- The ruins of the Roman settlement of Flavia Solva near the village Wagna
- Schloss Seggau, a castle situated above the town on the Seggauberg. Founded in the 12th century by Archbishop Konrad I of Salzburg, it now accommodates a conference center
- The church on the Frauenberg on the hill (381 m) of the same name
- Leibnitz Abbey

== Culture and recreation ==
Leibnitz has a cinema, an ice rink located in the center, and an open-air swimming pool with campsite and tennis courts. These facilities are enjoyed both by locals and passing tourist traffic on its way to the Adriatic.

Interesting annual events include a fall festival with harvest thanksgiving procession, Leibnitz "wine week" and a "Perchtenlauf".

The vineyard-rich hilly countryside is home to many traditional wine-drinking establishments known as "Buschenschenke", where the local produce can be readily tasted.

The area is also crisscrossed by cycle trails, which are particularly popular in summer and fall. Leibnitz is situated on a branch of the cycle track which runs alongside the Mur river from Graz to the Slovenian border. Another cycle track alongside the river Sulm leads to Gleinstätten.

== Gallery ==
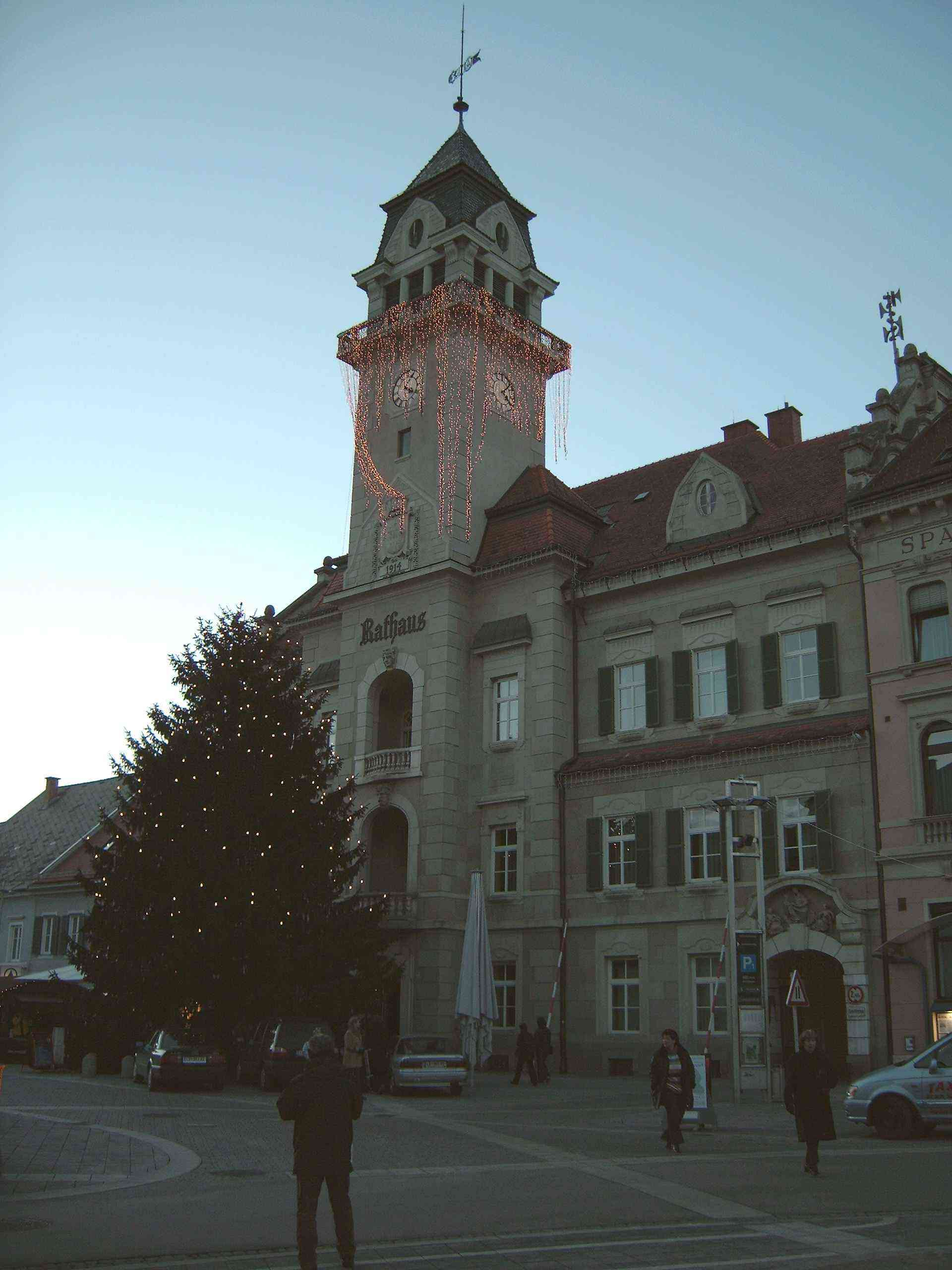
Town Hall

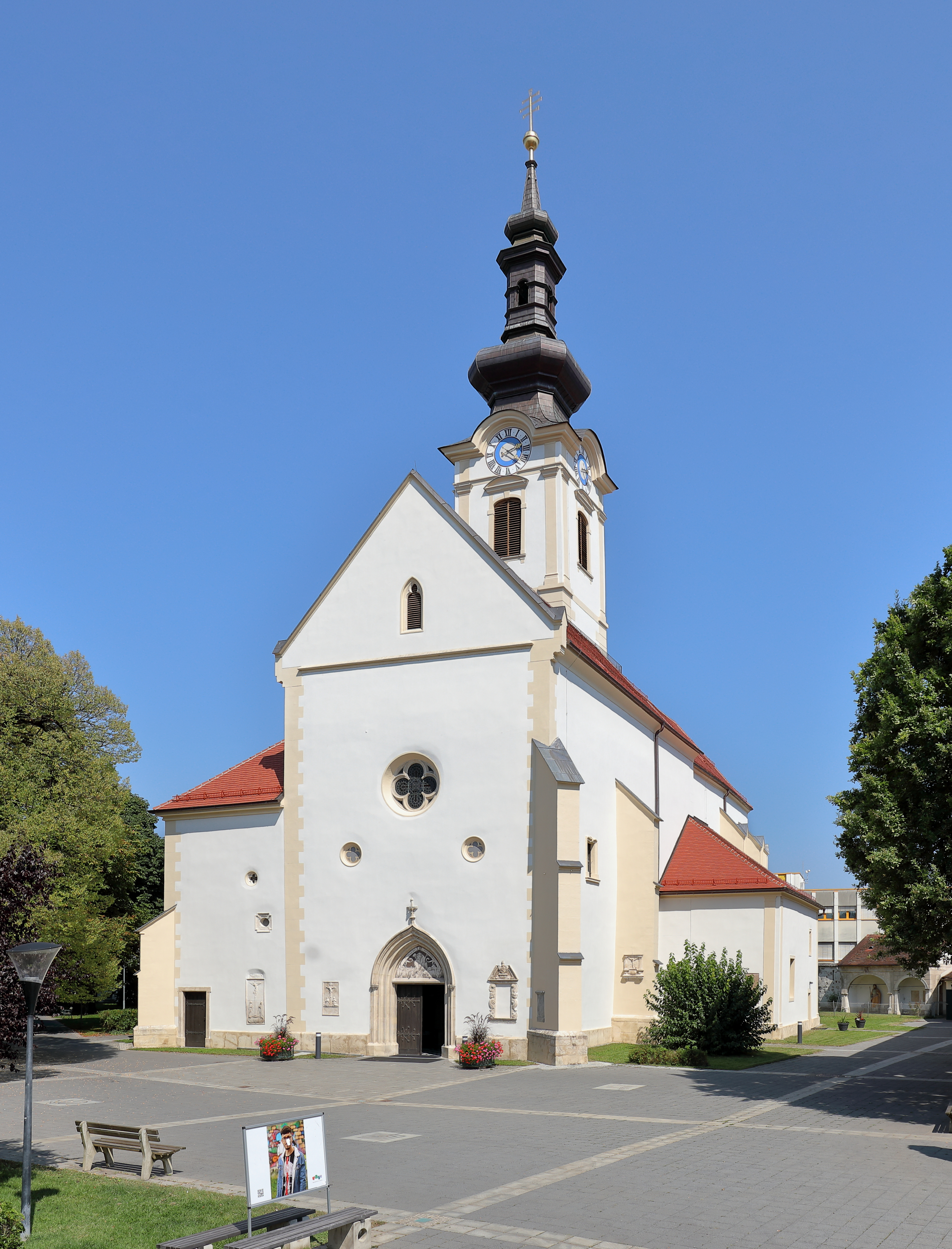
Catholic church of
Saint James

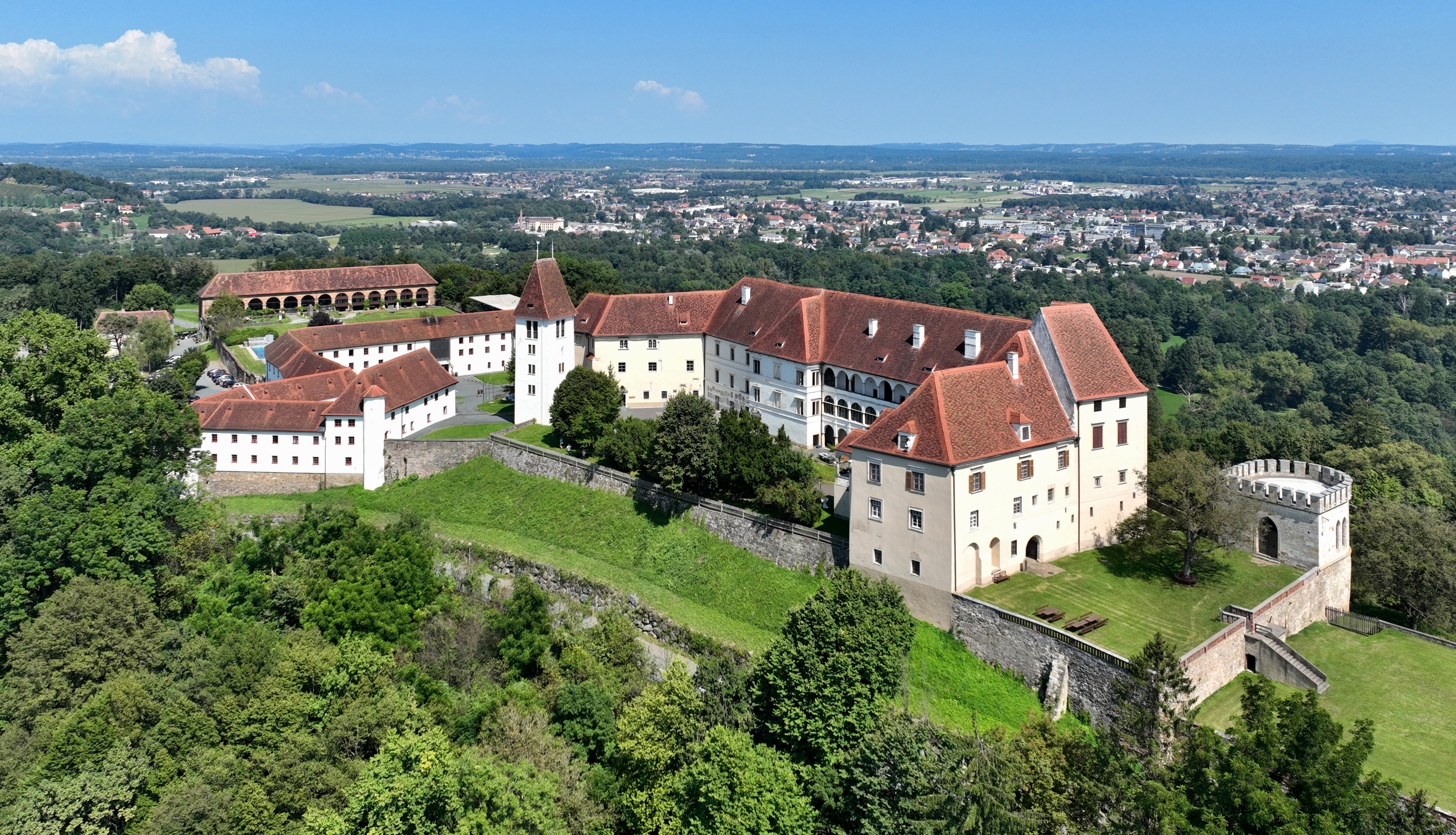
Seggau Castle
(near Leibnitz)

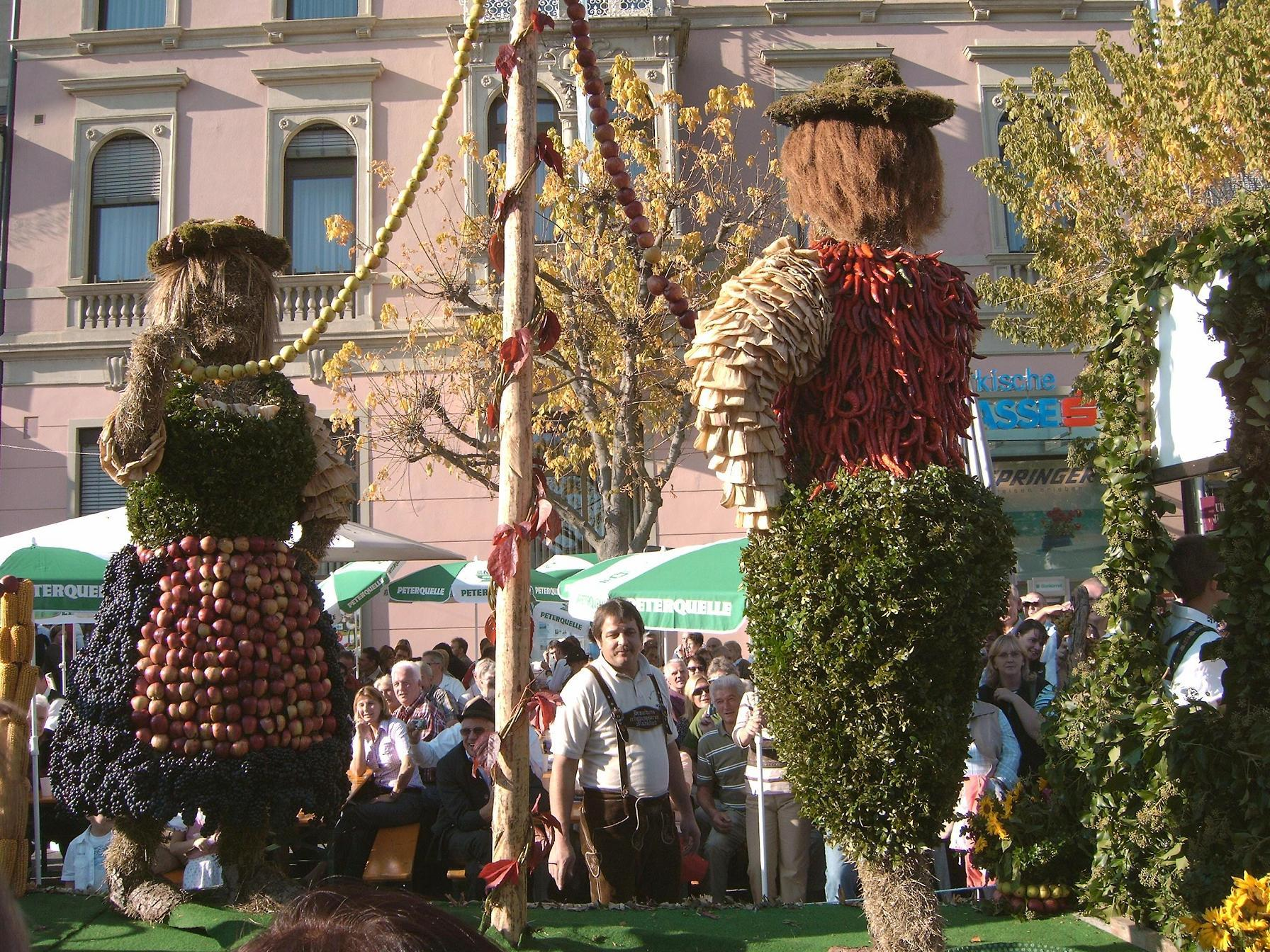
Harvest Festival Procession (2008)

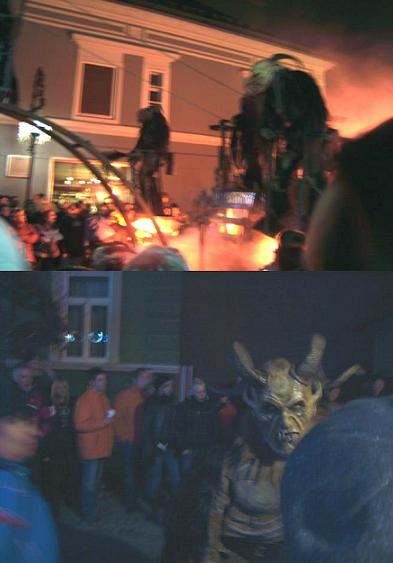
Procession with Perchta
(November 2009)

== Economy ==
The area surrounding Leibnitz (known as the "Leibnitzer Feld") is extensively cultivated, the main crops being maize and pumpkin. The latter is used in the production of the black-green colored pumpkin seed oil, a Styrian speciality. Several small to medium-sized industrial companies and also some smaller hotels and boarding houses are located within the town.

The areas of hilly countryside around the town support many vineyards, which itself is a renowned center of wine production.

== Transportation ==
Leibnitz lies on the main southern railway line, connecting Vienna to Slovenia and the Croatia- northern parts especially like towns Čakovec or Varaždin via Graz. The journey from Graz main station to Leibnitz takes approximately 30 minutes using trains travelling to Spielfeld-Straß, Maribor or even Ljubljana or Zagreb. There are also several taxi firms based in Leibnitz.

Leibnitz is also served by the A9 motorway, the main route to Slovenia via Spielfeld.

== Notable people ==
- Anton Elschnig (1863–1939), a pioneer of eye surgery in the early 1900s
- Rupert Marko (born 1963), an Austrian retired football player and a coach who played over 200 games
- Thomas Muster (born 1967), an Austrian former world No. 1 tennis player in 1996
- Thomas Pucher (born 1969) an Austrian architect, award winner for the NIK Office Building, in Graz

== International relations ==
=== Twin towns — sister cities ===
Leibnitz is twinned with:

- Pedra Badejo, Cape Verde
