= Flavia Solva =

Coordinates: 46.766744°N 15.567417°E

Flavia Solva was a municipium in the ancient Roman province of Noricum. It was situated on the western banks of the Mur river, close to the modern cities of Wagna and Leibnitz in the southern parts of the Austrian province of Styria. It is the only Roman city in modern Austrian Styria.

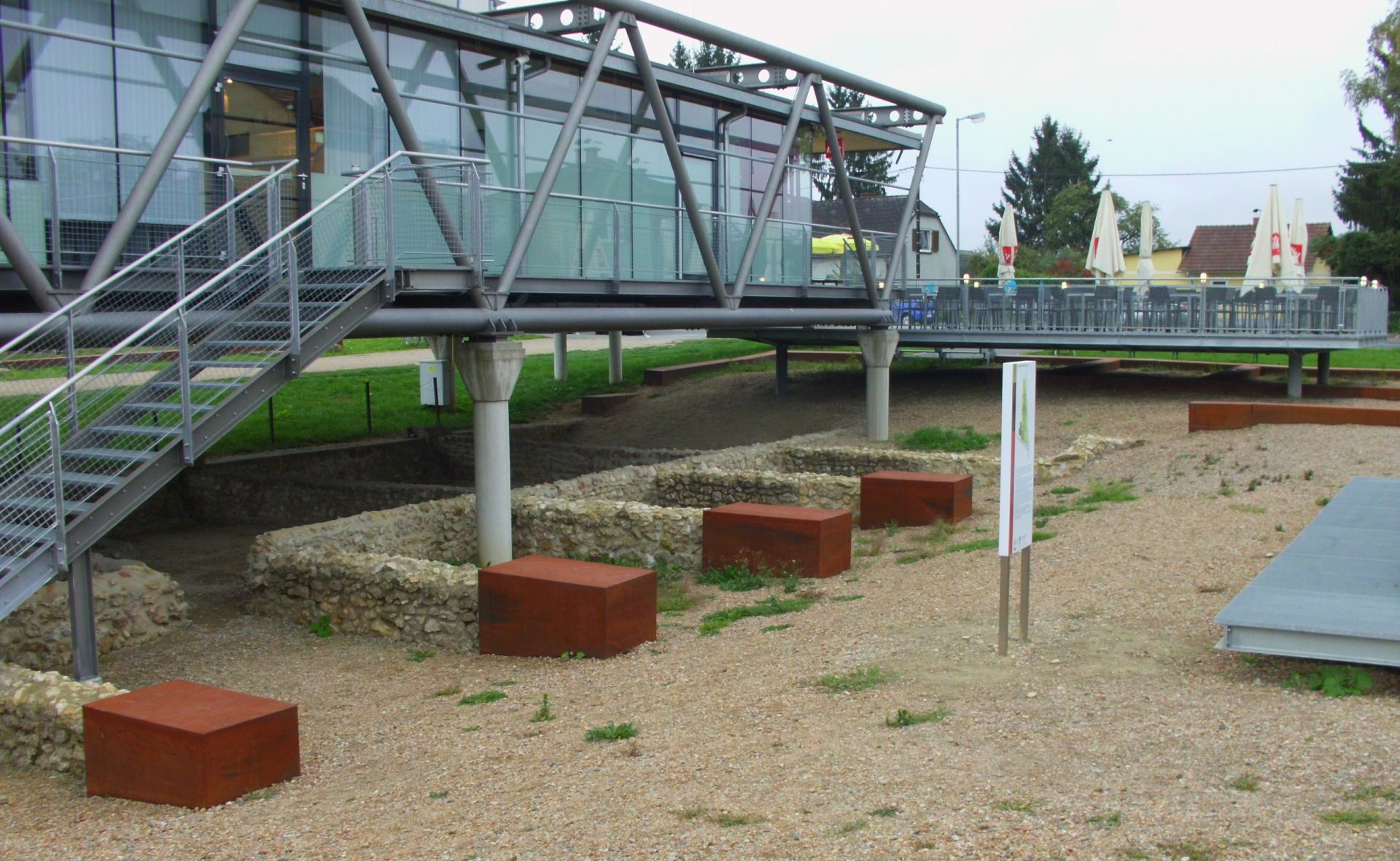
Covered Foundation walls of a Roman house (2013)

== Foundation and layout ==
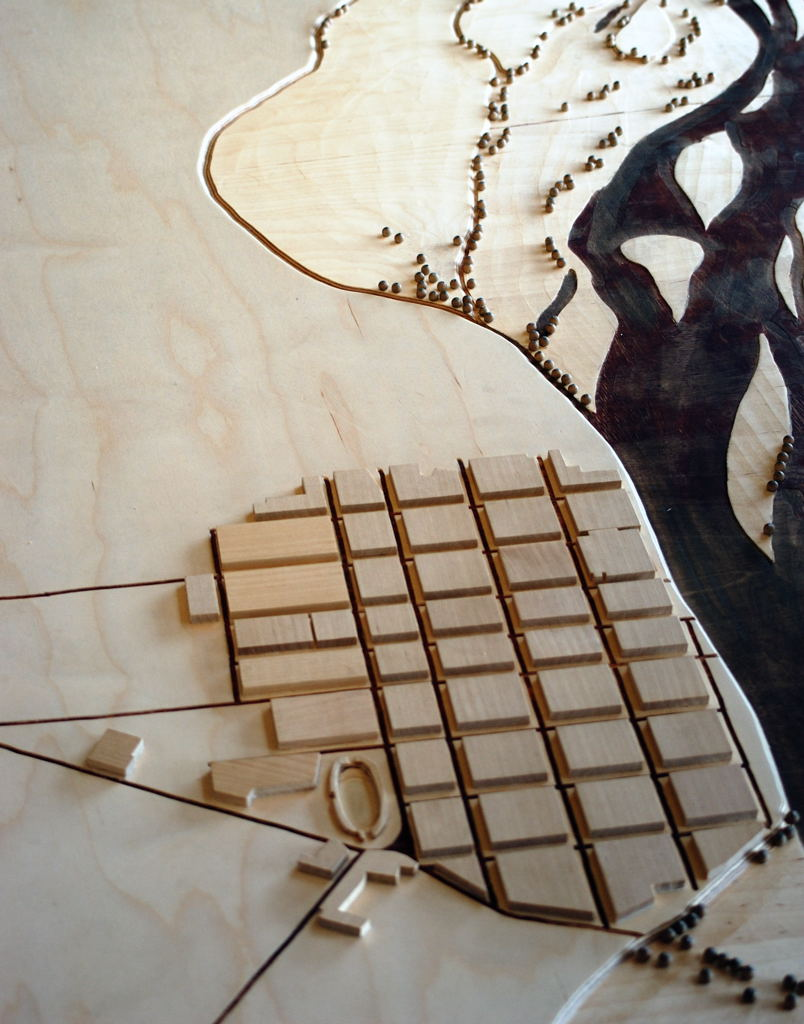
Schematic model of Flavia Solva with the Mur river, representing the state of research in 2004. (North is up)

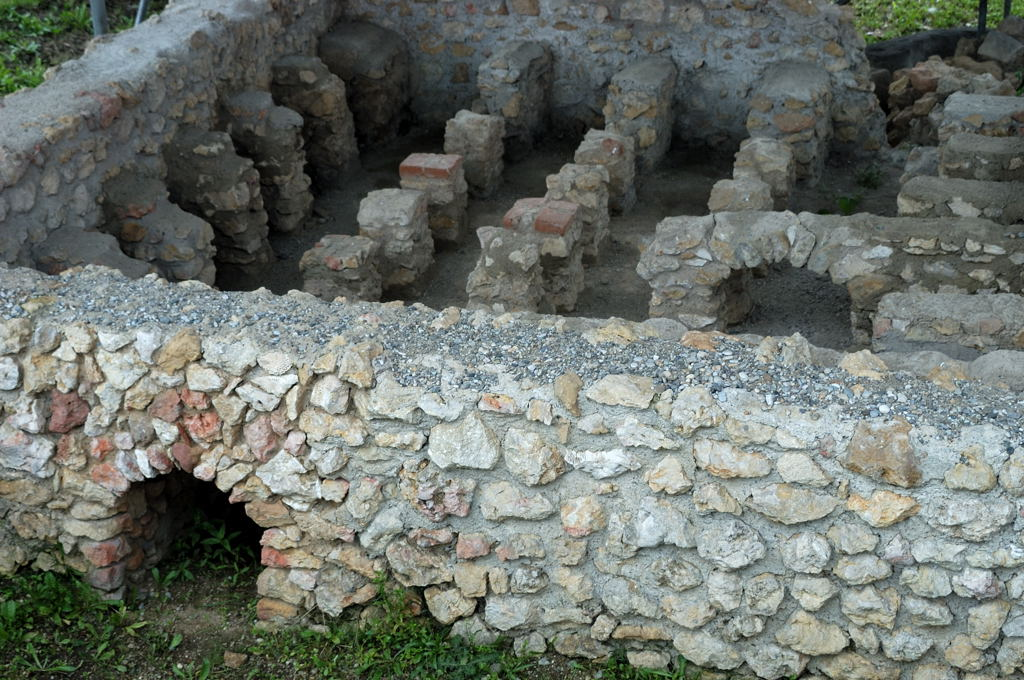
Foundations of a house in Flavia Solva showing the hypocaust heating system

The Celto-Roman dwelling on the banks of the Mur river that should later become Flavia Solva was founded around year 15 while Noricum was still a Roman protectorate. This precursor consisted of a small cluster of wooden buildings, and did not follow a grand layout plan. It is believed that the Celtic element in its population came from the hill settlement on the nearby Frauenberg which had a tradition tracing back to Neolithic ages. Very few remains from this phase have been found.

Shortly after the annexation of Noricum as a Roman province, the place was made a municipium around year 70 by emperor Vespasian who added the name of his Flavian dynasty to the local name Solva which might have referred to the Frauenberg settlement (which remained important as a worship site for Isis Noreia, a local adaptation of the Isis cult), or to the nearby river Sulm. The construction activity that followed resulted in an almost entirely new city of stone buildings, with a layout that approximated the ideal of a Roman provincial municipium: rectangular insulae (sized about 60 by 70 meters) within a grid of broad (ca. 6 m) gravel-paved streets. Some of the apartment houses in these blocks had hypocaust heating, similar to what is known from comparable Roman cities; however, Flavia Solva had neither an aqueduct nor canalization. The 80 x 35 m ellipsoid amphitheatre (apparently the only one in Noricum) consisted of wooden benches on stone foundations.

The city was situated at the crossings of a Roman road connecting Poetovia (modern Ptuj in Slovenia) to Ovilava (modern Wels) and the Danube in Upper Austria with a minor trade route connecting the administrative center at Virunum in the Carinthian basin across the Koralpe and through the Sulm valley to Pannonia. However, the wealth of Flavia Solva seems to have been derived more from agriculture than from trade, and was relatively modest. In the Roman sources known to today's historians the city is mentioned only once, in Pliny the Elder's Naturalis historia (Vol. 3, chapter 24, 146).

== Role in Roman administration ==
The administrative district of Flavia Solva covered much of what today is central Styria. Its approximate borders probably were the Eisenerz mountains in the North, the Koralpe in the West, the river Drau in the South, and the river Lafnitz in the East. In spite of its important local role, the city was never fortified.

== Destructions, decline, and rediscovery ==
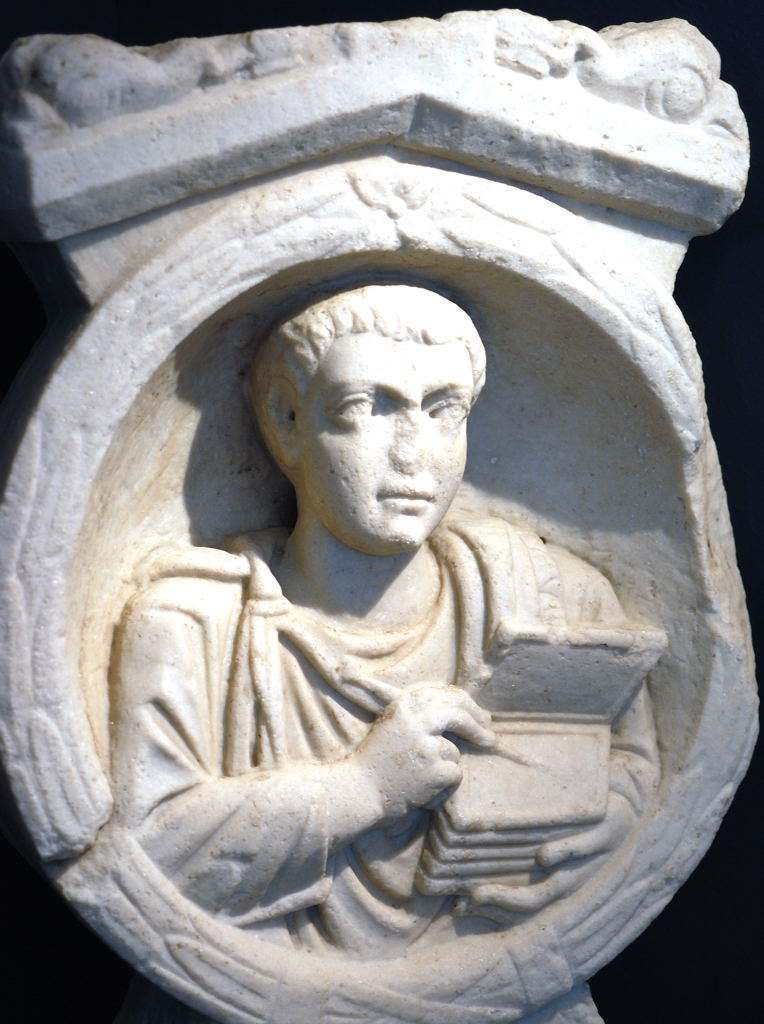
A Roman scribe's tombstone from Flavia Solva

Flavia Solva and its surroundings had developed a modest degree of provincial luxury, with the villa rustica as the typical form of aristocratic countryside residence and agricultural cultivation, when its peaceful development was ended by its first destruction in 166. At this time the Marcomanni breached the Danube limes between the fortifications of Vindobona (modern Vienna) and Carnuntum, penetrated northwestern Pannonia and eastern Noricum using the Roman road system tracing the ancient Amber Road along the eastern fringe of the Alps, and could be stopped by emperor Marcus Aurelius's hastily assembled militia only shortly before reaching Aquileia.

Flavia Solva was rebuilt (though originally much smaller) under Marcus Aurelius's son and successor Commodus, and flourished again a few decades later. By the early 3rd century, the city had a well-organized public fire brigade as evidenced by the Tabula Centonariorum membership list dating from 205.

Flavia Solva lost much of its importance during the late 4th century when the region suffered more incursions. The city was destroyed again in 405 (most probably during the Germanic invasion of Italy by Radagaisus), but some isolated finds referring to emperor Marcian suggest that a residual settlement must have remained at least until the 450s. At this time, most of the remaining population had moved back uphill to the Frauenberg where they established a new fortified settlement. The associated cemetery, which was identified only in the 1990s, is the largest from this latest Roman times known to exist in the eastern Alpine region.

The ruins of Flavia Solva were still a landmark during the Middle Ages although its origins were long forgotten, and they served the population as convenient quarries for construction material. The Renaissance period, and later on Romanticism, precipitated renewed interest in Roman history. During the 19th century, many gravestones and a considerable amount of stone artwork was incorporated in the nearby Schloss Seggau where they can still be seen. However, it was not until 1845 that Richard Knabl, a local parish priest and amateur historian, identified the site near the modern city of Leibnitz as the remains of Flavia Solva.

== Modern excavations ==
Flavia Solva has been a major focus for Austrian archaeology since the early 20th century; unfortunately (but typically) because construction activity constantly precipitated emergency digs. Road construction, the expansion of nearby Wagna, and a sewage trench that was dug across the site in the 1970s have caused much irretrievable damage. Over the decades, an area of 650 x 600 m (comprising about 40 insulae) has been excavated to some degree, although much of the finds are not visible today because the areas were reclaimed for agriculture or buried under modern buildings. A considerable piece of land which geoprospection has shown to harbor ruins has been placed under government protection. However, the full extent of the ancient city is still unknown.

A bone flute with three finger holes, presumably a shepherd's instrument, was excavated in such a well-preserved state that it can be played today.

The Styrian exhibition of 2004 had its focus on Flavia Solva. The Joanneum at Wagna maintains a permanent exhibition.
