= Nell Hirschberg =

American microbiologist (1907–1988)

- Hirschberg, from the 1928 yearbook of Smith College
- Born: September 30, 1907; Cincinnati, Ohio, U.S.
- Died: November 16, 1988 (aged 81); Raleigh, North Carolina, U.S.
- Occupations: Bacteriologist, educator, music director

Nell Yondorf Hirschberg (September 30, 1907 – November 16, 1988) was an American public health microbiologist and bacteriologist, based in North Carolina. She was a professor of biology at North Carolina Central University from 1963 to 1976.

== Early life and education ==
Hirschberg was born in Cincinnati, Ohio, the daughter of Sylvan Hirschberg and Alma M. Yondorf Hirschberg. Her father owned a cigar factory. She had two sisters; her sister Kate Hirschberg Kohn was a medical doctor and rehabilitation specialist.

Hirschberg graduated from Smith College in 1928, with a bachelor's degree in physics. She earned a master's degree in biology at the University of Colorado Boulder and completed doctoral studies in microbiology and public health in 1937 at the University of Illinois. During World War II she earned a certificate in tropical medicine from the Army Medical School.

== Career ==
Hirschberg was a bacteriologist at a hospital in Illinois after college. She moved to Raleigh in 1942 with the United States Public Health Service, and was affiliated with the North Carolina State Laboratory of Hygiene, later the North Carolina Department of Health, from 1945 to 1963. She taught biology at North Carolina Central University from 1963 until her retirement in 1976. She directed NCCU's summer microbiology institute for college teachers. In 1978 she was presented with the Smith College Medal.

In 1973, Hirschberg became the first woman to serve as the president of Temple Beth Or in Raleigh. She was vice-president of the National Federation of Temple Sisterhoods. In 1968, she attended the meeting of the World Union for Progressive Judaism in Jerusalem, and met Israeli president Zalman Shazar and prime minister Levi Eshkol.

From 1970 to 1976 Hirschberg was a member of the board of directors of the North Carolina branch of the American Civil Liberties Union (ACLU). In 1987 she was honored by the ACLU's Wake Forest chapter for her civil rights work. She wrote music reviews for the Raleigh News and Observer, and endowed a chair in the North Carolina Symphony.

== Publications ==
Hirschberg's research was published in scientific journals including Journal of Immunology, The Journal of Infectious Diseases, American Review of Tuberculosis, The American Journal of the Medical Sciences, American Journal of Digestive Diseases, Archives of Pediatrics & Adolescent Medicine, American Journal of Public Health, and Journal of Bacteriology.

- "Complement Fixation Test in Carcinoma" (1933, with William Saphir)
- "Complement-Fixation and Opsonification Tests of Smooth and Rough Tubercle Bacilli with the Serum of Patients Suffering from Different Grades of Tuberculosis" (1935, with Ruth Tunnicliff and Katharine M. Howell)
- "The Effect of Human Tissue Juices on Tubercle Bacilli" (1938, with Lloyd Arnold)
- "Phagocytic Activity in Leukemia" (1939)
- "Note on a Cretin's Response to Typhoid Inoculation" (1941, with I. P. Bronstein)
- "Cellulose splitting micro-organisms in human feces" (1942)
- "Isolation of Intestinal Pathogens From Preserved Stools of Children" (1942)
- "Fractions of Brucella for Adsorbed Antigens for Collodion Agglutination and Hemagglutination Tests" (1952, with Mary E. Yarbrough)
- "Laboratory Services in the Diagnosis of Leptospirosis" (1956, with Lynn Maddry and Martin Hines)
- "Direct Performance and Darkfield Readings of Leptospira Tests in Plastic Trays with Depressions" (1958)
- "An Investigation of Possible Wild Animal Hosts of Leptospires in the Area of the 'Fort Bragg Fever' Outbreaks" (1959, with Mildred M. Galton, Robert W. Menges, Martin P. Hines, and Robert Haberman)
- "Simplified Method for Staining Smears for Fluorescent Antibody" (1962)
- "Standardization of Milk Plating Media" (1963, with Thomas Bartram, Lewis J. Crally, Alfred Evans, Tom S. Gable, Ralph B. Hogan, and Howard L. Bodily)

== Personal life and legacy ==
Hirschberg lived and traveled for many years with Geraldine Cate, an activist, educator, and musician. Their 1949 house in Raleigh was designed by modernist architect Fred Carter Williams. Hirschberg died in 1988, in Raleigh, at the age of 81. There is a collection of her papers at Smith College. and she donated art to the North Carolina Museum of Art.
