= Alice Hirschberg =

English painter (1856–1913)

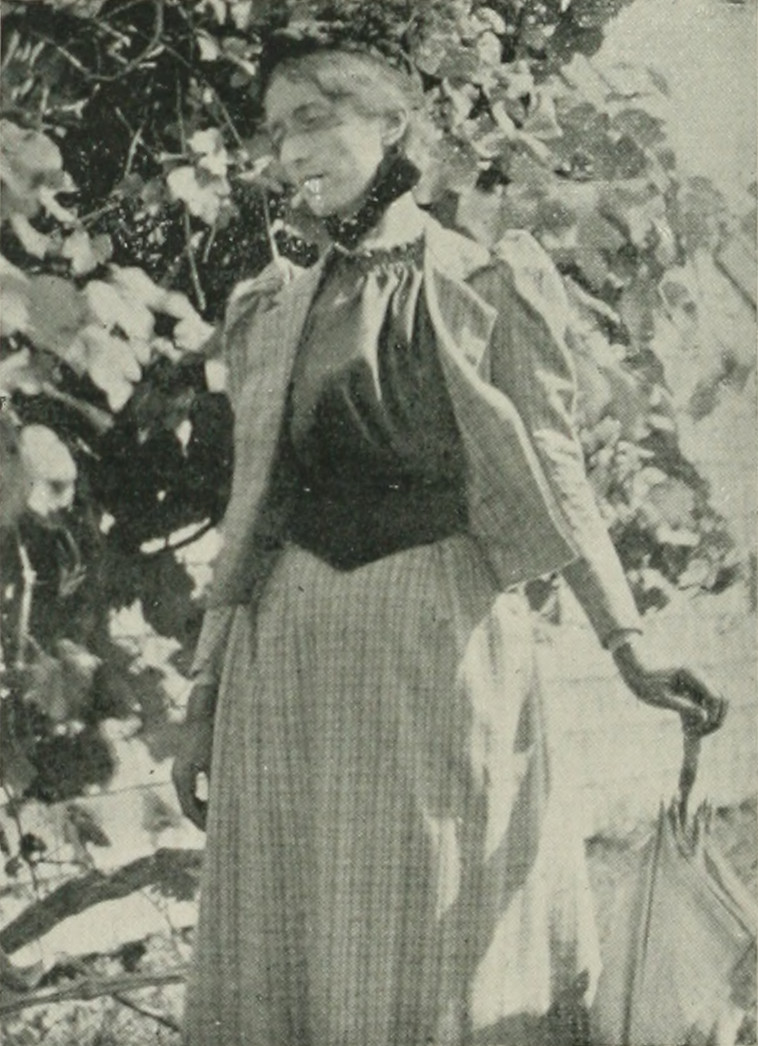
Alice Kerr-Nelson Hirschberg

Alice Hirschberg (née Alice Kerr-Nelson; 12 February 1856 - 1913) was a British-born American painter and illustrator. She worked in water-color and black-and-white, as well as genre subjects and landscapes in oils.

Since coming to the United States in 1884, Hirschberg contributed every year to the exhibitions of the American Watercolor Society in New York City. One of her most effective water-colors was Maggie Tulliver in the Red Deeps, from George Eliot's "Mill on the Floss," which she sent to the Society in 1887. Her Trysting Place was published in an etching by William Langson Lathrop, and another of her drawings entitled How de Do was engraved by Frederick E. Girsch and also published. She also illustrated for magazines.

== Early years and education ==
Alice Kerr-Nelson was born in England, 12 February 1856, daughter of George W. and Emily Kerr-Nelson. She belonged to an Old county family whose pedigree in Burke's Landed Gentry dates back to Richard Nelson, who flourished in 1377. She was educated without particular attention to her artistic talents.

Like every English school-girl, she took drawing lessons as part of her regular studies; but it was not till she was 21 years old, after seeing some water-colors by David Cox and William Midler in the Print Room of the British Museum, that she made any serious effort to work in that medium. At the age of 22, she sent her first picture, a water-color, to the Royal Academy. It was rejected, but it found a purchaser. She obtained leave to copy at the Museum, and then worked at Heatherley School of Fine Art in Newman Street, London. There, she began to paint heads and costumed figures, which she sold in country exhibitions in England. In the school, she met Carl Hirschberg, and they married in 1882.

== Career ==
After her marriage, she studied in one of the Paris ateliers for women, and exhibited a water-color in the Salon of 1884. Hirschberg said she owed more to her husband's teaching than to the slight criticisms of Raphael Collin, who visited the women's class once a week.

Hirschberg exhibited some of her work in the Salon of 1884. In the same year, the Hirschbergs removed to the United States. She exhibited the next year in the collection of the American Watercolor Society, and was a regular contributor to its exhibitions. Her principal pictures are: "The Lace Maker," "Vieille Normande," "An Interested Spectator," "Aunt Phoebe," "Maggie Tulliver," "The Trysting Place," "Sunday Afternoon," "At Meeting," "Beach Plum Gatherers," "Look, then, into Thine Own Heart and Write," "A Lesson," "Music," "Hide and Seek."

== Personal life ==
Her family consisted of three sons. She had a home and studio in Morristown, New Jersey, and later in Buffalo, New York.

== Gallery ==
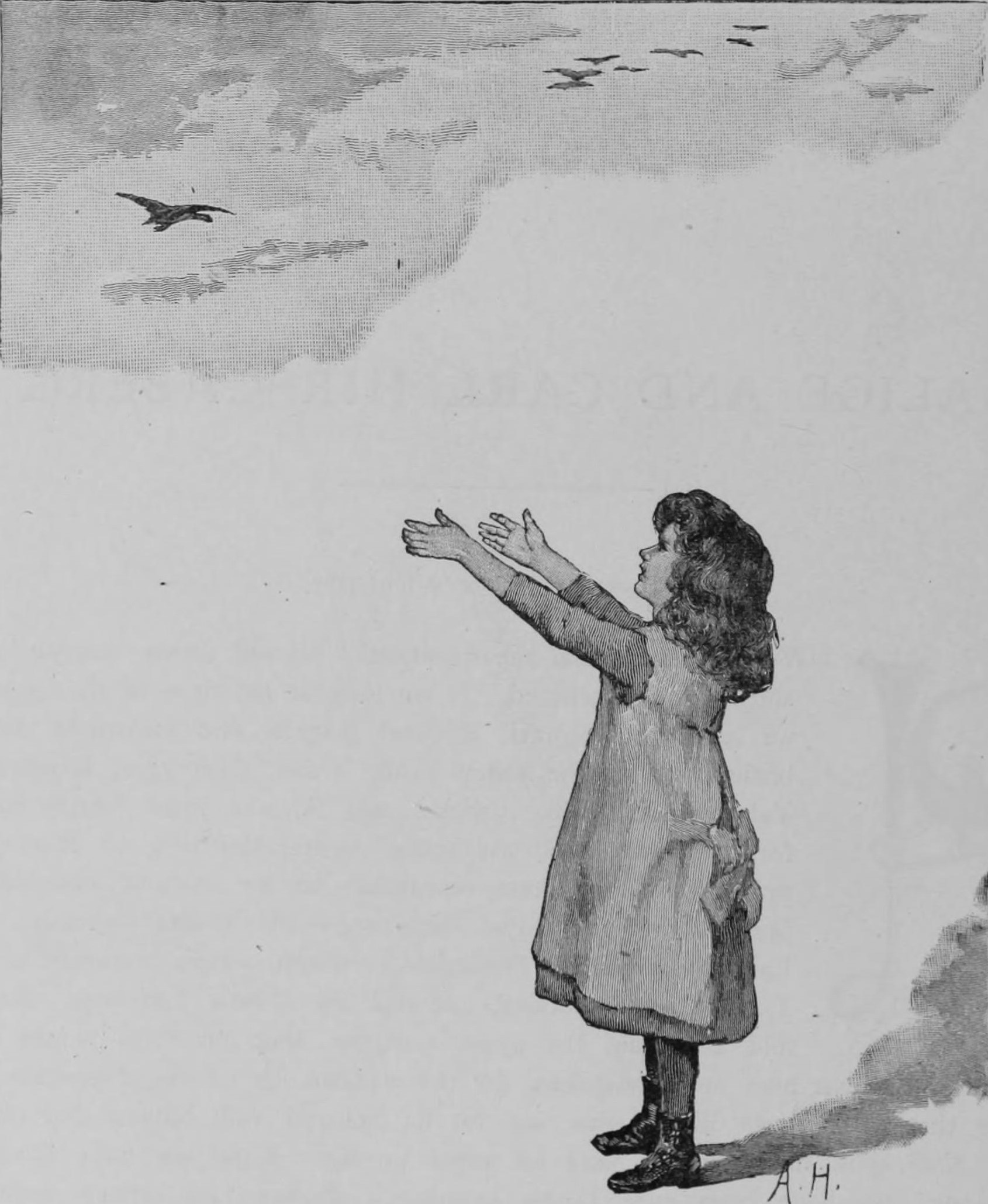
"Calling in Vain"

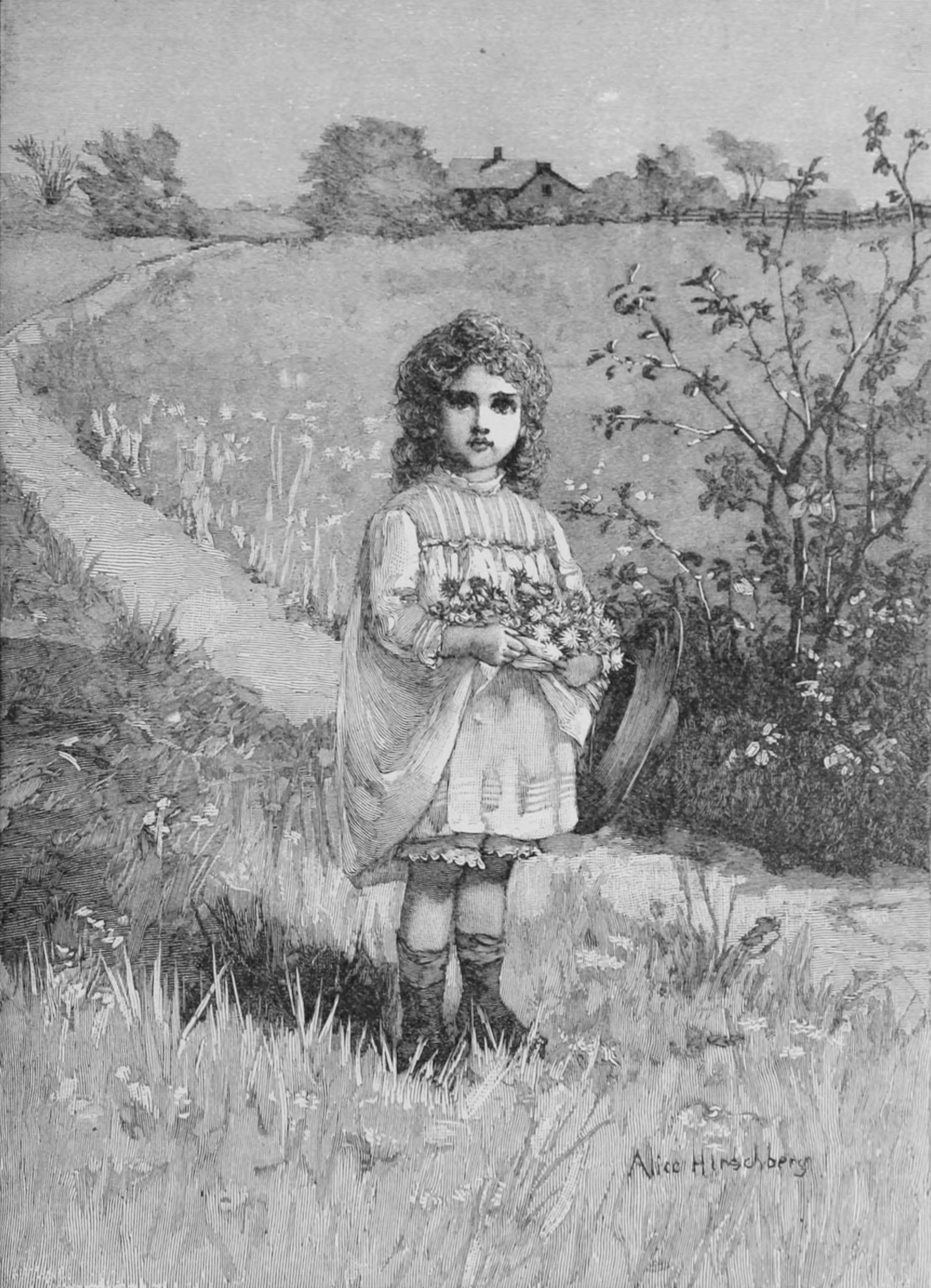
"The Dandelion Girl"

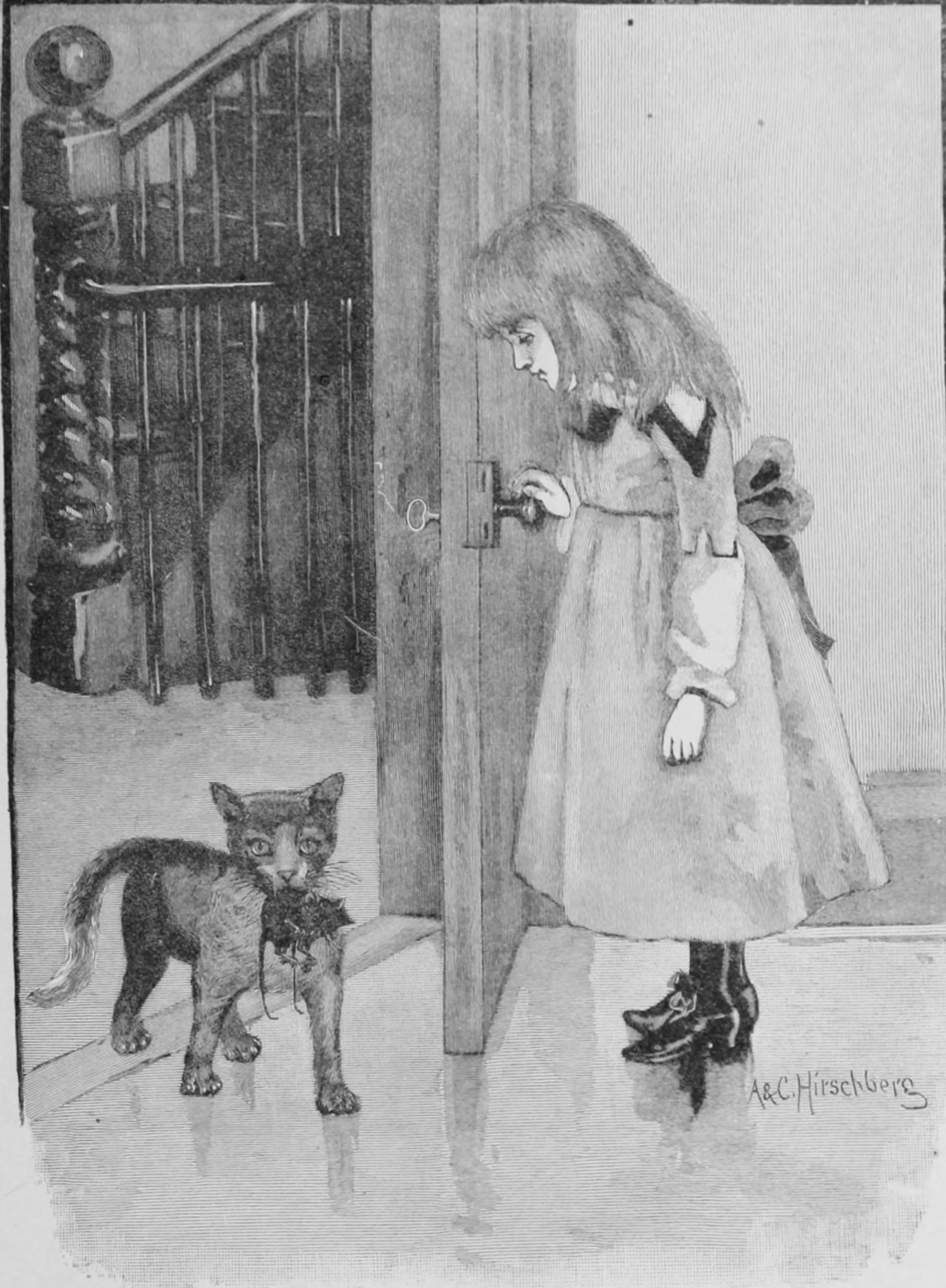
"The Gratitude of Sir John"

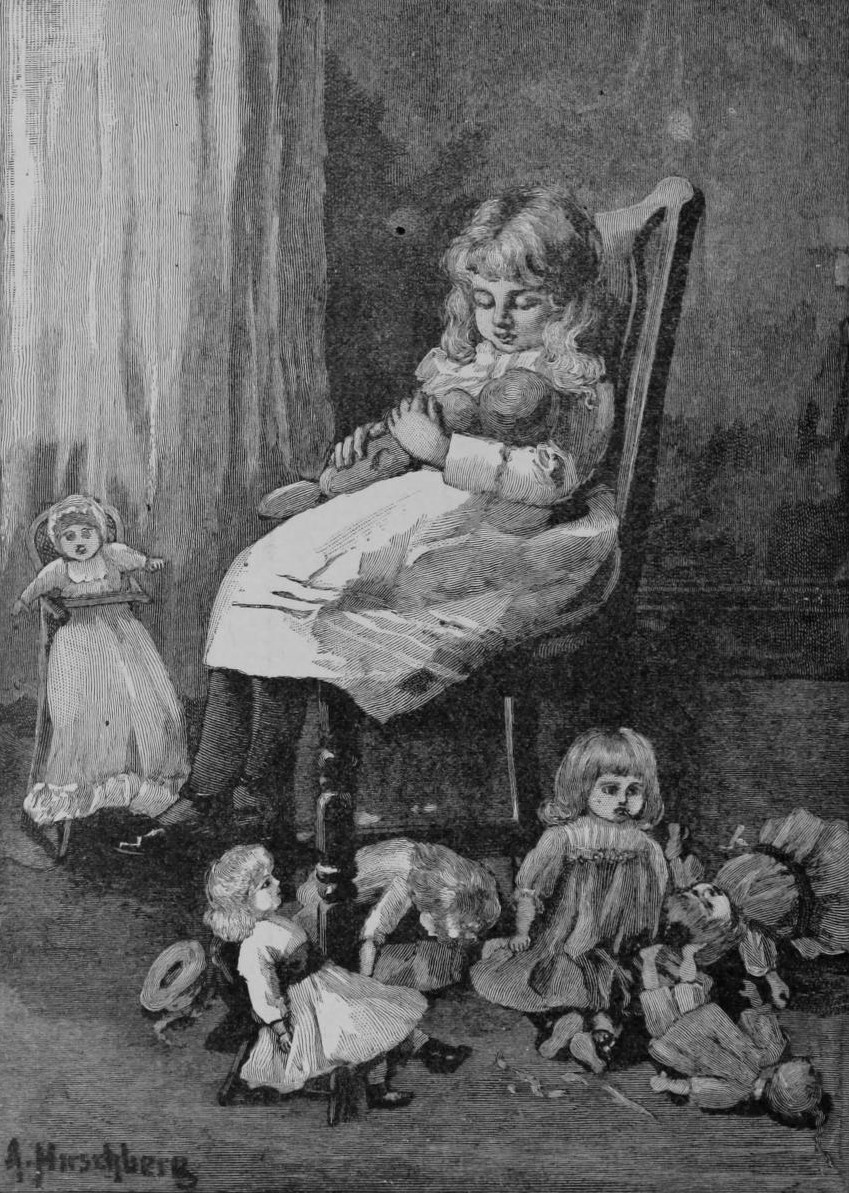
"The Homely Doll"

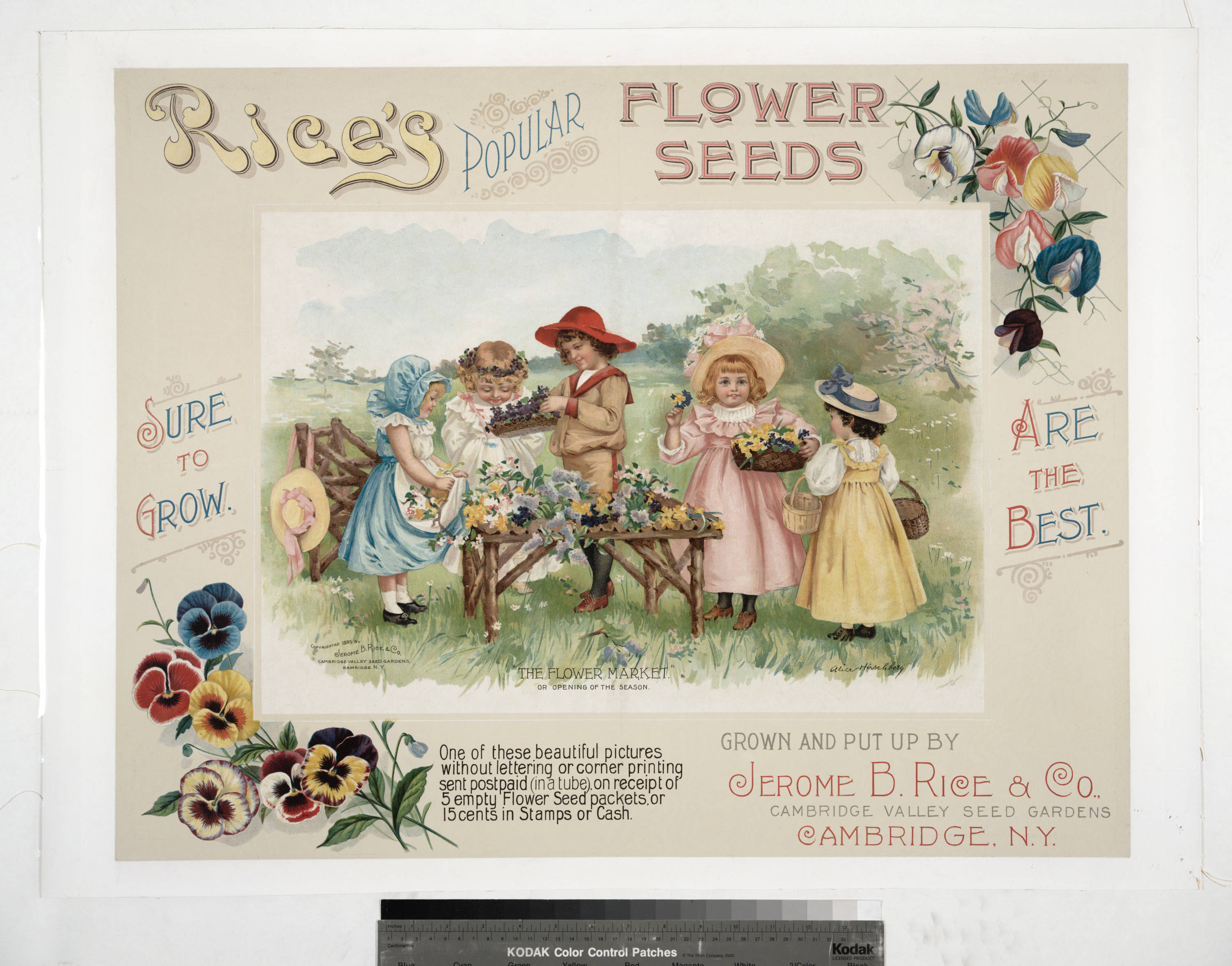
"The Flower Market"
