= Mary Beth Harshbarger =

American hunter acquitted of murder (born 1965)

- Born: February 19, 1965 (age 61)
- Known for: Shooting death of her husband
- Criminal charge: Criminal negligence causing death
- Criminal status: Not guilty
- Spouse: Mark B. Harshbarger (m. 2001; died 2006)
- Children: 3

Mary Beth Harshbarger (born February 19, 1965) is an American woman who rose to media attention when she shot her husband, Mark Harshbarger, during a hunting trip in Newfoundland, Canada, thinking he was a bear. She was charged with "criminal negligence causing death" and found not guilty.

== Background ==
Harshbarger lived in Meshoppen, Pennsylvania with her husband Mark (married on June 23, 2001) and their two children.

== Shooting incident ==
On September 14, 2006, Mary Beth, her husband Mark and their two young children, and Mark's brother Barry Harshbarger, were on a hunting trip outside of Buchans Junction, Newfoundland and Labrador, Canada. The facts of the case state that Mary Beth was sitting in the back of a Chevy pickup truck with her children, armed with a rifle, on a logging road late in the day. She waited with her children while Mark and a local hunting guide walked through the nearby spruce woods in the hopes of flushing out a black bear. Barry was at a hunting blind elsewhere in the woods.

Mark began to walk back toward the truck with the guide, the guide stopping to urinate in the woods. At this point Mark walked towards the van, ahead of the guide, in dark clothing without an orange hunting hat or vest to improve his visibility. At 7:55 pm (NT) as he emerged from the woods, Mary Beth told police that she saw a dark shape that she believed was a black bear, and fired her rifle. What she shot was not a black bear however, but was instead her husband Mark. When he was shot, Mark Harshbarger was approximately 200 feet from the truck in which his wife Mary Beth and two children were seated. In recounting the incident to Royal Canadian Mounted Police (RCMP) officers at the lodge where they were staying immediately after the shooting, Mary Beth said she had looked through the scope twice to make sure what she was seeing really was a bear. She insisted that she had not seen the blue of Mark Harshbarger's pants, but instead seen the black of a bear.

According to Dr. Nash Denic, the St. John's, Newfoundland pathologist who autopsied him, Mark Harshberger died of one gunshot wound to the abdomen. Dr. Denic revealed during Mary Beth Harshbarger's trial that Mark would most likely have been leaning over when he was struck by a bullet.

== Trial ==
Following a lengthy investigation, Canadian officials issued charges in April 2008. After several years of appeals, Mary Beth Harshbarger was ordered by U.S. District Judge Thomas I. Vanaskie to surrender to the U.S. Marshals Service by 2pm on May 14, 2010. She was then extradited to Canada to stand trial for criminal negligence in the case of her husband's shooting in 2006. Mary Beth Harshbarger arrived in Newfoundland on May 17 to face the charges. If convicted, Mary Beth faced a minimum of four years in prison.

Mary Beth Harshbarger was tried in the Newfoundland and Labrador Supreme Court in Grand Falls-Windsor on a count of criminal negligence. The case was heard without a jury in the courtroom of Justice Richard LeBlanc.

During a re-enactment that was used as evidence by the defense during the trial, hunting guide Lambert Greene and Reg White owner of the Moosehead Lodge where the Harshbargers stayed during their trip, said what they saw through Harshbarger's rifle scope looked more animal than human. Police who conducted two re-enactments said that all they could make out through Mary Beth's rifle scope was a “black mass” and that it was “plausible” that she thought she was aiming at a bear. The prosecution argued that Mary Beth knew her husband was in those woods, and that it was possible he would be emerging from the site at any time, wearing dark clothing.

In Mary Beth's defense, Dr. Denic, the pathologist that conducted an autopsy on Mark Harshbarger after his fatal accident concluded that Mark was most likely leaning or hunched over when he was struck by the bullet. The issue of his posture was significant to the trial as Mary Beth had steadily maintained that she thought her husband was a black bear. Several witnesses during the trial suggested that it was too dark for any hunter to have shot with confidence.

Mary Beth was found not guilty of criminal negligence causing death in the shooting death of her husband. Justice Richard LeBlanc concluded that the Crown had failed to prove Harshbarger displayed a complete disregard for the safety of others, and that the death was “a result of an accident and nothing more”.

== Controversy ==
While Mary Beth believed she shot at a bear and that her mistake could be attributed to her poor visibility and Mark's dark clothing and was found not guilty by a judge, the Harshbarger family has insisted that the shooting was deliberate. Mark's father Leonard Harshbarger was quoted in the media as saying "It isn't an accident to mistake someone for something else and kill him. That's a negligent act…"

There are reports that Mary Beth and her husband Mark had increased their life insurance not long before the hunting trip. Mary Beth collected on life insurance policies worth $550,000 (US).

After Mark Harshbarger's death from injuries sustained during the shooting incident, his brother Barry Harshbarger moved into the marital home that his brother had shared with Mary Beth and Mary Beth and Barry began a relationship. However, when Mary Beth Harshbarger left the home to stand trial in Canada in May 2011, Barry Harshbarger engaged in a relationship with another woman.

Following her acquittal and return to her home that Barry was still living in, on November 1, 2011, Barry Harshbarger obtained a temporary protection from abuse order (PFA) against Mary Beth, claiming that ‘I am in fear for my life', alleging she had unstable behaviour and past violence. In the order Barry Harshbarger claimed that Mary Beth had threatened him by pointing a loaded rifle at him at some point prior to October 18, 2011. At the hearing, the judge found that Barry's claims were inaccurate exaggerations and were not enough to keep the protective order in place.

== Media coverage ==
The shooting incident and the subsequent trial garnered significant media interest. The story was televised by Dateline NBC under the title "As Darkness Fell", The Fifth Estate in a special entitled "Til Death Do Us Part" and Snapped titled "Mary Beth Harshbarger" on the Oxygen Network.

Outdoor Canada magazine conducted an in-depth investigative report into the story in their Winter 2010 issue entitled "Another Fine Day Afield".
