= Eugenie Hirschberg-Pucher =

Baltic German writer (1862–1937)

- Born: Eugenie Pucher; 1862; Mitau, Courland Governorate, Russian Empire
- Died: 30 April 1937 (aged 74–75); Riga, Latvia
- Spouse: Wilhelm (Wulff) Hirschberg (m. 1887; died 1925)
- Parent: Solomon Pucher
- Writing career
- Pen name: Mme. Posdnischew
- Language: German

Eugenie Hirschberg-Pucher (1862 – 30 April 1937) was a Latvian poet and writer. Most of her work was published in the Latvian German-language press in the early 1900s.

== Biography ==
Eugenie Pucher was born in Mitau, Courland, to Rabbi Solomon Pucher and his wife Rosa. She married ophthalmologist Wilhelm (Wulff) Hirschberg in 1887. They lived in Vitebsk, Kharkov, and the Yekaterinoslav Governorate before settling permanently in Riga in 1911. There she operated a salon for local writers and artists.

She made her literary debut in 1886 with the poetry collection Schülerliebe. In 1896 she anonymously published the story Ihre Kreutzersonate, which was met with acclaim.

== Publications ==
- Schülerliebe. Dichtung in 7 Gesängen. Riga. 1886.
- Ihre Kreutzersonate. Aus dem Tagebuche der Mme. Posdnischew. Berlin: Hugo Steinitz. 1896. Translated into Dutch as Hare Kreutzersonate. Uit het dagboek van Mevrouw Posdnischew.
- "Die Auswanderer". Die Welt. 6 (19): 14. 1902. Translation of a poem by Simon Frug.
- "Schlummerlied". Baltische Monatsschrift: 234. 1905.
- Erwachen. Skizze in einem Aufzug. Riga. 1906.
- "Lied / Sing' mir das Lied / Mutter, ich küßt deine Hände / Wie Weihrauchduft entquell es deinen Worten / Ein neues Jahr—im Fluge kam es daher". Kiefern Im Schnee. Riga: G. Löffler: 32–36. 1906.
- Gedichte. Riga: G. Löffler. 1908.
- "Leben". Baltische Monatsschrift: 34. 1908.
- "Wo ist meine Seele". Baltische Monatsschrift: 280. 1910.
