= Aleksander Hirschberg =

Polish historian (1847–1907)

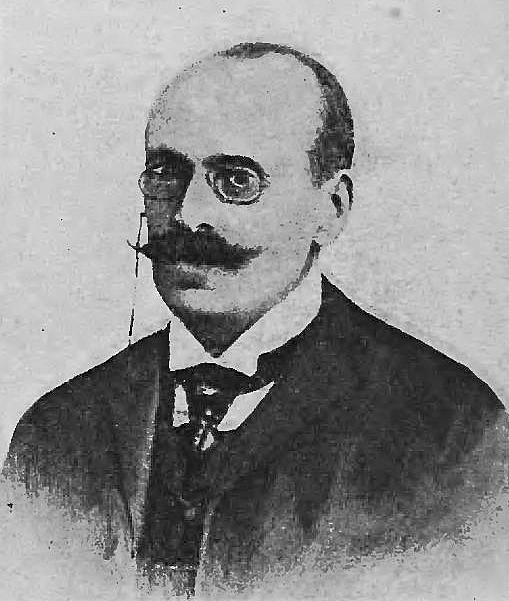
Aleksander Hirszberg (1847-1907)

Aleksander Hirschberg (15 December 1847 - 27 July 1907) was a Polish historian.

He was born at Lemberg (now Lviv, Ukraine) on 15 December 1847, and studied at the University there. From 1872 to 1875 he worked as a secondary school teacher. From 1875 he was a Privatdozent at the University, and from 1878 he worked in the library of the Ossolineum.

In 1881 Hirschberg founded, with Jan Amborski and others, the Towarzystwo Oświaty Ludowej (People's Education Society), of which he was the chair from 1882 to 1901. He was made a Professor of the University of Lemberg in 1905.
