= Wagna =

- Municipality
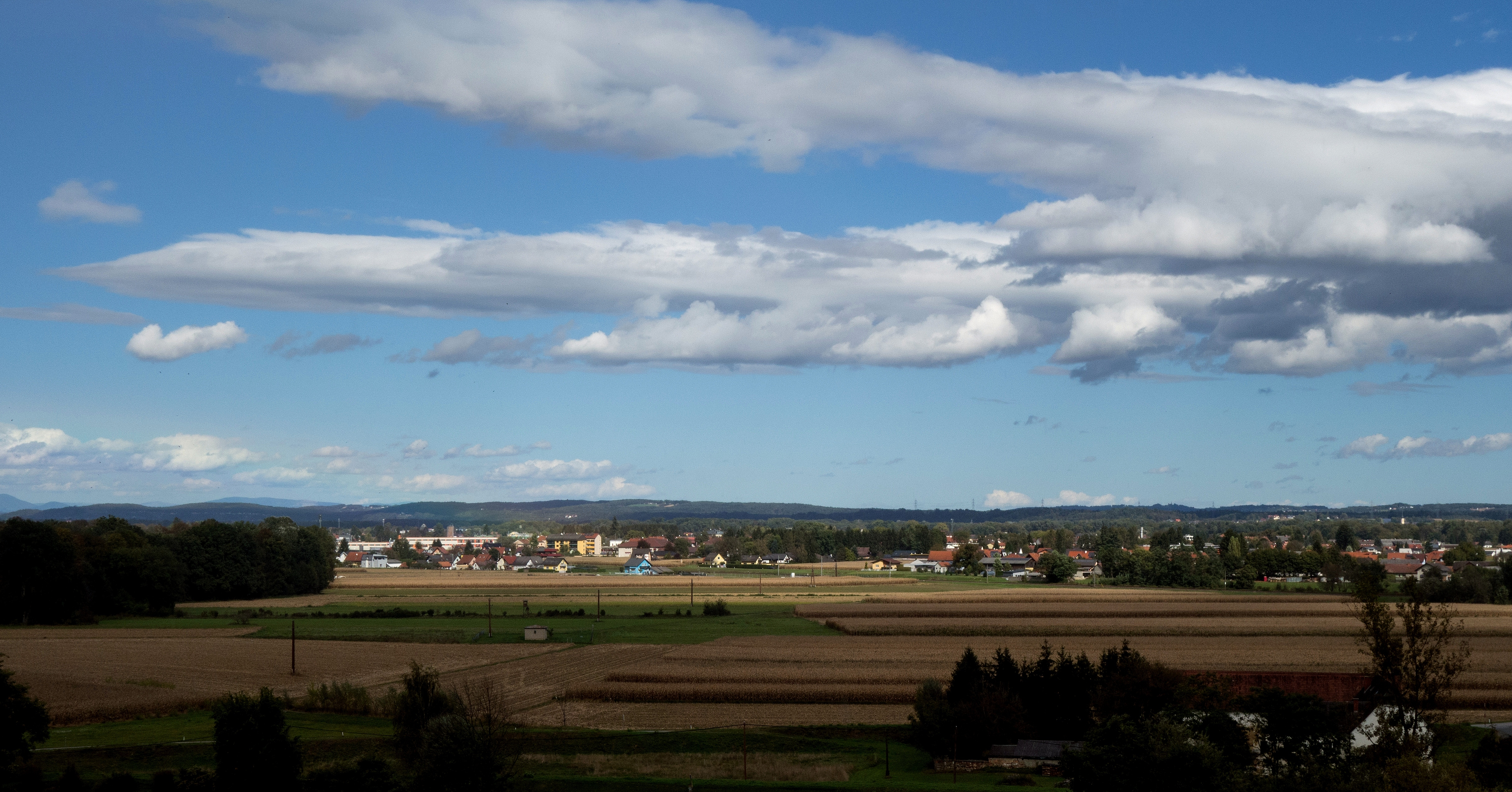

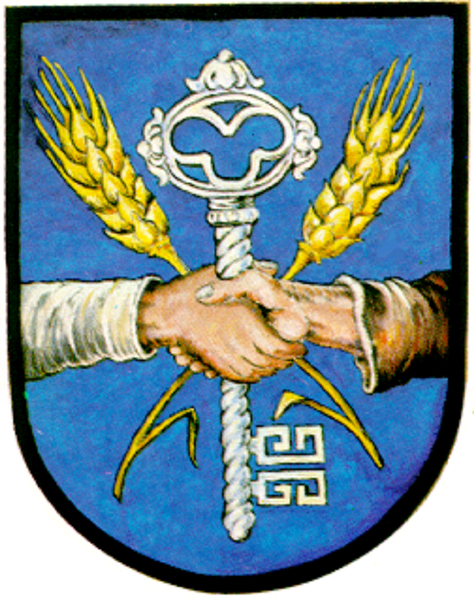
- Coat of arms

- Location within Austria
- Coordinates: 46°46′05″N 15°33′30″E
- Country: Austria
- State: Styria
- District: Leibnitz

Government
  - Mayor: Karl Deller (SPÖ)

Area
  - Total: 12.99 km^{2} (5.02 sq mi)
- Elevation: 266 m (873 ft)

Population (2018-01-01)
  - Total: 5,859
  - Density: 451.0/km^{2} (1,168/sq mi)
- Time zone: UTC+1 (CET)
  - Summer (DST): UTC+2 (CEST)
- Postal code: 8435
- Area code: 03452
- Vehicle registration: LB
- Website: www.wagna.at

Wagna (German: [ˈvaːɡna]) is a municipality in the district of Leibnitz in Austrian state of Styria. The ancient Roman town of Flavia Solva lies near what is today Wagna.

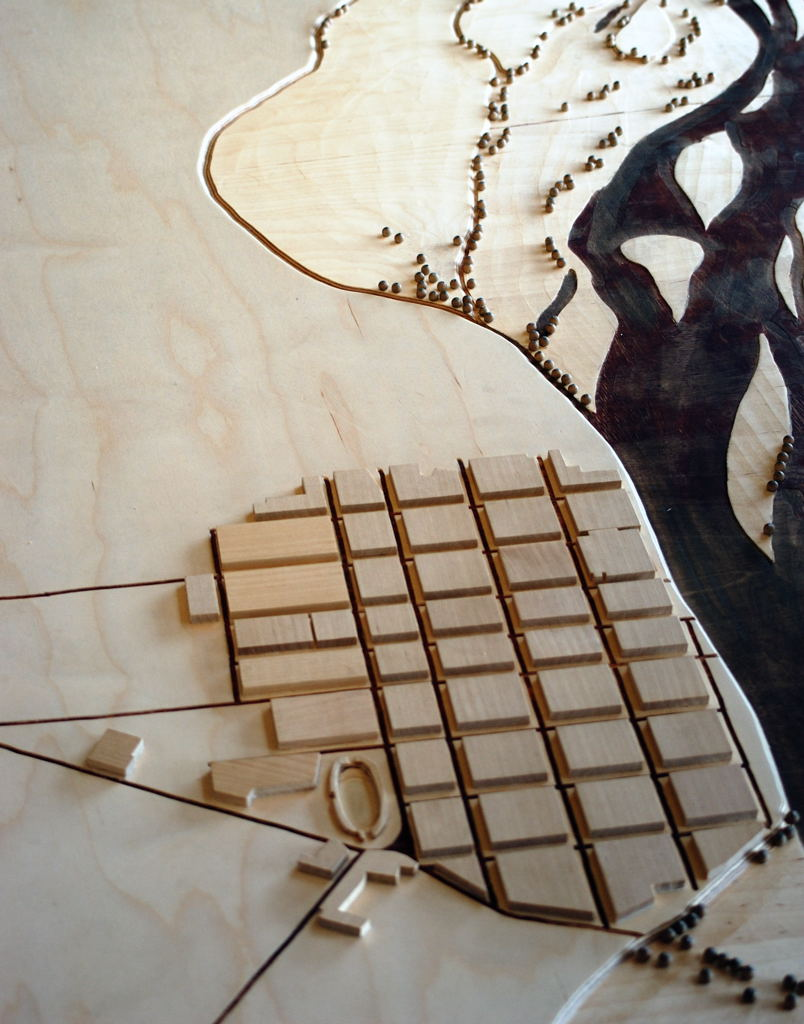
Schematic model of Flavia Solva with the Mur river, representing the state of research in 2004. (North is up)
