= Solomon Pucher =

Imperial Russian rabbi

Personal life
- Born: 1829 Neustadt-Schirwindt, Russian Poland
- Died: 23 November 1899 (aged 69–70) Riga, Governorate of Livonia, Russian Empire
- Spouse: Rosa Scheinesohn (m. 1860)
- Children: Eugenie Hirschberg-Pucher
- Education: Vilna Rabbinical School

Religious life
- Religion: Judaism

Solomon Pucher (Hebrew: שלמה פוחער; 1829 – 23 November 1899) was an Imperial Russian religious leader, who served as rabbi of Mitau and Riga.

== Biography ==
Solomon Pucher was born in 1829 in Neustadt-Schirwindt, Russian Poland. At the age of thirteen he was sent to study at the yeshiva of Georgenburg, during which time he became acquainted with Maskilic literature and began to learn German. He afterwards attended the Vilna Rabbinical School, and was called in 1859 to the rabbinate of Mitau. As a rabbi Pucher received from the government the silver and the gold medal of merit.

In the 1860s he publicly opposed the Christian mission to Jews in Courland in speeches and in written articles. He fought to obtain civil and political rights for the Jews, and in 1864 he was called to Saint Petersburg as a member of the commission for securing the right of residence to Jewish workers. About twenty years later he wrote and presented to Count Pahlen, chairman of the Jewish commission, who was staying in Courland, a detailed memorandum on the condition of the Jews.

Within the Jewish community, Pucher labored for the religious education of girls, establishing confirmation classes for them. The first girl's confirmation (a precursor to the modern bat mitzvah) in Courland was held in 1861 under his supervision. He also gave boys free religious instruction in the gymnasium, and founded in 1862 the Klub jüdischer Intellektueller (Jewish Intellectuals' Club).

In 1893 he accepted a call as rabbi to Riga, where he worked until 1898, when he retired from public life. The community at Riga raised a large fund in his honour, the interest of which was used for the benefit of widows and orphans.

== Partial bibliography ==
- Betrachtung über die 23 Oct. 1857 stattgefundene feierlichkeit in der rabbinershule zu Vilna. 1857.
- "Offenes Sendschreiben an die Kurländischen Herren Synodalen". Baltische Monatsschrift (in German). 16: 217–241. 1867.
- "Das wandernde und das ruhende Heiligthum". Einweihungsfeier des neuen Beth-ha-Midrasch (Lehr- und Bethaus) zu Mitau am 29 Mai 1870 (in German). Mitau: J.F. Steffenhagen. 1870.
- Offener Brief an den Herr Pastor Gurland von Salomon Pucher, Rabbiner der Jüdischen Gemeinde in Mitau (in German). Riga: Leopold Mende. 1875.
- Mitgefühl mit den Thieren, eine heilige Pflicht der jüdischen Religion: ein Wort an seine Glaubensgenossen (in German). Mitau: J.F. Steffenhagen. 1876.
- "Lehavin divrei ḥakhamim". Ha-Asif (in Hebrew). 4: 120–124. 1887.
