= Harshbarger =

Harshbarger is a surname. Notable people with the surname include:

- Bobby Harshbarger (born 1985), Tennessee politician
- Dema Harshbarger (1884–1964), American concert promoter and talent manager
- Diana Harshbarger (born 1960), American politician
- Eric Harshbarger, American puzzle designer, scrabble player, and mathematician
- Frances Harshbarger (1902–1987), American mathematician
- Jason Harshbarger (born 1974), American politician
- Jo Harshbarger (born 1956), American swimmer
- Julie Harshbarger (born 1985), American gridiron football player
- Mary Beth Harshbarger (born 1965), American hunter acquitted of murder
- Sallie Foster Harshbarger (1874–1958), American clubwoman
- Scott Harshbarger (born 1941), American politician
