= Thomas Pucher =

Austrian architect (born 1969)

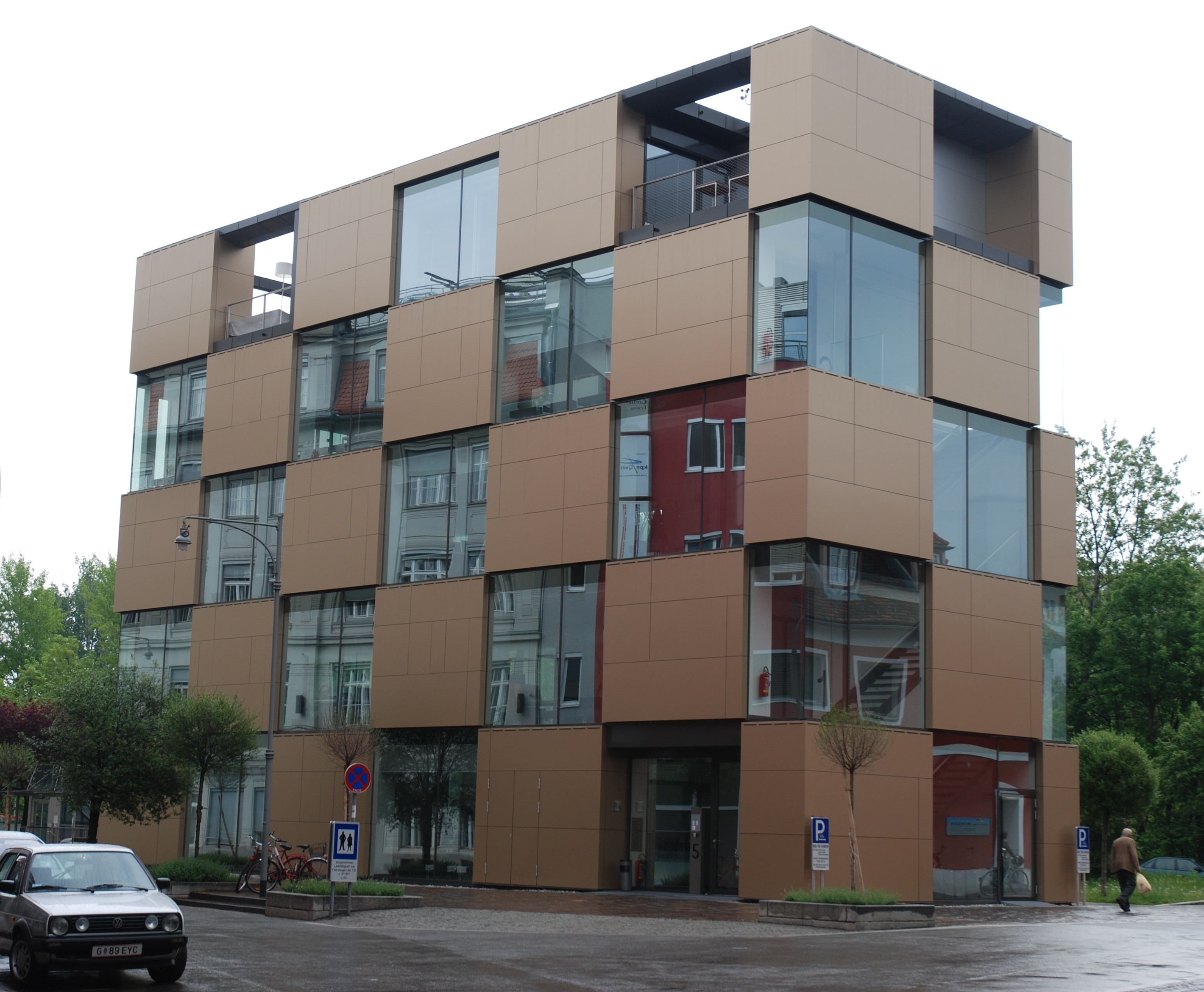
NIK Haus at Nikolaiplatz in Graz Photo: Bengt Oberger

Thomas Pucher (born 1969) is an Austrian architect.

Thomas Pucher was born in Leibnitz in Austria, and trained as an architect in Graz. In 2005 he founded Atelier Thomas Pucher 2005 in Graz.

Pucher and his team won over 30 competitions around the world. Some of his most significant projects are the new Headquarters of the Organisation of Islamic Cooperation, in Jeddah, Saudi Arabia, in 2006 and the Amstetten School Campus in Austria (2009). In 2010, Pucher won the international open competition for the new seat for the Sinfonia Varsovia in Warsaw in Poland and the competition for China North City, Apartments & Shopping Center, in Tianjin, China. In 2011, the team won the international competition for the Tallinn Music and Ballet School in Tallinn, Estonia, the 3rd prize in the invited competition for the Wimmer Medien Business Centre and Urban Development in Linz and the Extension of the Salzburg Regional Hospital, in Austria.

In his earlier career, Pucher won the German award Karl Friedrich Schinkelpreis for Architecture in Berlin, in 1995 and, in 1998, the International UIA Prize of Architects in Barcelona. Together with Alfred Bramberger, he received the Austrian Fischer von Erlach Prize in 2010 for the NIK Office Building in Graz. Also in 2010, he won the Best Architects 11, for Tartu Rebase Street and, in 2012, he won the Best Architects 2012, for the NIK Office Building, in Graz, Austria.
