= Schloss Seggau =

Castle in Austria

Coordinates: 46°46′50″N 15°31′24″E

- Styria, Austria
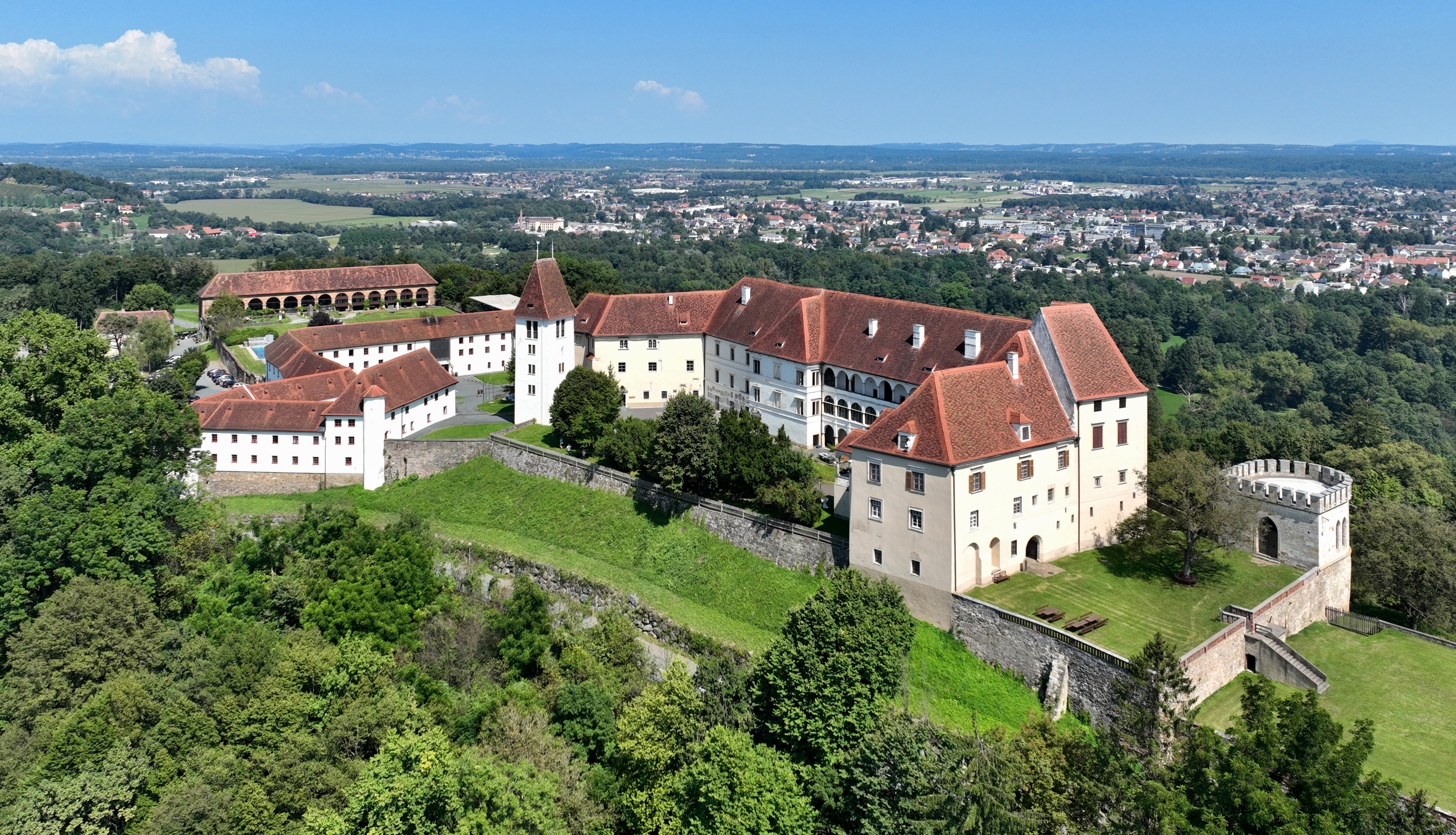

Site information
- Type: Castle
- Open to the public: Hotel (seminars and conferences) and the "Schloss Café"

Site history
- Built: 12th century
- Built by: Archbishopric of Salzburg

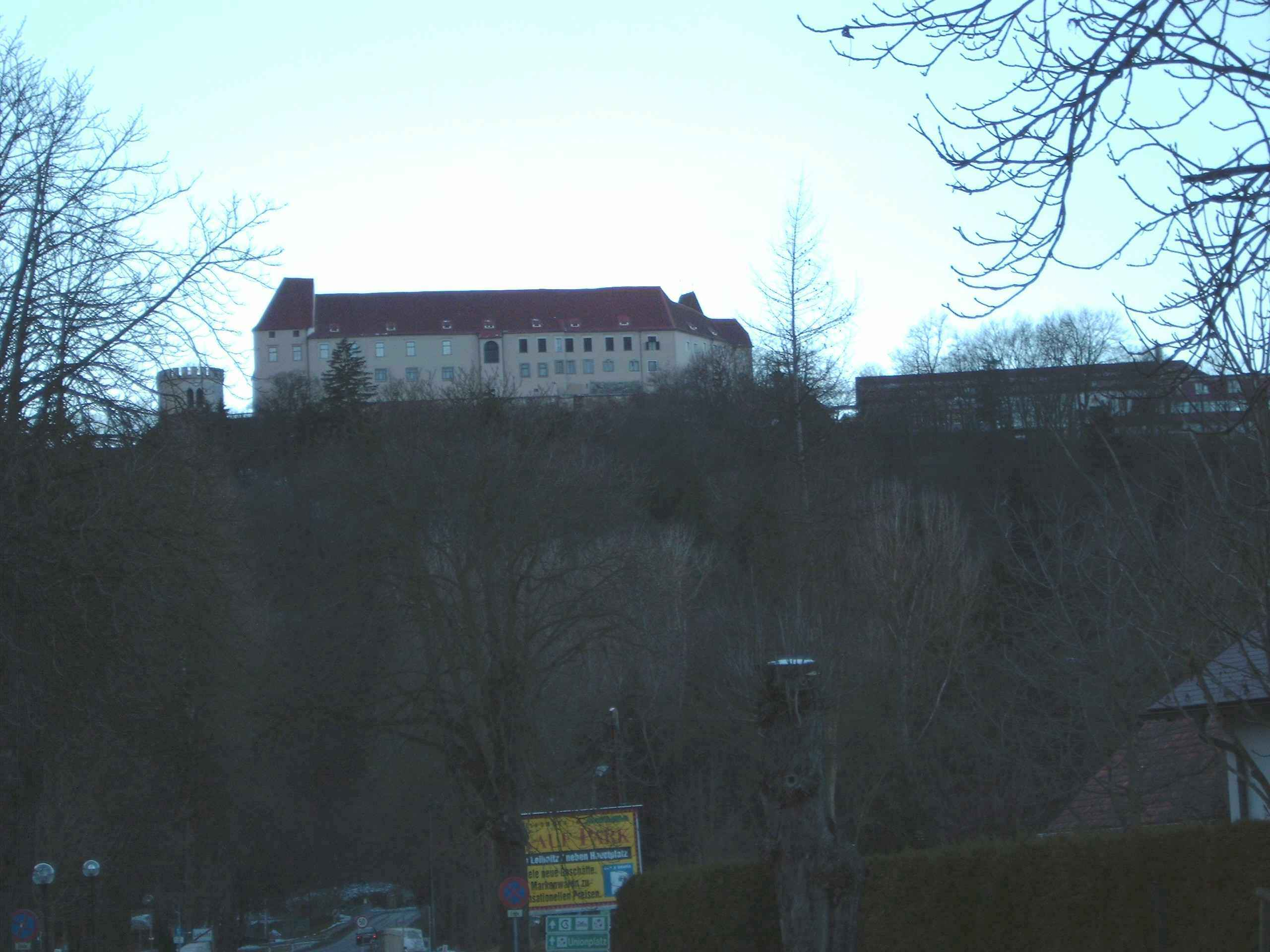
Schloss Seggau near Leibnitz

Schloss Seggau is a castle situated in Seggauberg in southern Styria, Austria. It is located on a wooded hill overlooking the town of Leibnitz. Schloss Seggau is at an elevation of 344 metres (1,129 ft).

== History ==
The area around Schloss Seggau has been settled since at least the Roman era, as demonstrated by the impressive lapidarium which has survived from that period. The upper castle was built by the Archbishopric of Salzburg in the twelfth century as a base for missions and supervision and this original structure was expanded in 1218 by the bishops of Seckau. Over time, a total of three castles were built: Burg Leibnitz (belonging to the Archbishopric of Salzburg), the castle of the bishops of Seckau, and Schloss Polheim. The castles were completed in their present form under Bishop Johann Ernst, Count of Thun, in the latter half of the seventeenth century. Schloss Seggau was the residence of the bishops until 1786, after which it remained their summer residence until into the twentieth century.

Schloss Seggau now serves as a site for seminars and conferences with a hotel and the Schloss Cafe. The wine cellar is over three hundred years old and offers opportunities for wine tastings and sales.

== See also ==
- List of castles in Austria
