= Hershberg =

Hershberg is a surname. Notable people with the surname include:

- Israel Hershberg (born 1948), Israeli painter
- James Hershberg (born 1960), American academic
