= Kozjak Mountains =

Mountain range in Austria and Slovenia

Poßruck / Kozjak
- Location within Austria Location within Slovenia

Highest point
- Peak: Klementkogel
- Elevation: 1,052 m above sea level (AA)

Dimensions
- Length: 36 km (22 mi)

Geography
- State(s): Styria, Austria; Slovenia
- Range coordinates: 46°37′02″N 15°28′34″E
- Parent range: Lavanttal Alps

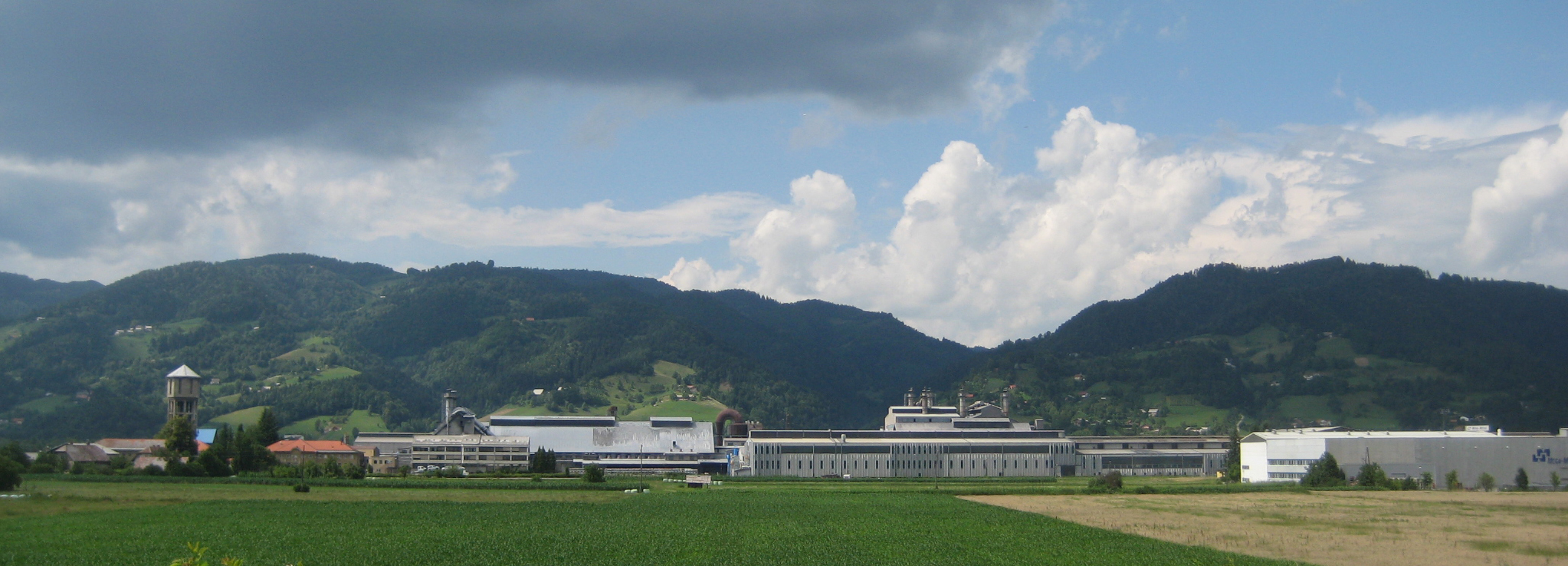
View of the Kozjak Mountains from the south (Ruše)

The Kozjak Mountains (Slovene: Kozjak) or Possruck Mountains (German: Poßruck) is a mountain chain in the Lavanttal or Noric Alps running north of the Drava along the border between the Austrian state of Styria and Slovenia. Its highest peak, the Klementkogel (1,052 m), lies on the border between Austria and Slovenia.

== Topography ==
The mountain range is bounded in the north by the Saggau valley, in the south by the Drava or (called the Drau in Austria) and in the west by the Radl Pass (Slovene: Radelj), whilst in the east it transitions seamlessly near Spielfeld and Leutschach into the Slovene Hills (German: Windische Bühel, Slovene: Slovenske gorice). In the west the Poßruck is also called the Radlkamm. The mountains reach their highest point, 1,052 m, in the Klementkogel (or Kapaunerkogel, Slovene: Kapunar) in the municipality of Großradl in Austria.

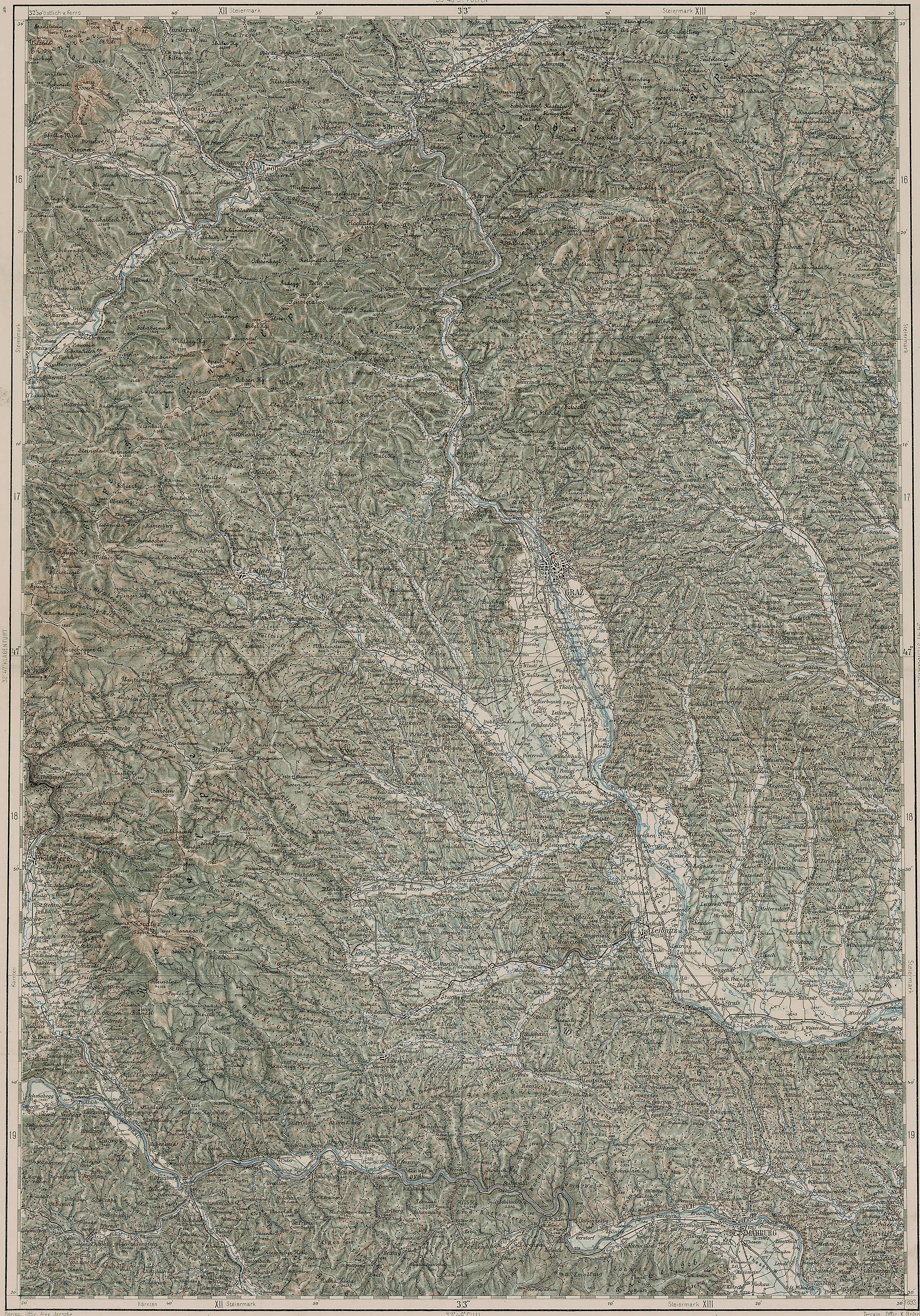
The mountains and the Slovene Hills in the map of Central Europe, Sheet 33°47° Graz (below), 1893.

The main chain of the mountains forms the watershed between the rivers Mur and Drau as well as the national border for much of its length. The border generally follows the boundary between the districts of Leibnitz and Marburg on the one hand and Deutschlandsberg and Windischgraz on the other, that are documented in the map sheets of the current topographic survey. Deviations from this arise from the fact that, in the survey of the border following the Treaty of Saint-Germain in 1919/20, the members of the border demarcation commission sometimes took account of the requests of farmers living on the crest and ensured that their farmsteads were incorporated either into Austria or the Kingdom of Yugoslavia.

== Geology ==
The Possruck is a low mountain range with a complex combination of crystalline, Palaeozoic and Tertiary rocks. Its geology has been extensively researched.

== Transport and tourism ==
In the area of the mountains, the Radlpass Straße, or B76 federal highway, runs over the border between the Austria's West Styria and Slovenia's Lower Styria, crossing over the Radl Pass. In addition several state and local roads, such as that from Langegg in the west to Jurij in the east, from Großwalz to the Kirche zum Heiligen Geist am Osterberg, from Großradl to St. Pankratzen/Sveti Pankraciji, from Oberhaag to Remšnik (Remschnigg), from Arnfels to Kapla (Kappel) and from Schloßberg to Gradišče (Schlossberg).

Because Slovenia is a member of the Schengen Agreement, there have been no border controls since 21 December 2007.

There are three Austrian long-distance footpaths in the mountains:

- South Alpine Way (Südalpenweg, Route 03): traverses the length of the Possruck, the route running close to the national border
- North-South Long-Distance Path (Nord-Süd-Weitwanderweg, Routhe 05): begins at the Radl Pass, the western end of the mountain chain
- Mariazell Way (Mariazeller Weg, Route 06): passes through the area in the vicinity of Eibiswald
