= Berghausen =

Berghausen is the name of several communes:

- Berghausen, Austria, a municipality in Styria, Austria
- Berghausen, Rhineland-Palatinate - a municipality in the Verbandsgemeinde Katzenelnbogen, district Rhein-Lahn, Germany
- a borough of Königswinter, North Rhine-Westphalia
- a part of the municipality Pfinztal
- Berghausen (Bad Berleburg), a former village now part of the town Bad Berleburg, North Rhine-Westphalia, Germany
- Berghausen (Römerberg), a district of Römerberg, Rhineland-Palatinate
- Berghausen (Schmallenberg), a locality in the municipality Schmallenberg, district Hochsauerlandkreis, Germany
