= B76 =

B76 or B-76 may refer to:

- Bundesstraße 76, a road in Germany
- Radl Pass, a road in Austria
- Sicilian Defense, Dragon Variation, according to the Encyclopaedia of Chess Openings
- A postcode district in the United Kingdom covering the western part of Sutton Coldfield, and encompassing the villages of Curdworth, Lea Marston, Minworth, Walmley, and Wishaw
- HLA-B76, an HLA-B serotype
- Benelli B76, a pistol manufactured in Italy by Benelli
