= Leutschach an der Weinstraße =

- Municipality
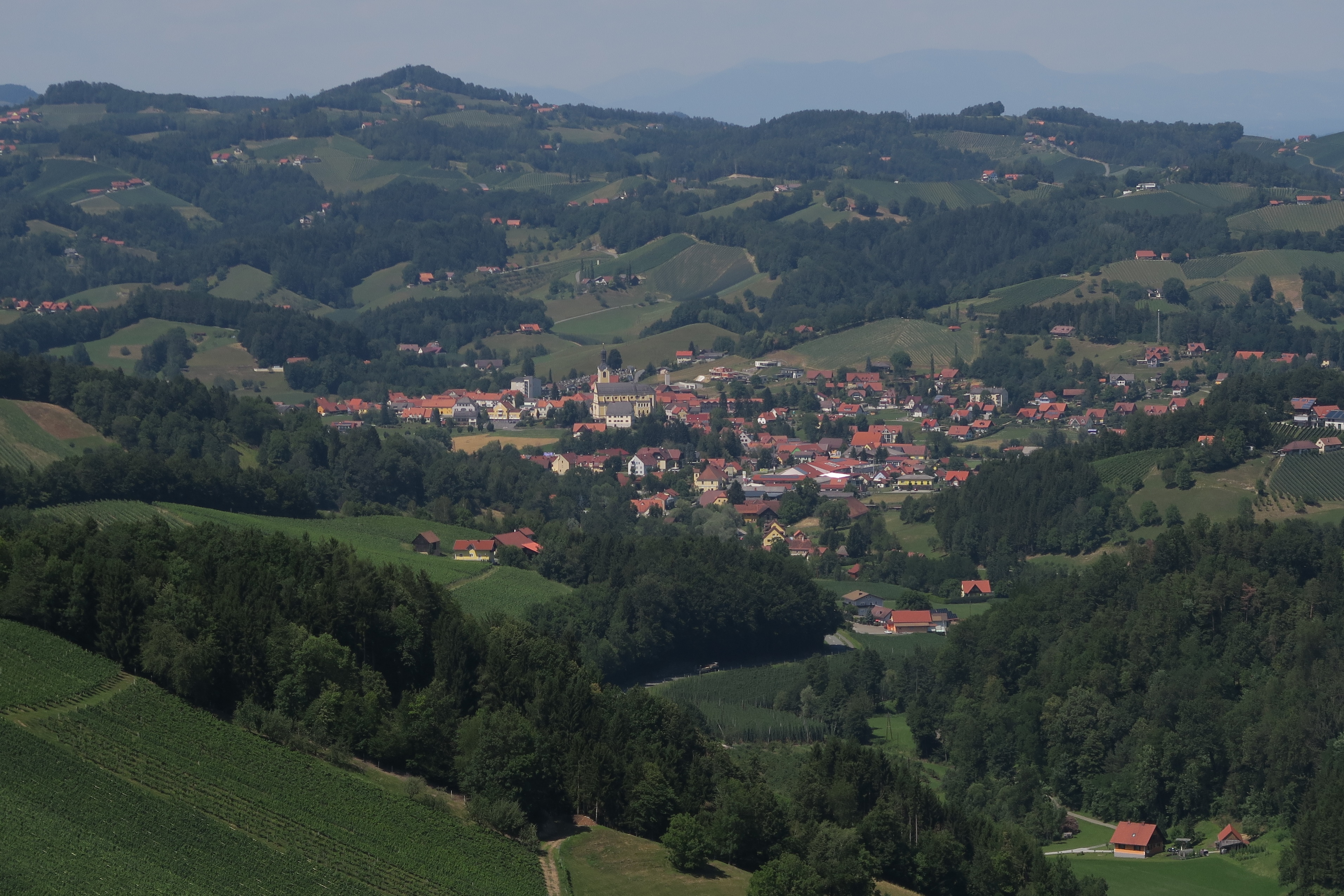
- View of Leutschach an der Weinstraße

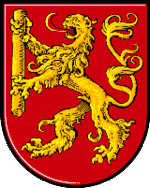
- Coat of arms

- Location within Austria
- Coordinates: 46°40′01″N 15°28′04″E
- Country: Austria
- State: Styria
- District: Leibnitz

Government
  - Mayor: Erich Plasch (ÖVP)

Area
  - Total: 75.64 km^{2} (29.20 sq mi)
- Elevation: 352 m (1,155 ft)

Population (2018-01-01)
  - Total: 3,723
  - Density: 49.22/km^{2} (127.5/sq mi)
- Time zone: UTC+1 (CET)
  - Summer (DST): UTC+2 (CEST)
- Postal code: 8463, 8452, 8453, 8454, 8462
- Area code: 03454
- Website: https://www.leutschach-weinstrasse.gv.at/

Leutschach an der Weinstraße (Austrian German: [ˈlɔʏtʃax an deːɐ̯ ˈvaɪnˌʃtraːsɛ]; Slovene: Lučane na Vinski cesti) is since January 2015 a new municipality with 3,794 residents (as of 1 January 2016) in the Leibnitz District of Styria, Austria.

The municipality was founded as part of the Styria municipal structural reform, on 31 December 2014, from the dissolved independent municipalities Leutschach, Schloßberg, Eichberg-Trautenburg and Glanz an der Weinstraße.

On January 1, 2015, the administration of the new market town, Leutschach an der Weinstraße, moved into the renovated office building, in which all municipal council offices are housed.

The town formed, together with Ehrenhausen an der Weinstraße, Arnfels, Oberhaag and Straß in Steiermark, the tourism agency "Die südsteirische Weinstraße" with base in the town Leutschach an der Weinstraße.

== Geography ==
=== Municipality arrangement ===
The municipal territory includes the following ten sections or like-named Katastralgemeinden (populations as of 1 January 2015,):

- Eichberg-Trautenburg (568; 1,418.13 ha or 3,504.3 acres)
- Fötschach (637; 543.15 ha or 1,342.2 acres)
- Glanz (183; 578.39 ha)
- Großwalz (129; 739.12 ha)
- Kranach (203; 699.66 ha)
- Langegg (88; 89.34 ha)
- Leutschach (557; 111.02 ha)
- Pößnitz (485; 1,194.72 ha or 2,952.2 acres)
- Remschnigg (256; 1,020.92 ha or 2,522.7 acres)
- Schloßberg (672; 1,177.53 ha or 2,909.7 acres)

== History ==
In 1250, the name "Leutschach" was first recorded ("Liubschach"). In 1458 Emperor Frederick III gave the place the market right and the own jurisdiction.

The municipality Leutschach originated in 1850 from the Werbbezirk Trautenburg and was then substantially greater. It was divided in 1882 into the municipalities of Markt Leutschach, Glanz, Schloßberg and Eichberg-Trautenburg. Due to the restructuring of the state of Styria, the autonomy of the four municipalities ended after 132 years.

== Economy ==
Leutschach an der Weinstraße is the largest wine-growing community in Styria and thus an important center of Styrian wine-growing. To this end, tourism, which has grown steadily in recent decades, is the main source of income for the many companies. Leutschach is also the second largest hops cultivation area in Austria. The high-quality hops are processed in the Styrian breweries to be appreciated special beers.

== Politics ==
=== Mayor ===
Erich Plasch was elected mayor of the newly formed municipality in June 2015. Plasch had been until 31 December 2014, mayor of the market town Leutschach. In the transition period, Reinhold Elsnig was government commissioner of the merger.

List of mayors of Leutschach from 1860 to 1882:

- 1850–1852 Josef Ludwig Bayer, Gutsbesitzer zu Amthofen
- 1852–1859 Ignaz Strohmeier
- 1859–1861 Philip Dreu
- 1861–1867 Alois Heu, Kaufmann
- 1867–1870 Ferdinand Hirzer, Bäcker
- 1870–1873 Johann Grabner
- 1873–1876 Alois Kniely, Gastwirt und Bäcker
- 1876–1882 Ferdinand Hirzer, Johann Brand und Johann Zaunschirm
- 1882–1883 Josef Hartnagel, Lederer

=== Municipal council ===
The new municipal council was formed with 21 members. After the election of 2015, the following members were set:

- 17 Mandate ÖVP,
- 2 Mandate SPÖ and
- 2 Mandate FPÖ.

The prior elections had the following results:

Party	2015			2010											
Party	merged town			Leutschach			Eichberg			Glanz			Schloßberg		
Party	Votes	%	Mandate	V.	%	M.	V.	%	M.	V.	%	M.	V.	%	M.
ÖVP	1949	74	17	324	85	8	456	77	7	798	82	13	610	74	11
SPÖ	258	10	2	58	15	1	129	22	2	180	18	2	212	26	4
FPÖ	243	9	2	not running			not running			not running			not running		
Die Grünen	70	3	0	not running			9	2	0	not running			not running		
Bürgerinitiative Rebenland	101	4	0	not running			not running			not running			not running		
Counts	3.174			458			677			1.171			926		
Percentage	83%			85%			88%			86%			90%		

== Culture and sights ==
- Heiligengeistklamm
- Kirche zum Heiligen Geist am Osterberg, unweit der österr. Grenze in Slowenien
- Schloss Trautenburg
- Burgruine Schmirnberg
- Schloßbergwarte am Montikogel

=== Culture and societies ===
Many associations (Musikverein Rebenland Leutschach, Church Choir, Customs associations, Volksstanzkreis) contribute to a good cultural environment. The numerous events include: Thanksgiving parade, carnival procession, church concerts, Advent concerts, Christmas, Corpus Christi procession, Easter procession, church festival or the pilgrimage to the Holy Spirit made on Pentecost Sunday.

== Infrastructure ==
As a residential community, Leutschach an der Weinstraße offers all the important social and economic care facilities. Three general practitioners, a specialist in dentistry, a pharmacy and a branch of the Red Cross provide medical care.

=== Transportation ===
In 1910, a railway was planned to lead from Marburg over the Pössnitzberg that Pößnitz-, Saggau- and Sulmtal by Leibniz. The project failed then by the beginning of the First World War.

In terms of traffic, the individual cadastral communities and localities are today largely developed by the individual traffic (271.7 km or 168.8 mi of common roads). Public buses connect Leutschach with neighboring municipalities and the district capital of Leibnitz. The nearest train stations are in Ehrenhausen and Leibnitz.

== Education ==
The educational institutions of the greater community include: two kindergartens (Leutschach and Langegg), the childcare facility "Lachtraube", two elementary schools (Leutschach and Langegg), and the NMS Leutschach.

== Notable residents ==
- Nicos Jaritz (born 1953), percussionist and bandleader
- Konrad Jarz (1842–1909), adventurer, historian and geographer
- Franz Unger (1800–1870), an Austrian botanist, paleontologist and plant physiologist
