= Retznei =

- Former municipality
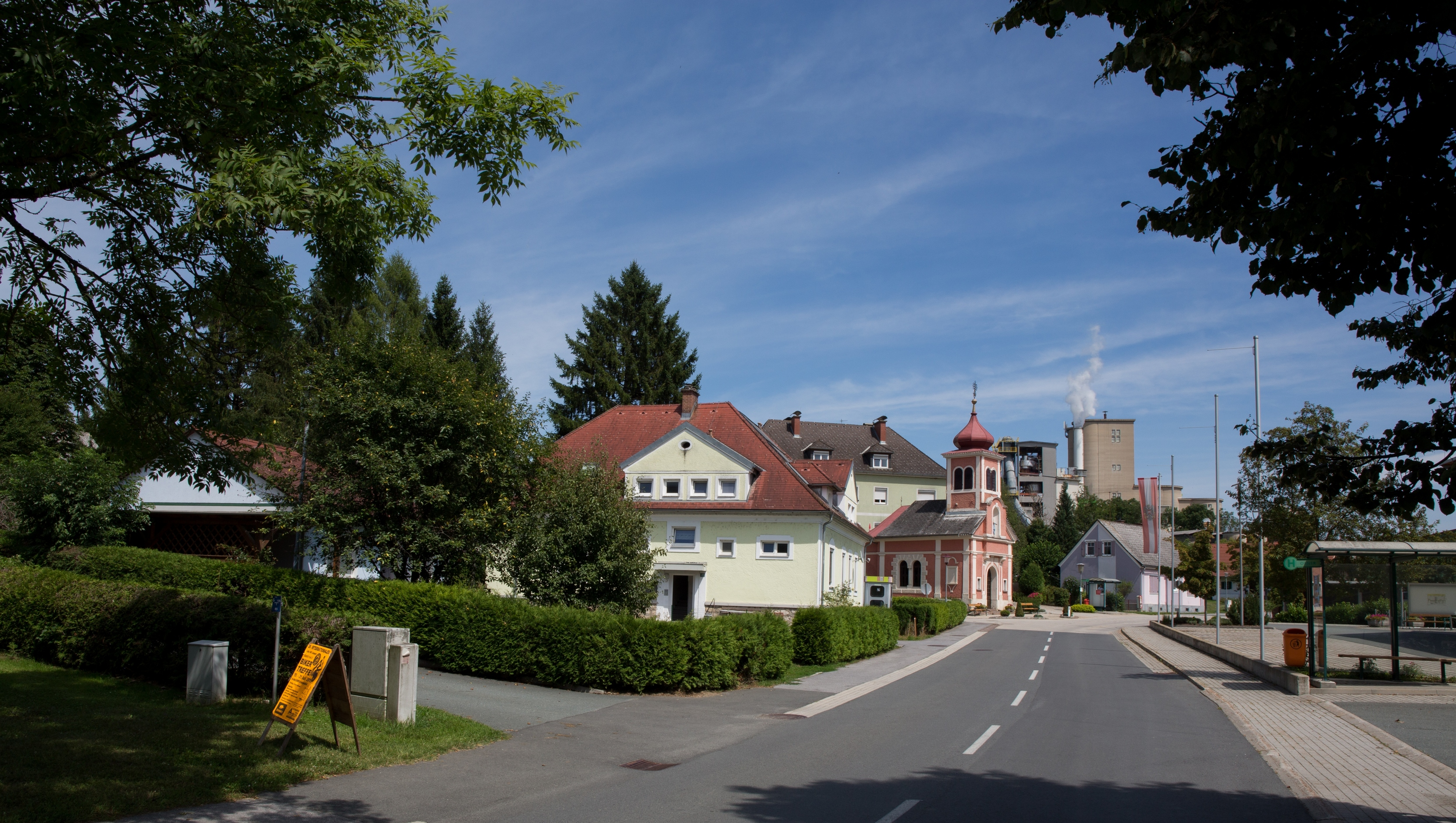
- Street in Retznei

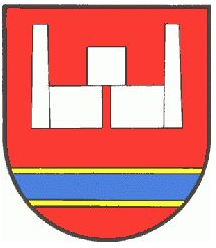
- Coat of arms

- Location within Austria
- Coordinates: 46°44′14″N 15°34′10″E
- Country: Austria
- State: Styria
- District: Leibnitz

Area
  - Total: 3.34 km^{2} (1.29 sq mi)
- Elevation: 261 m (856 ft)

Population (1 January 2016)
  - Total: 427
  - Density: 128/km^{2} (331/sq mi)
- Time zone: UTC+1 (CET)
  - Summer (DST): UTC+2 (CEST)
- Postal code: 8461
- Area code: 03453
- Vehicle registration: LB
- Website: Website Retznei

Retznei is a former municipality in the district of Leibnitz in the Austrian state of Styria. Since the 2015 Styria municipal structural reform, it is part of the municipality Ehrenhausen an der Weinstraße.

== Geography ==
Retznei lies on the right bank of the Mur river below its confluence with the Sulm about 6 km southeast of Leibnitz.
