= Franz Unger =

Austrian botanist and paleonthologist

Franz Joseph Andreas Nicolaus Unger
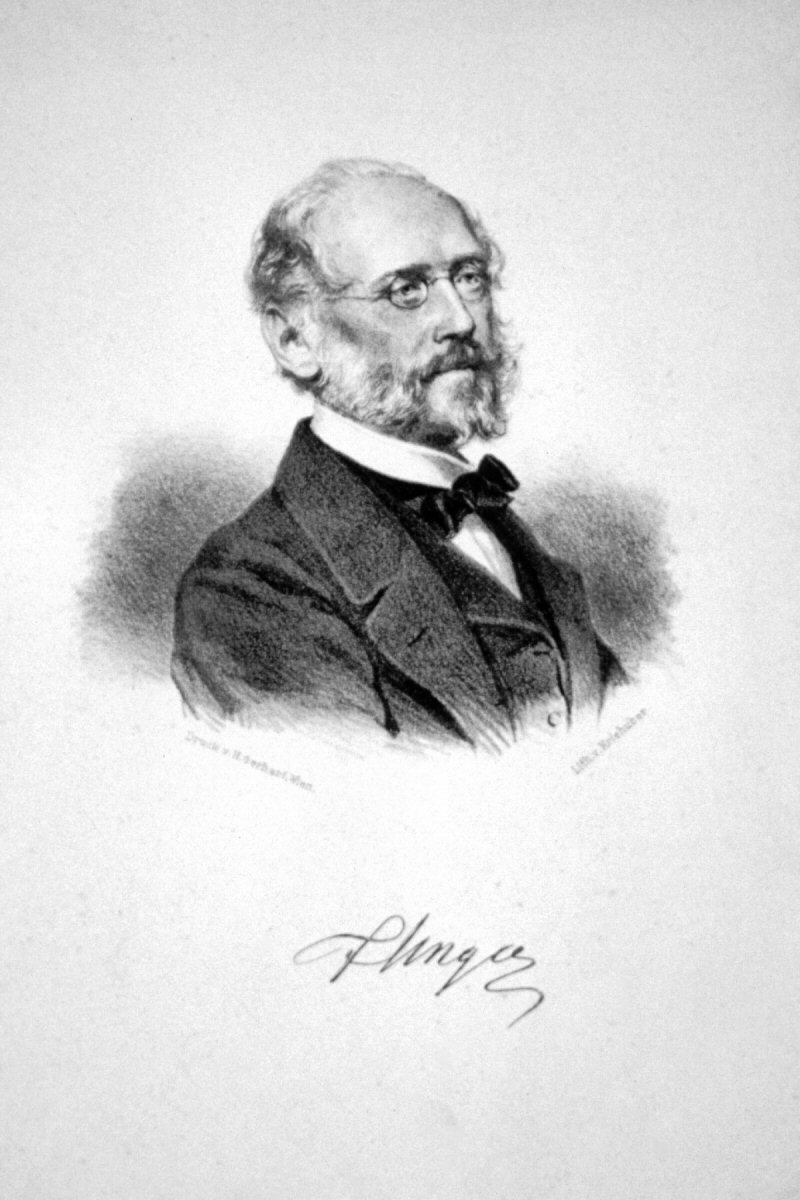
- Franz Unger, lithograph by Josef Kriehuber
- Born: 30 November 1800; Leutschach, Austria
- Died: 13 February 1870 (aged 69); Graz, Austria
- Known for: paleontology phytotomy
- Scientific career
- Workplaces: University of Graz; University of Vienna; Charles University

Franz Joseph Andreas Nicolaus Unger (30 November 1800 in Gut Amthof near village Leutschach in Styria, Austria – 13 February 1870 in Graz) was an Austrian botanist, paleontologist and plant physiologist.

== Life and work ==
Initially, Unger studied law at the University of Graz. In 1820 he moved to Vienna to study medicine, in 1822 he enrolled at the Charles University in Prague. In 1823 Unger returned to Vienna and completed his medical studies in 1827.

From 1827 Unger practiced as a doctor in Stockerau near Vienna, then from 1830 as a court physician in Kitzbühel, Tyrol. In 1836 he was named professor of botany at the University of Graz and also taught at the Joanneum (which became the Universalmuseum Joanneum and the Graz University of Technology); in 1850 professor of plant physiology in Vienna. In 1852 he travelled to Northern Europe and to the Orient. Unger retired in 1866 and lived on his farm near Graz.

Unger was one of the major contributors to the field of paleontology, later turning to plant physiology and phytotomy. He hypothesized that (then unknown) combinations of simple elements inside a plant cell determine plant heredity and greatly influenced the experiments of his student Gregor Johann Mendel. Unger was a pioneer in documenting the relationships between soil and plants (1836).

Unger is notable for proposing a theory of evolution before Charles Darwin. Unger accepted the transmutation of species. During his time his ideas were widely criticized by those who held religious views. In his book Attempt of a History of the Plant World (1852) he devoted a chapter to the evolution of plants.

== Works ==
- Über den Einfluß des Bodens auf die Verteilung der Gewächse. 1836.
- Über den Bau und das Wachstum des Dikotyledonenstamms. 1840.
- Über Kristallbildungen in den Pflanzenzellen. 1840.
- Grundzüge der Anatomie und Physiologie der Pflanzen. 1846.
- Anatomie und Physiologie der Pflanzen. 1855.
- Grundlinien der Anatomie und Physiologie der Pflanzen. 1866.
- Synopsis plan tarum fossilium. 1845.
- Chloris protogaea, Beiträge zur Flora der Vorwelt. 1841–1847.
- Genera et species plantarum fossilium. 1850.
- Iconographia plantarum fossilium. 1852.
- Sylloge plantarum fossilium. 1860.
- Die Urwelt in ihren verschiedenen Bildungsperioden. 1851, 3rd edition 1864. (With some of the earliest drawings of prehistoric animals.)
- Versuch einer Geschichte der Pflanzenwelt. 1852.
- Geologie der europäischen Waldbäume. 1870.
- Wissenschaftliche Ergebnisse einer Reise in Griechenland und den Ionischen Inseln. 1862.
- Die Insel Cypern. 1865.
- Botanische Briefe. 1852.
- Botanische Streifzüge auf dem Gebiet der Kulturgeschichte.

== Sources ==
- "Dr. Franz Unger", Journal of Anthropology, Vol. 1, No. 2 (Oct., 1870), pp. 227–232. JSTOR link
- German Wikipedia article lists several German language sources.
