= Ratsch an der Weinstraße =

- Former municipality
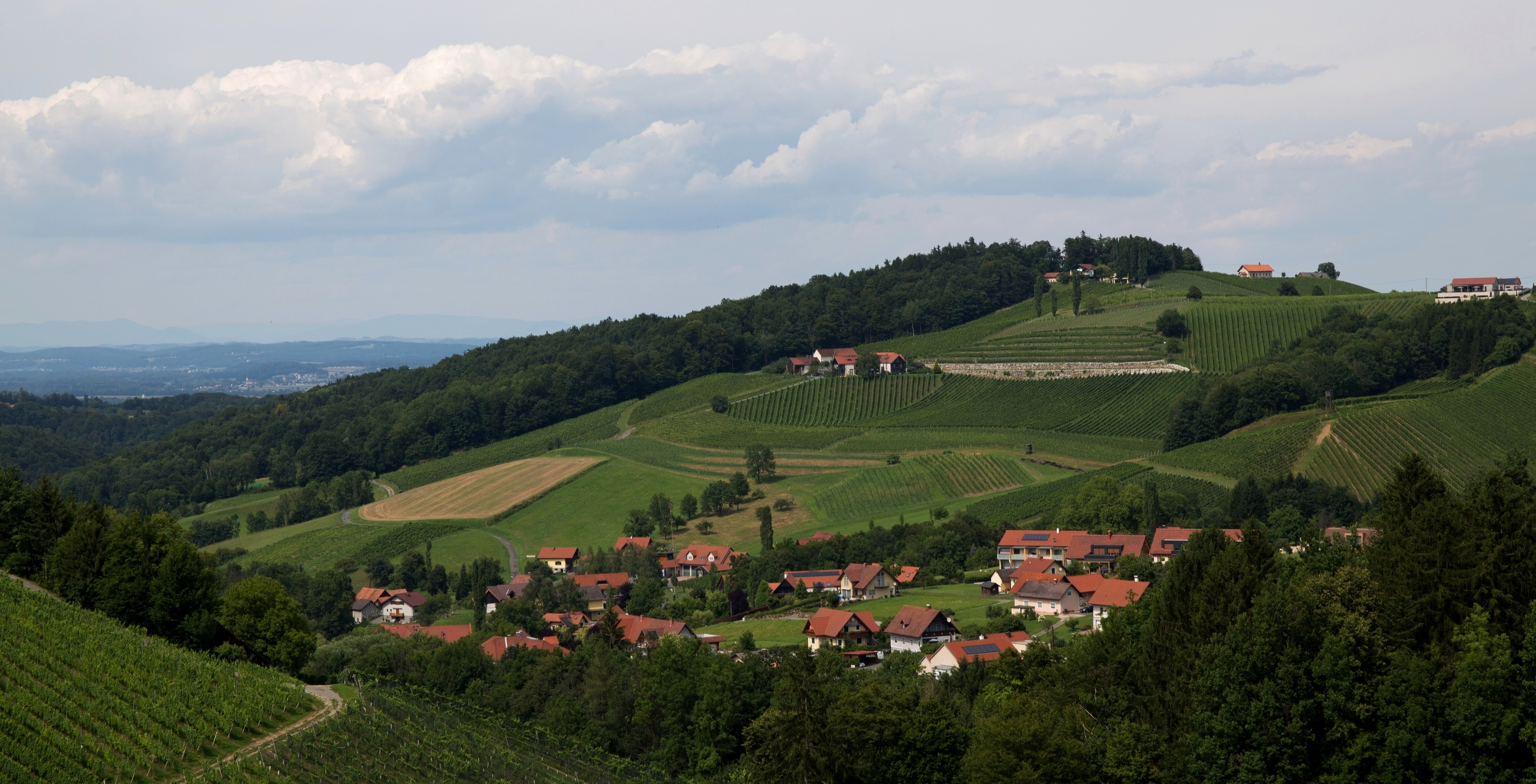

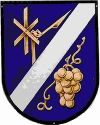
- Coat of arms

- Location within Austria
- Coordinates: 46°42′00″N 15°34′12″E
- Country: Austria
- State: Styria
- District: Leibnitz
- Elevation: 352 m (1,155 ft)

Population (1 January 2016)
  - Total: 445
- Time zone: UTC+1 (CET)
  - Summer (DST): UTC+2 (CEST)
- Postal code: 8461
- Area code: 03453
- Vehicle registration: LB
- Website: www.ratsch-weinstrasse.at

Ratsch an der Weinstraße (Slovene: Račane) is a former municipality in the district of Leibnitz in the Austrian state of Styria. Since the 2015 Styria municipal structural reform, it is part of the municipality Ehrenhausen an der Weinstraße.

== Geography ==
Ratsch lies in south Styria on the Slovenian border.
