= Eichberg-Trautenburg =

- Former municipality
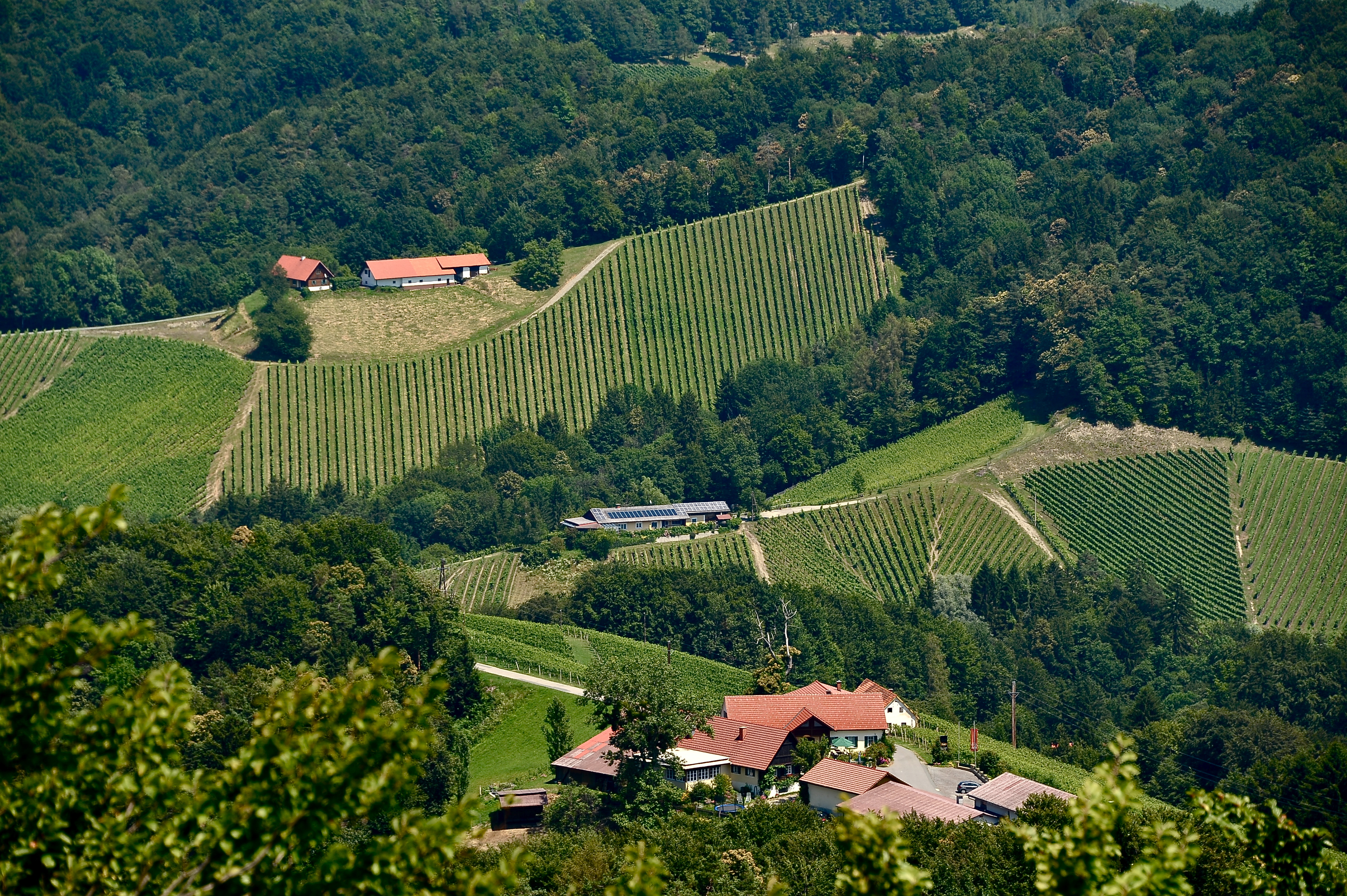
- View from the observation tower Kreuzbergwarte (Eichberg-Trautenburg) on Hoehenweg-Karnerberg at Kranach

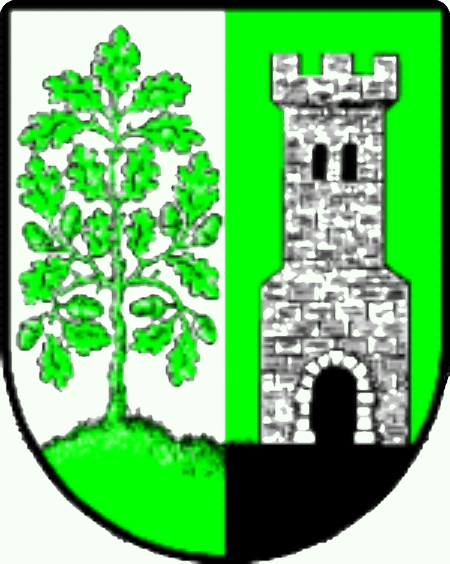
- Coat of arms

- Location within Austria
- Coordinates: 46°42′00″N 15°26′00″E
- Country: Austria
- State: Styria
- District: Leibnitz

Area
  - Total: 21.2 km^{2} (8.2 sq mi)
- Elevation: 480 m (1,570 ft)

Population (1 January 2016)
  - Total: 773
  - Density: 36.5/km^{2} (94.4/sq mi)
- Time zone: UTC+1 (CET)
  - Summer (DST): UTC+2 (CEST)
- Postal code: 8452, 8453, 8454, 8463
- Area code: 03454
- Vehicle registration: LB
- Website: www.eichberg-trautenburg.at

Eichberg-Trautenburg is a former municipality in the district of Leibnitz in the Austrian state of Styria. Since the 2015 Styria municipal structural reform, it is part of the municipality Leutschach an der Weinstraße.

== Population ==
Historical population
Year	Pop.	±%
1869	1,131	—
1880	1,164	+2.9%
1890	1,141	−2.0%
1900	1,161	+1.8%
1910	1,173	+1.0%
1923	1,102	−6.1%
1934	1,242	+12.7%
1939	1,157	−6.8%
1951	1,183	+2.2%
1961	1,106	−6.5%
1971	1,015	−8.2%
1981	992	−2.3%
1991	897	−9.6%
2001	886	−1.2%
2011	787	−11.2%
