= Ehrenhausen an der Weinstraße =

- Municipality
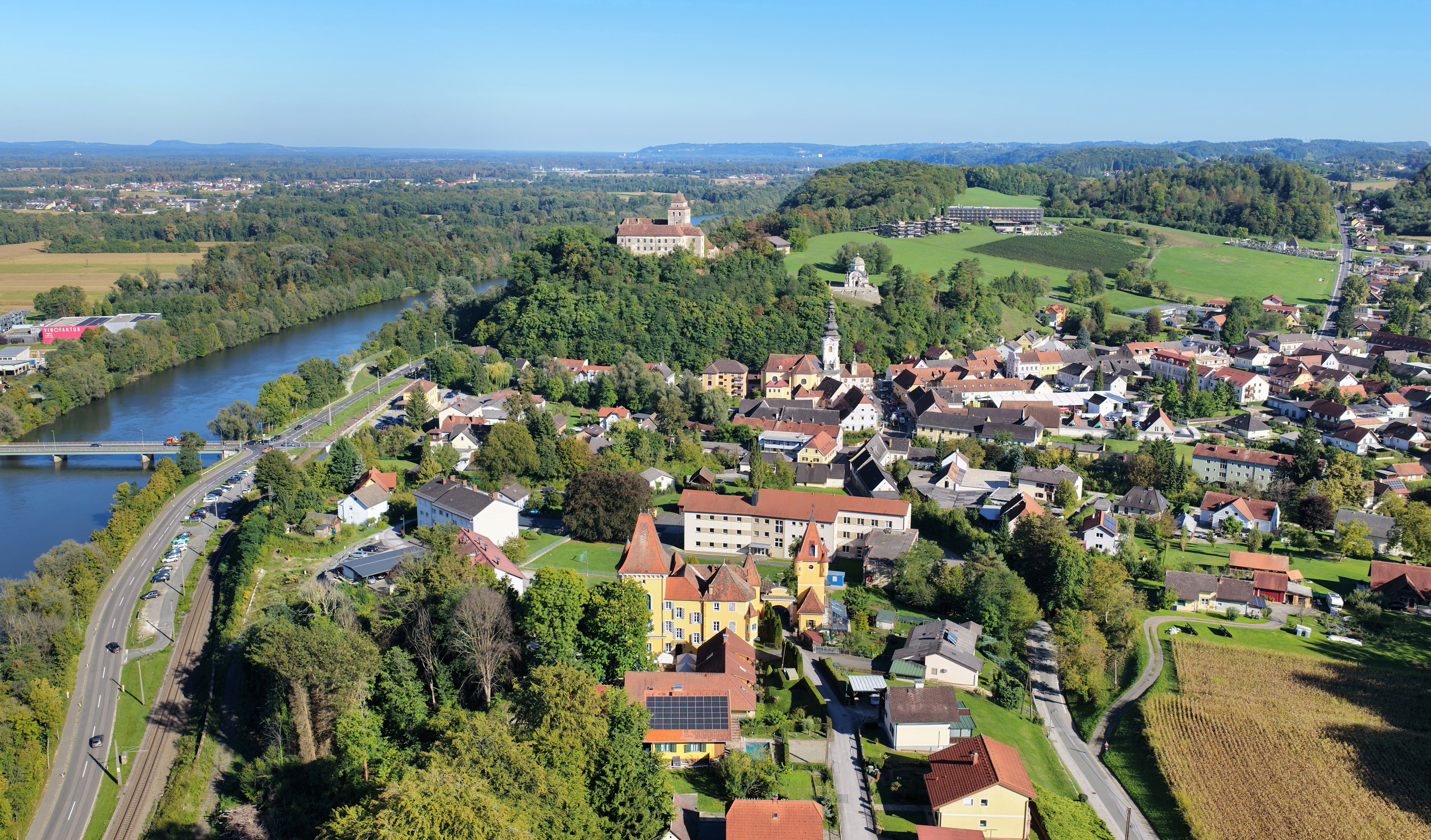
- West-northwest view of Ehrenhausen

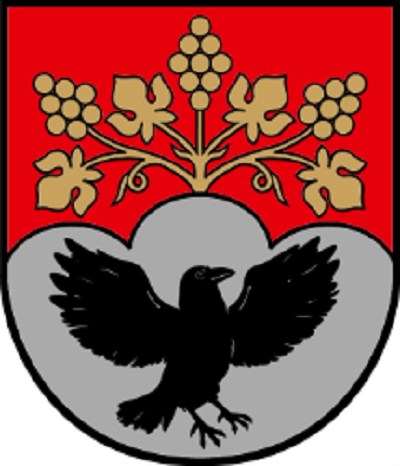
- Coat of arms

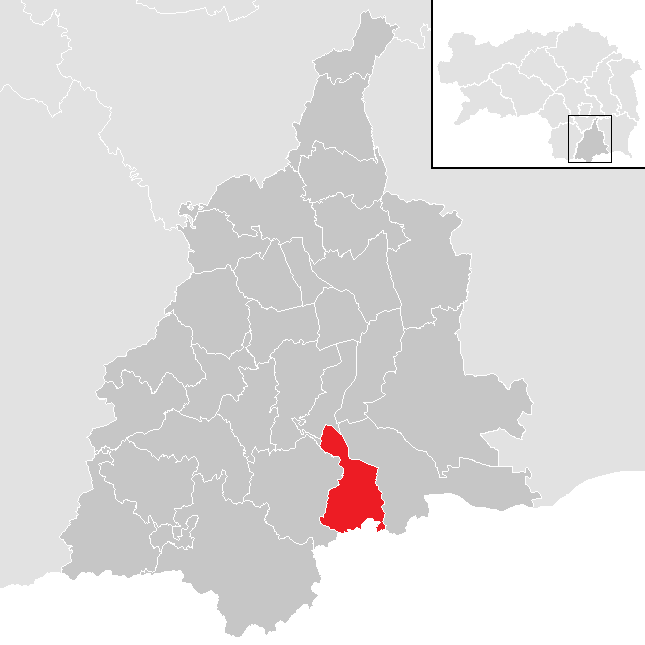
- Location within Leibnitz district

- Location within Austria
- Coordinates: 46°43′35″N 15°35′04″E
- Country: Austria
- State: Styria
- District: Leibnitz

Government
  - Mayor: Martin Wratschko (ÖVP)

Area
  - Total: 20.25 km^{2} (7.82 sq mi)
- Elevation: 258 m (846 ft)

Population (2018-01-01)
  - Total: 2,558
  - Density: 126.3/km^{2} (327.2/sq mi)
- Time zone: UTC+1 (CET)
  - Summer (DST): UTC+2 (CEST)
- Postal code: 8461
- Area code: 03453
- Website: https://www.ehrenhausen-gv.at/

Ehrenhausen an der Weinstraße is a municipality with 2,623 residents (as of 1 January 2016) in the Leibnitz District of Styria, Austria.

The municipality, Ehrenhausen an der Weinstraße, was formed as part of the Styria municipal structural reform, at the end of 2014, by merging the former towns Ehrenhausen, Berghausen, Ratsch an der Weinstraße and Retznei.

The municipality formed with Arnfels, Leutschach an der Weinstraße, Oberhaag and Straß in Steiermark, the tourism agency "Die südsteirische Weinstraße" based in Leutschach an der Weinstraße.

== Geography ==
=== Municipality arrangement ===
The municipality territory includes the following eight sections (populations as of 2015):

- Ehrenhausen (1,101)
- Ewitsch (393)
- Ottenberg (110)
- Ratsch an der Weinstraße (328)
- Retznei (382)
- Unterlupitscheni (28)
- Wielitsch (217)
- Zieregg (16)

The municipality consists of seven Katastralgemeinden (areas 2015):

- Ehrenhausen (305.64 ha or 755.3 acres)
- Ewitsch (223.00 ha or 551.0 acres)
- Ottenberg (279.38 ha)
- Ratsch (550.59 ha)
- Retznei (153.95 ha)
- Unterlupitscheni (177.08 ha)
- Wielitsch (340.97 ha or 842.6 acres)

== Demographics ==
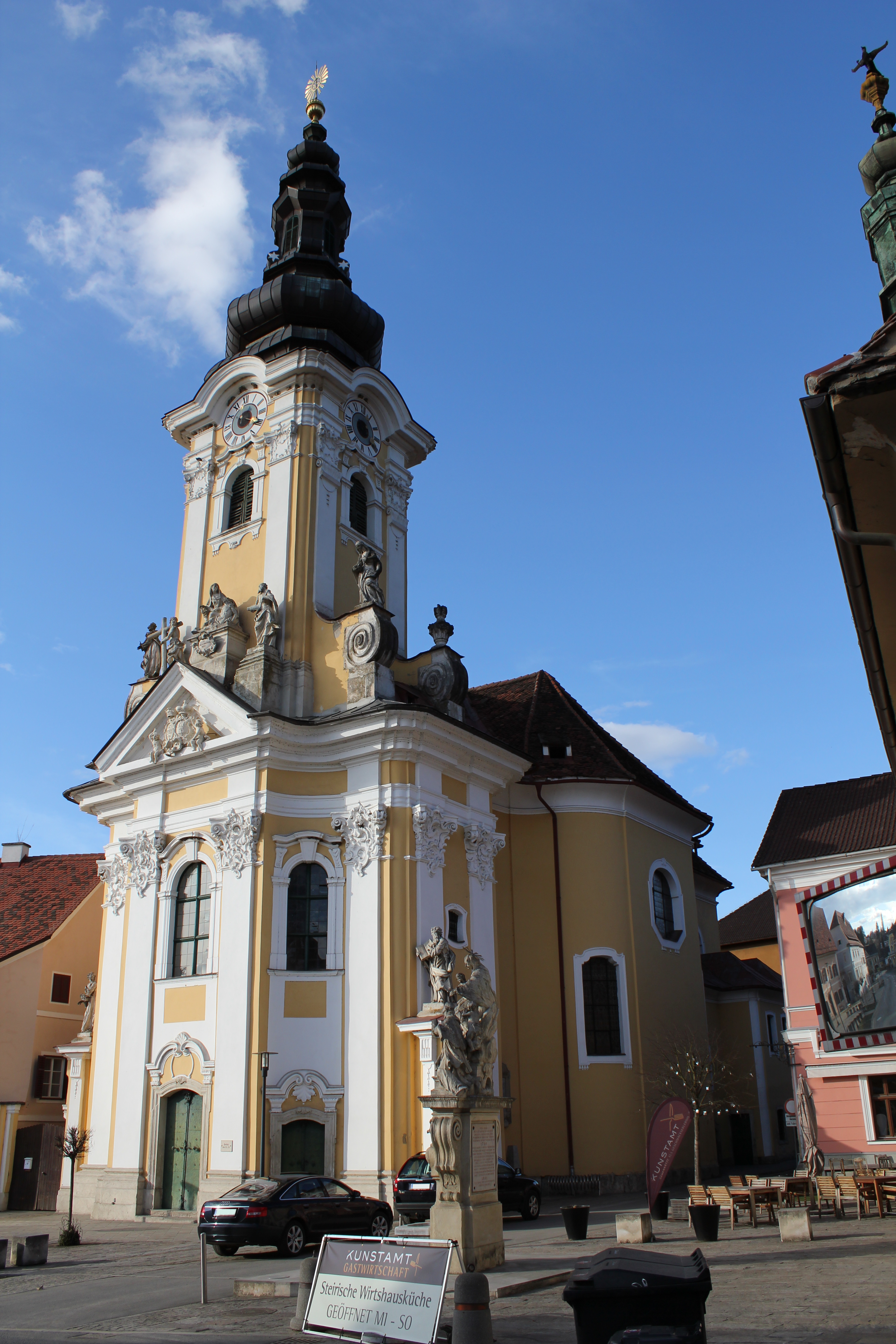
Pfarr- and Wallfahrtskirche church of Ehrenhausen

== Politics ==
=== Mayor ===
Martin Wratschko (ÖVP) was elected in the constituent session of the town council on 16 April 2015 as Bürgermeister. Wratschko was until the end of 2014, the mayor of the former municipality Ehrenhausen.

The municipality also includes: vice-mayor Johannes Zweytick (ÖVP) and town treasurer Detlef Gruber (SPÖ). Zweytick was, before 1 January 2015, the commissioner at the start of the newly merged municipality.

=== Municipal council ===
The municipal council consists of 15 members. After the results of the 2015 election, the council convened with the following:

- 8 Mandate ÖVP
- 6 Mandate SPÖ
- 1 Mandat FPÖ

The last election brought the following results:

Partei	2015			2010											
Partei	Großgemeinde			Ehrenhausen			Berghausen			Ratsch			Retznei		
Partei	Stimmen	%	Mandate	St.	%	M.	St.	%	M.	St.	%	M.	St.	%	M.
ÖVP	905	54	8	545	73	11	301	68	6	219	70	7	91	32	3
SPÖ	616	37	6	185	25	4	140	32	3	92	30	2	185	64	6
FPÖ	119	7	1	14	2	0	not candidate			not candidate			11	4	0
Die Grünen	44	3	0	not candidate			not candidate			not candidate			not candidate		
Wahlberechtigte	2,158			880			549			348			347		
Wahlbeteiligung	79%			86%			82%			93%			84%		

== Gallery ==
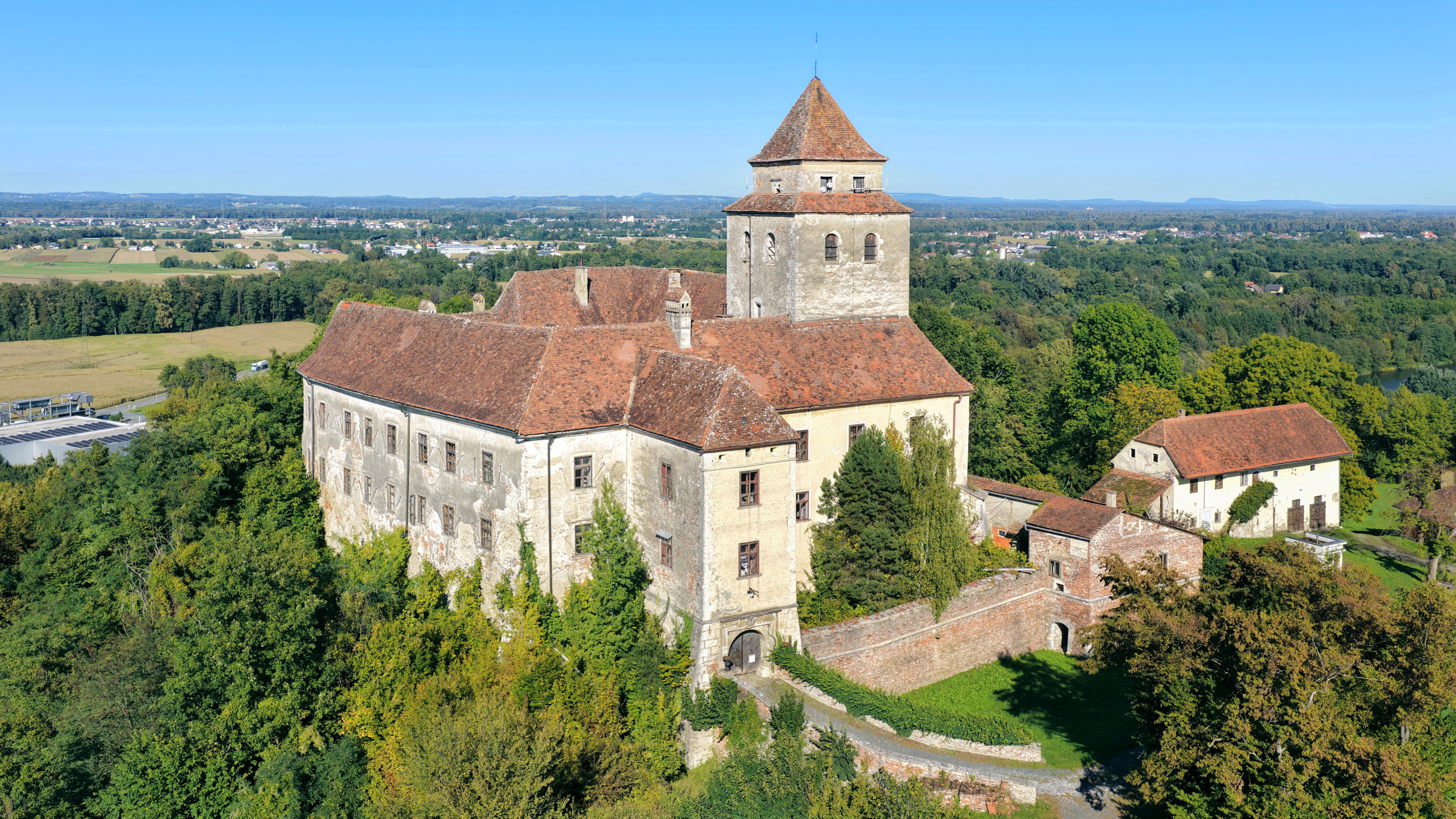
Schloss Ehrenhausen

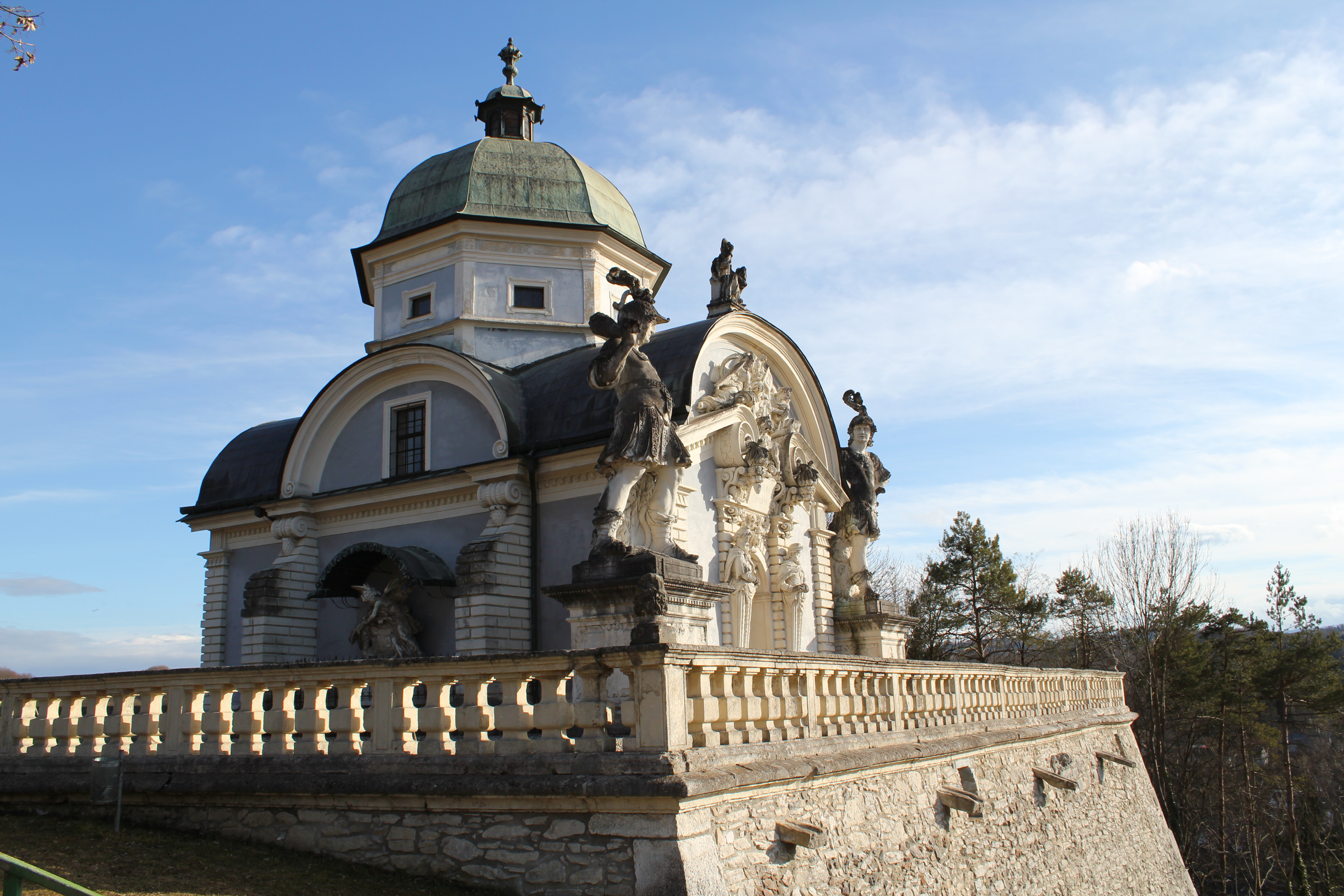
Mausoleum des Ruprecht von Eggenberg in Ehrenhausen

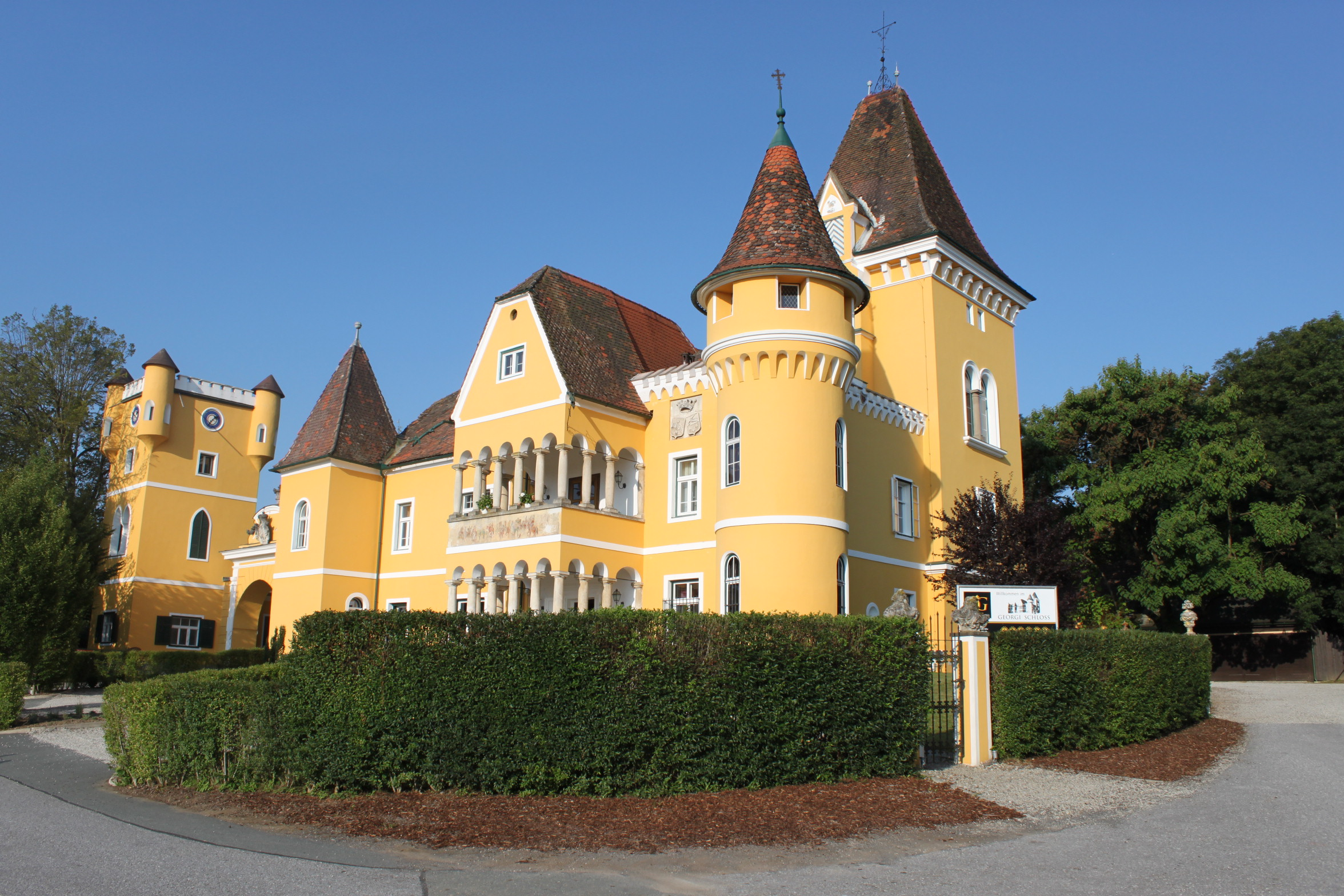
Georgischlössl in Ehrenhausen

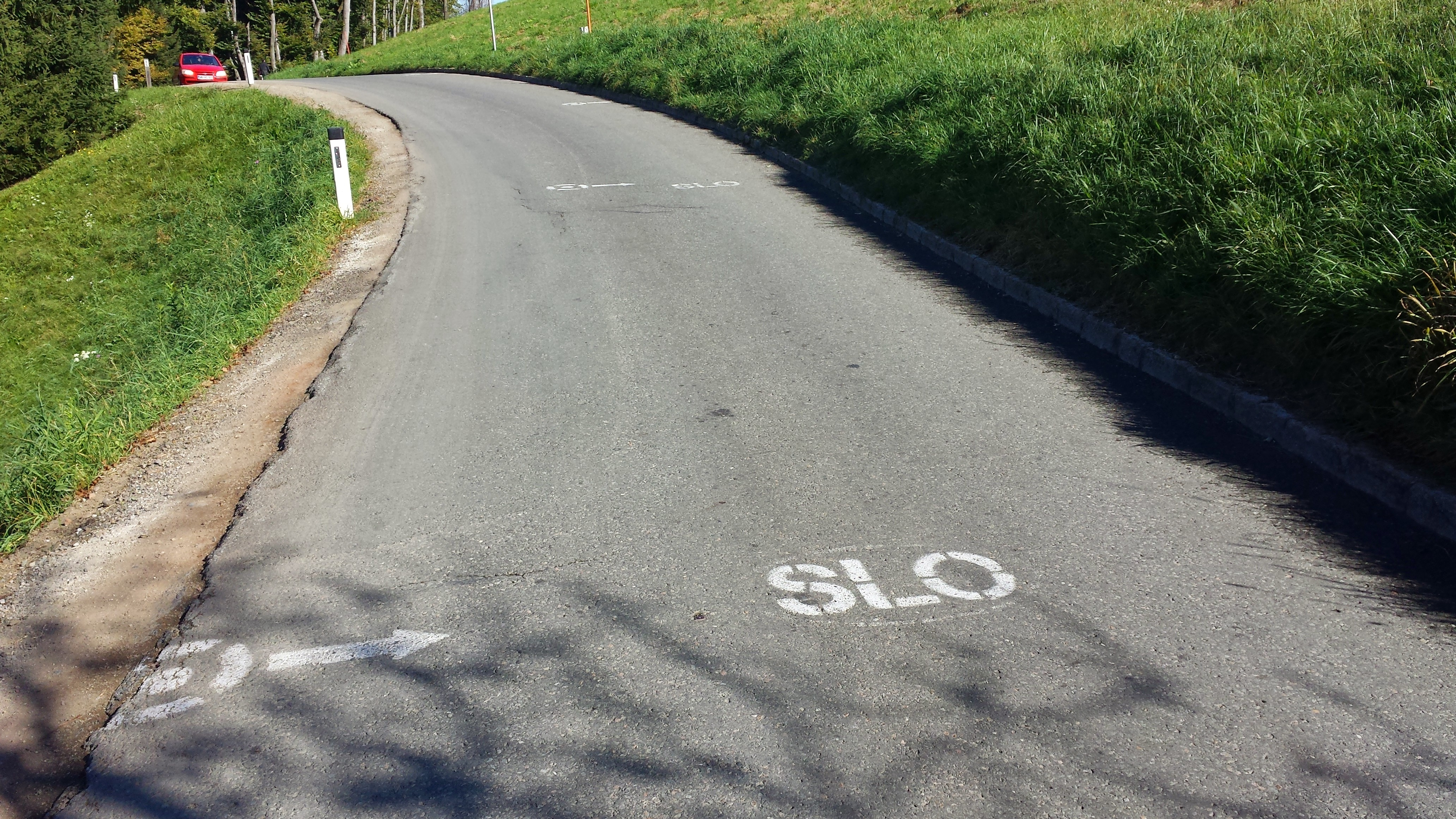
The South Styrian wine route (Grenzland-Weinstraße) straddles the border of Austria and Slovenia (the white markings indicate the border).
