= Großradl =

- Former municipality
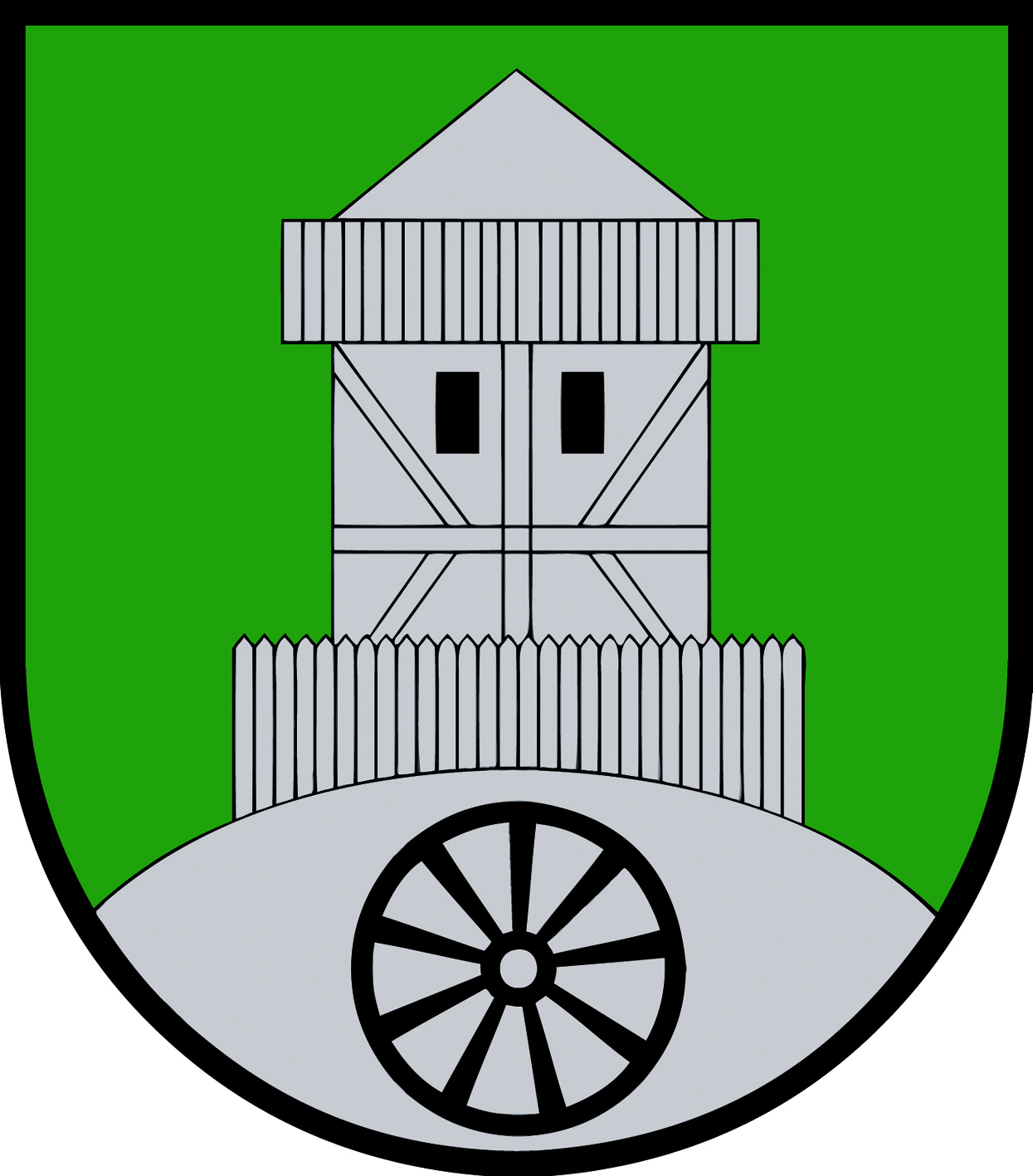
- Coat of arms

- Location within Austria
- Coordinates: 46°41′10″N 15°15′52″E
- Country: Austria
- State: Styria
- District: Deutschlandsberg

Area
  - Total: 32.00 km^{2} (12.36 sq mi)
- Elevation: 520 m (1,710 ft)

Population (2014-01-01)
  - Total: 1,397
  - Density: 43.66/km^{2} (113.1/sq mi)
- Time zone: UTC+1 (CET)
  - Summer (DST): UTC+2 (CEST)
- Postal code: 8552
- Area code: 3466
- Vehicle registration: DL
- Website: grossradl.gv.at

Großradl was a municipality in Austria.
