= Berghausen, Styria =

Berghausen
- Former municipality
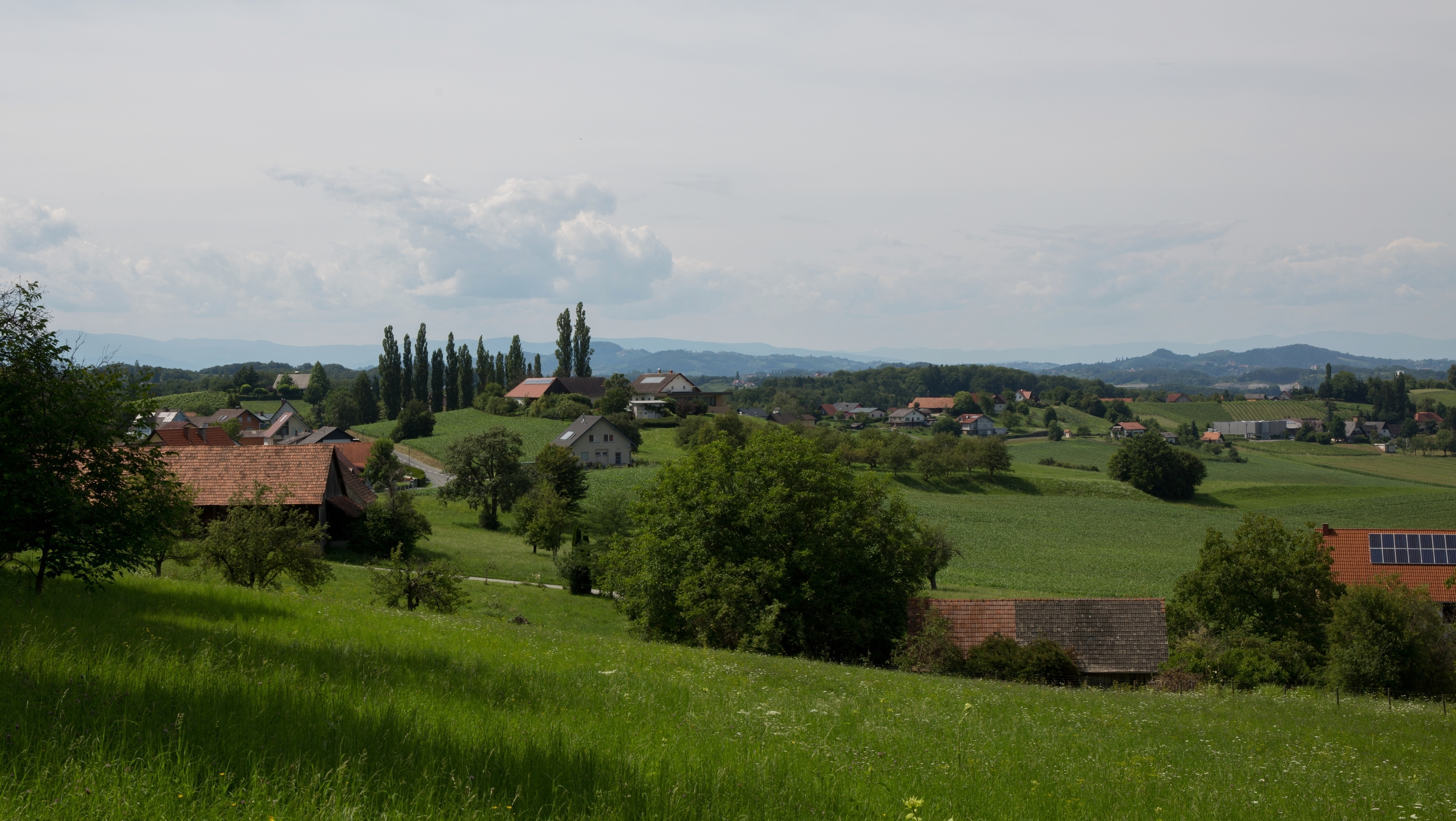
- View of Berghausen

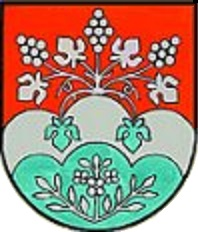
- Coat of arms

- Location within Austria
- Coordinates: 46°42′27″N 15°35′50″E
- Country: Austria
- State: Styria
- District: Leibnitz

Area
  - Total: 5.63 km^{2} (2.17 sq mi)
- Elevation: 350 m (1,150 ft)

Population (1 January 2016)
  - Total: 632
  - Density: 112/km^{2} (291/sq mi)
- Time zone: UTC+1 (CET)
  - Summer (DST): UTC+2 (CEST)
- Postal code: 8461
- Area code: 03453
- Vehicle registration: LB
- Website: www.berghausen.at

Berghausen is a former municipality in the district of Leibnitz in the Austrian state of Styria. Since the 2015 Styria municipal structural reform, it is part of the municipality Ehrenhausen an der Weinstraße.

== Geography ==
Berghausen lies on the eastern end of the South Styrian Weinstraße, a wine route on the border of Slovenia.
