= Glanz an der Weinstraße =

- Former municipality
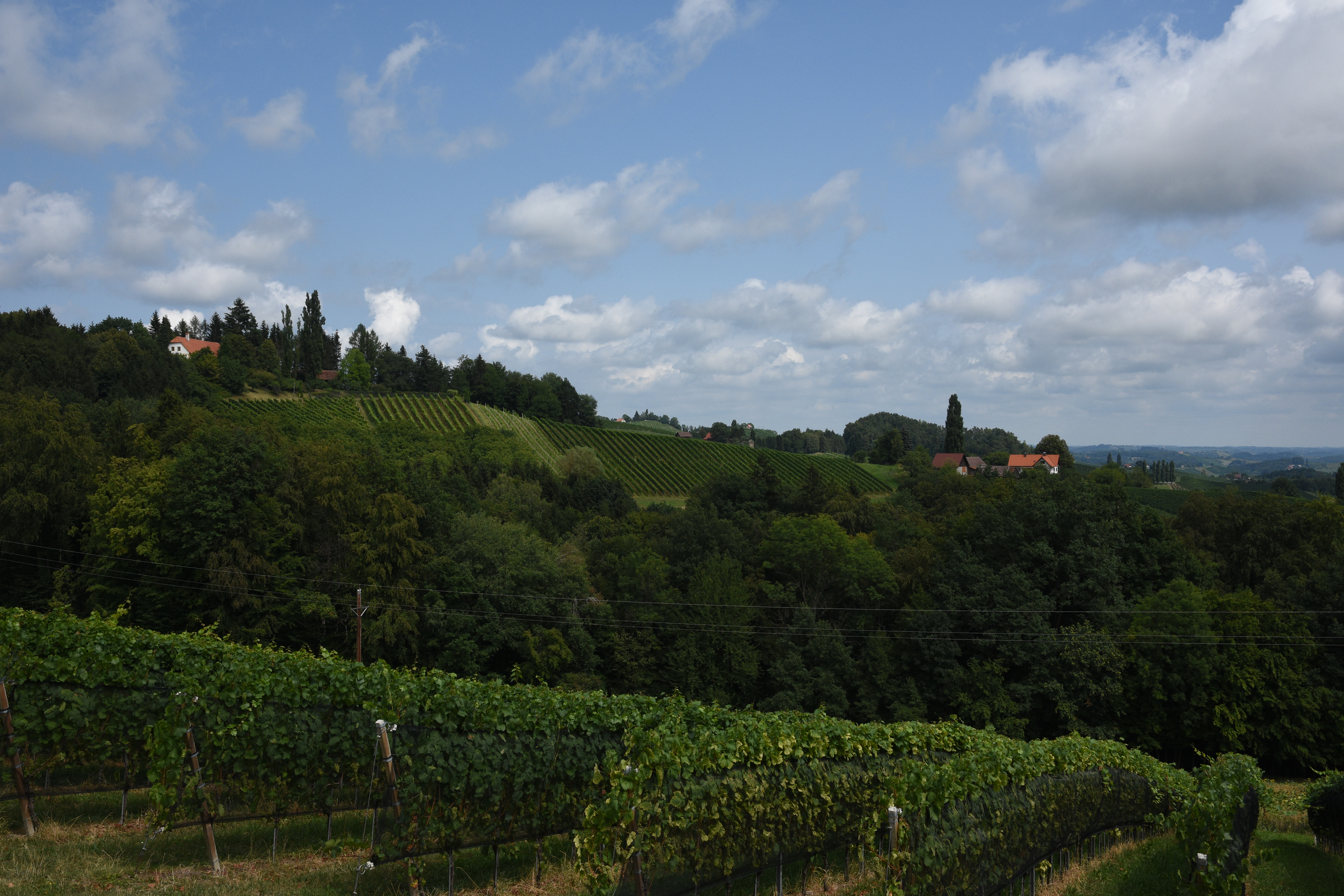
- Glanz an der Weinstraße landscape

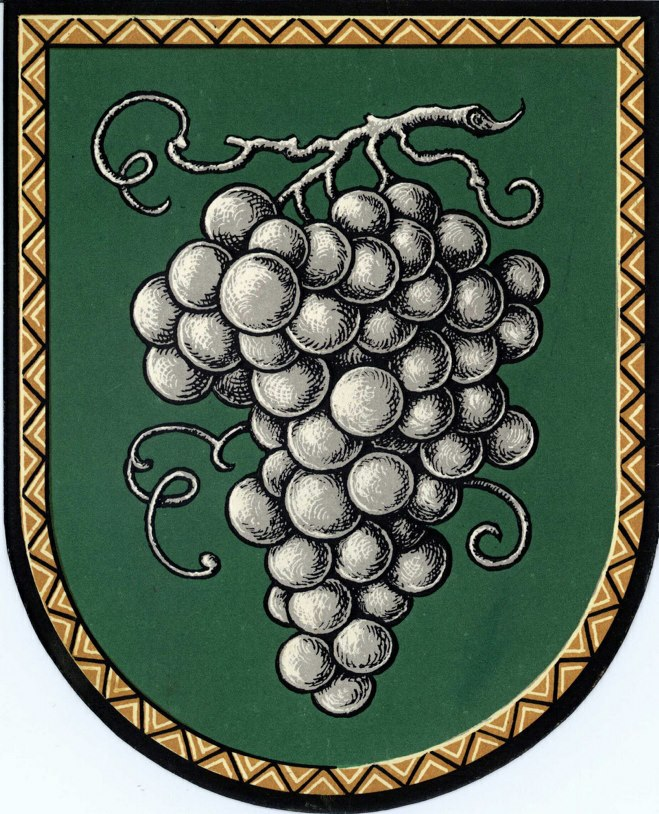
- Coat of arms

- Location within Austria
- Coordinates: 46°39′00″N 15°28′48″E
- Country: Austria
- State: Styria
- District: Leibnitz

Area
  - Total: 23.98 km^{2} (9.26 sq mi)
- Elevation: 440 m (1,440 ft)

Population (1 January 2016)
  - Total: 1,395
  - Density: 58.17/km^{2} (150.7/sq mi)
- Time zone: UTC+1 (CET)
  - Summer (DST): UTC+2 (CEST)
- Postal code: 8463
- Area code: 03454
- Vehicle registration: LB
- Website: www.glanz-weinstrasse.gv.at

Glanz an der Weinstraße (Slovene: Klanc) is a former municipality in the district of Leibnitz in the Austrian state of Styria. Since the 2015 Styria municipal structural reform, it is part of the municipality Leutschach an der Weinstraße. Before World War One, it had a Slovene ethnic majority: according to the 1910 census, 56% of the population were Slovene speakers.

== Population ==
Historical population
Year	Pop.	±%
1869	2,037	—
1880	2,008	−1.4%
1890	2,023	+0.7%
1900	1,924	−4.9%
1910	1,948	+1.2%
1923	1,945	−0.2%
1934	2,102	+8.1%
1939	2,061	−2.0%
1951	2,977	+44.4%
1961	2,047	−31.2%
1971	1,644	−19.7%
1981	1,509	−8.2%
1991	1,541	+2.1%
2001	1,376	−10.7%
2011	1,498	+8.9%
