= Schloßberg (Leibnitz) =

- Former municipality
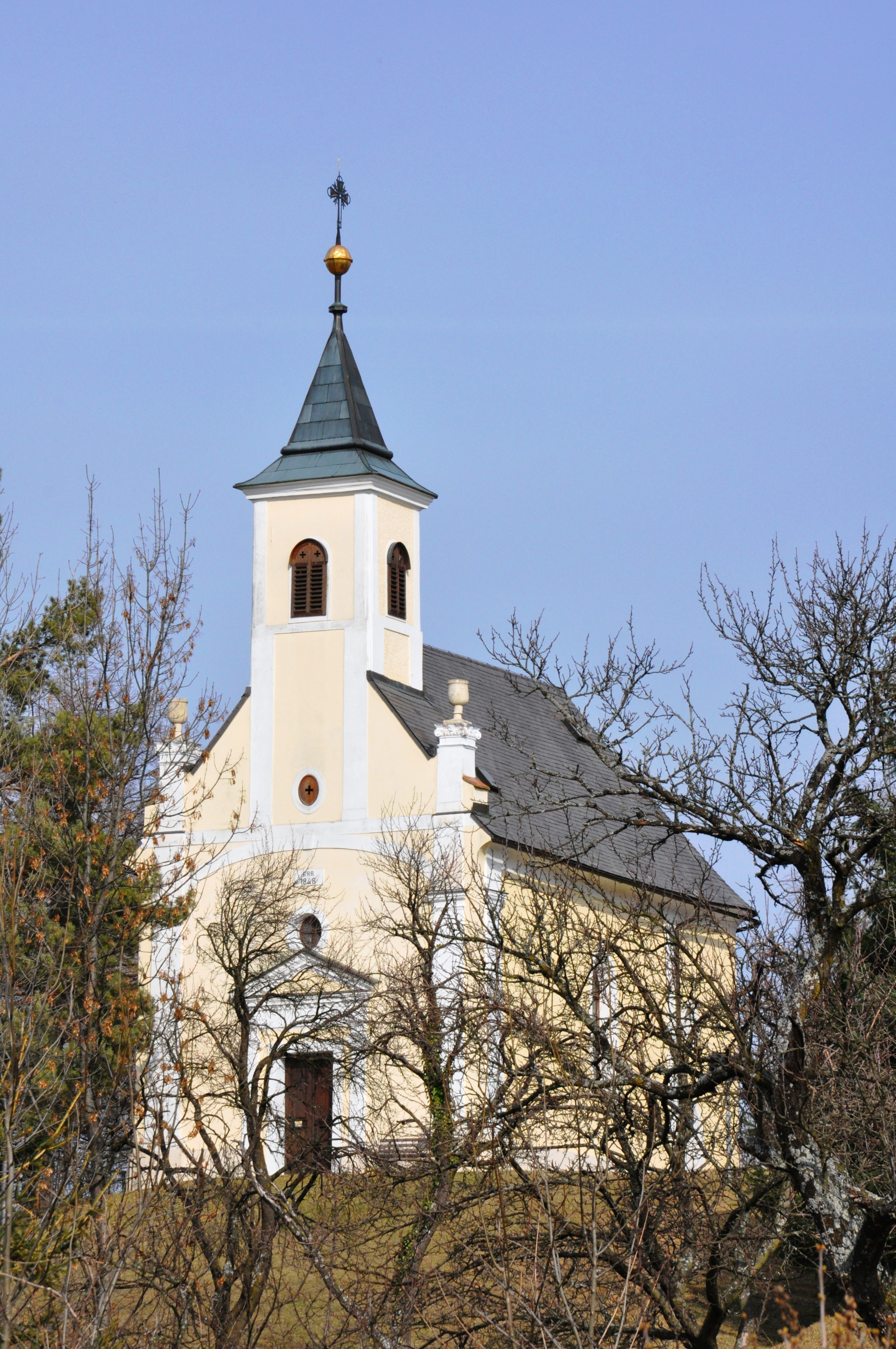
- Chapel in Schloßberg

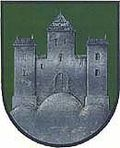
- Coat of arms

- Location within Austria
- Coordinates: 46°37′12″N 15°28′12″E
- Country: Austria
- State: Styria
- District: Leibnitz

Area
  - Total: 29.31 km^{2} (11.32 sq mi)
- Elevation: 346 m (1,135 ft)

Population (1 January 2016)
  - Total: 1,076
  - Density: 36.71/km^{2} (95.08/sq mi)
- Time zone: UTC+1 (CET)
  - Summer (DST): UTC+2 (CEST)
- Postal code: 8463
- Area code: 03454
- Vehicle registration: LB
- Website: www.schlossberg. steiermark.at

Schloßberg (Slovene: Gradišče) is a former municipality in the district of Leibnitz in the Austrian state of Styria. Since the 2015 Styria municipal structural reform, it is part of the municipality Leutschach an der Weinstraße. Before World War One, it had an ethnic Slovene majority: according to census of 1910, 50.2% of the population was Slovene speaking, and 49.8% was German speaking.

== Population ==
Historical population
Year	Pop.	±%
1869	1,832	—
1880	1,698	−7.3%
1890	1,769	+4.2%
1900	1,784	+0.8%
1910	1,786	+0.1%
1923	1,677	−6.1%
1934	1,828	+9.0%
1939	1,719	−6.0%
1951	1,715	−0.2%
1961	1,543	−10.0%
1971	1,520	−1.5%
1981	1,318	−13.3%
1991	1,350	+2.4%
2001	1,212	−10.2%
2012	1,069	−11.8%
