= Leutschach =

Leutschach Lučane
- Former municipality
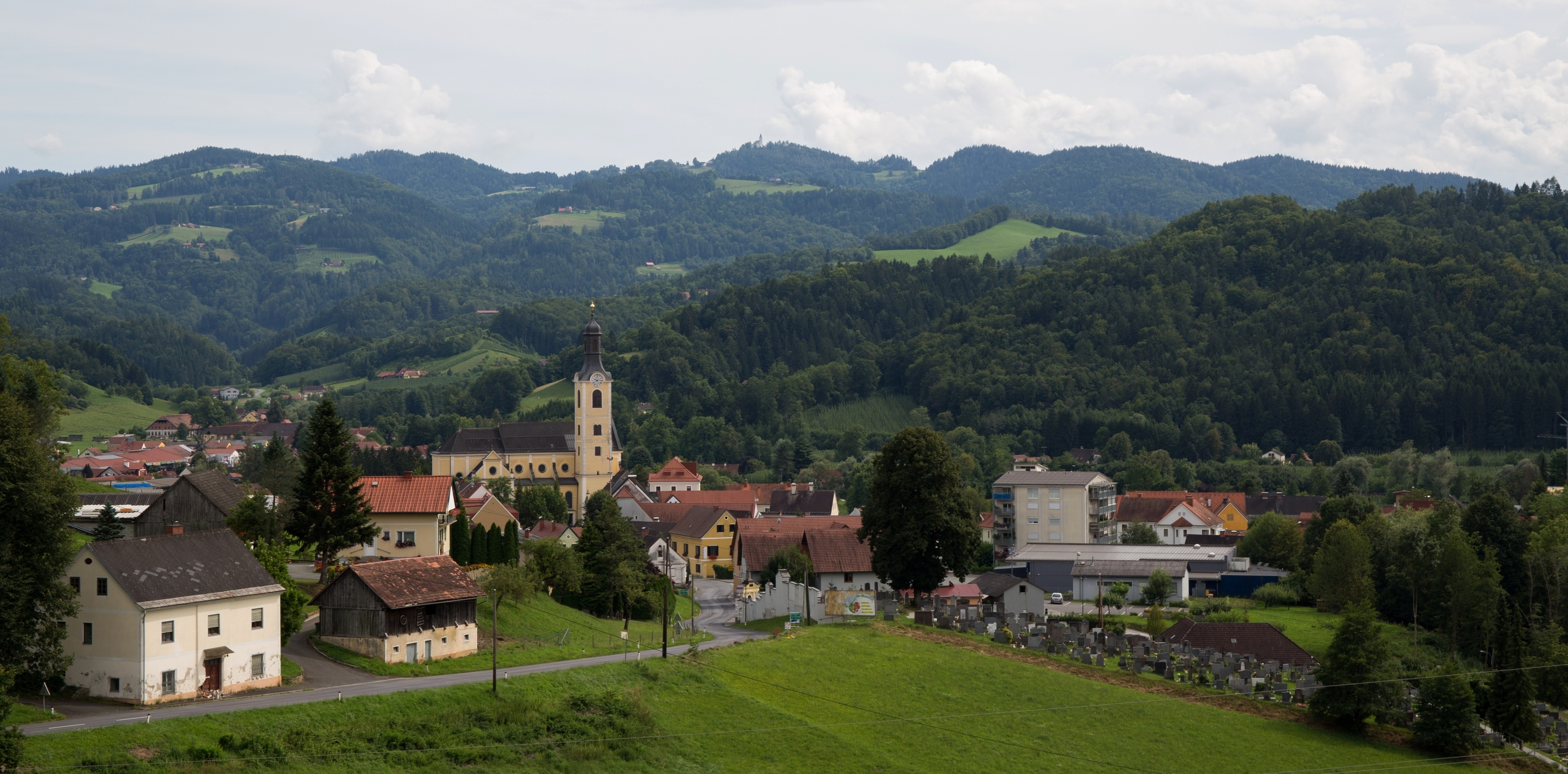

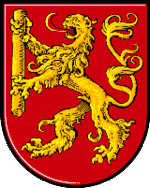
- Coat of arms

- Location within Austria
- Coordinates: 46°40′0″N 15°28′0″E
- Country: Austria
- State: Styria
- District: Leibnitz

Area
  - Total: 1.1 km^{2} (0.42 sq mi)
- Elevation: 352 m (1,155 ft)

Population (1 January 2016)
  - Total: 567
  - Density: 520/km^{2} (1,300/sq mi)
- Time zone: UTC+1 (CET)
  - Summer (DST): UTC+2 (CEST)
- Postal code: 8463
- Area code: 03454
- Vehicle registration: LB
- Website: www.leutschach. steiermark.at

Leutschach (Slovene: Lučane) is a former municipality in the district of Leibnitz in Austrian state of Styria. Since the 2015 Styria municipal structural reform, it is part of the municipality Leutschach an der Weinstraße.

== Population ==
Historical population
Year	Pop.	±%
1869	531	—
1880	548	+3.2%
1890	562	+2.6%
1900	521	−7.3%
1910	573	+10.0%
1923	530	−7.5%
1934	564	+6.4%
1939	561	−0.5%
1951	593	+5.7%
1961	501	−15.5%
1971	543	+8.4%
1981	515	−5.2%
1991	540	+4.9%
2001	627	+16.1%
2011	645	+2.9%
