= Radl Pass =

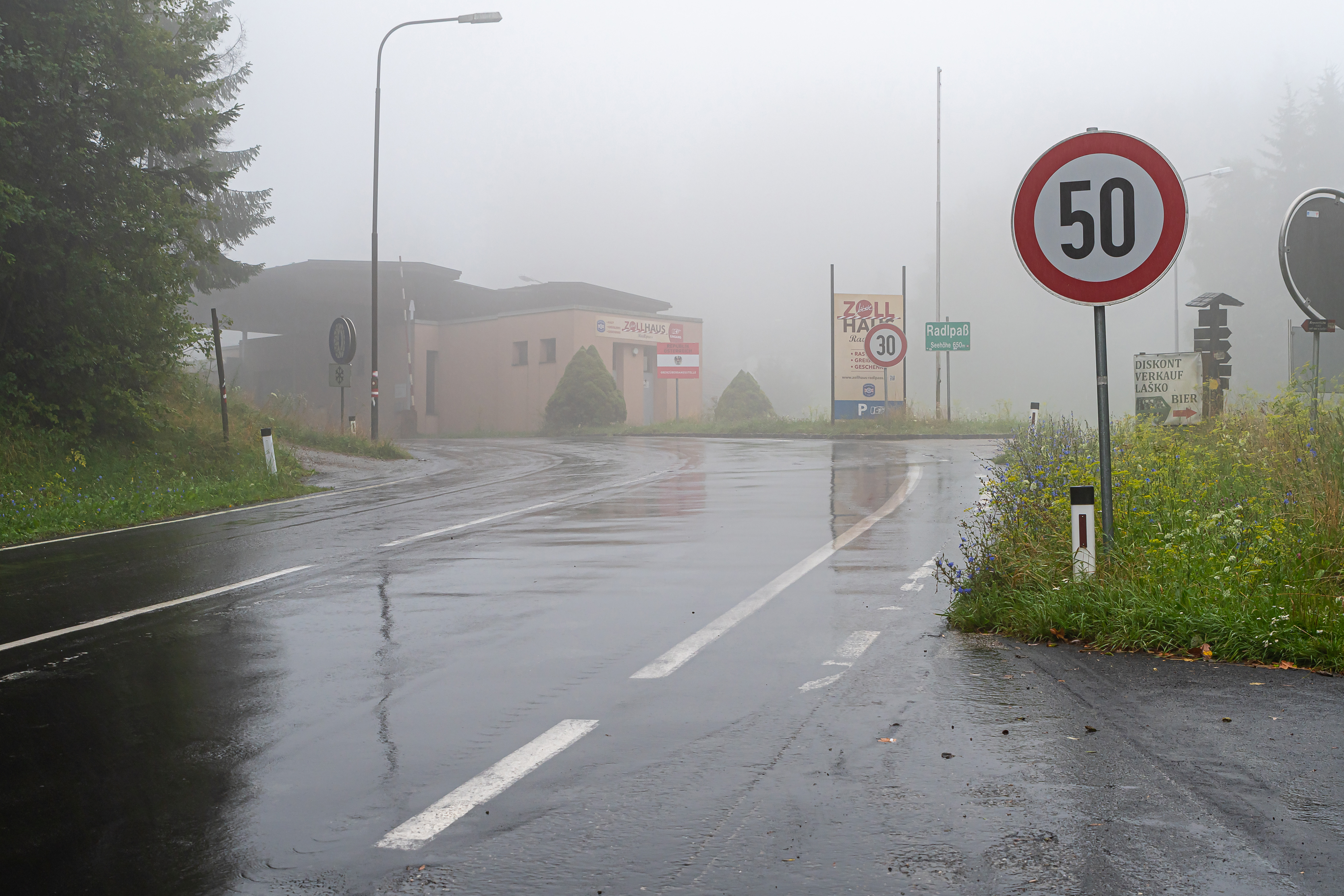
- Radl Pass draped in rainclouds

- Location within Alps
- Elevation: 670 metres (2,200 ft)
- Traversed by: Federal Highway B 76

Third Approach
- Location: Austria–Slovenia border
- Range: Alps
- Coordinates: 46°38′41″N 15°12′23″E

Radl Pass (Slovene: Radeljski prelaz), with an elevation of 670 metres (2,200 ft), is a mountain pass in the Alps, located on the border between Austria and Slovenia in the Bundesland of Styria.

The pass road begins in the municipality of Lieboch and crosses the A 2 Autobahn. It is used heavily by industrial traffic.

== See also ==
- List of highest paved roads in Europe
- List of mountain passes
