= March 20 =

March 20 this year in various calendars
- Friday, 20 March 2026
Akan	Nkyifie
Armenian	3 Ahekani 1475
Aztec	Huei Tecuilhuitl 9, 5 Ōlīn
Babylonian	30 Shabatu, 2336 SE
Balinese pawukon	Luang, Pepet, Kajeng, Sri, Umanis, Urukung, Sukra of Kelawu, Sri, Gigis, Pati
Bengali	6 Chaitro, BS 1432
Chinese	Yin Water Snake・Bond Mansion; Fire Horse Year, Month 2, Day 2 (Chunfen, 16 days until Qingming)
Common Era	20 March 2026 CE
Coptic	11 Paremhat, AM 1742
Egyptian	8 Mesori, 2774 NE
Ethiopian	11 Magābit, 2018 Amätä Məhrät
French Republican	Décade III, Décadi de Ventôse de l'Année 234 de la République
Gregorian	20 March, AD 2026
Hebrew	2 Nisan, AM 5786
Hindu	Revatī・Śukla; Solar: 7 Caitra, 1947 SE; Lunisolar: Dvitīyā, Śukla pakṣa of Caitra, 2083 VE; Rāudra・5126 KY・1,872,654
Icelandic	Föstudagur, 27 Góa 2025
Islamic	1 Shawwal, AH 1447 (using tabular method)
ISO week date	2026-W12-5
Japanese	2 Kisaragi, Reiwa 8 (Shunbun, 16 days until Seimei)
Julian	7 March, AD 2026 (AM 7534)
Julian day	2461120
Korean	2 Tokkidal, 4359 DE
Maya	13.0.13.7.17; 15 Cumku, 5 Caban
Roman	Nonis Martiis, MMDCCLXXIX AUC
Solar Hijri	29 Esfand, SH 1404
Tibetan	2 dbo, me pho rta 2153 or 1772 or 1000

<<	March					>>
Su	Mo	Tu	We	Th	Fr	Sa
1	2	3	4	5	6	7
8	9	10	11	12	13	14
15	16	17	18	19	20	21
22	23	24	25	26	27	28
29	30	31
2026

March 20 in recent years
2026 (Friday)
2025 (Thursday)
2024 (Wednesday)
2023 (Monday)
2022 (Sunday)
2021 (Saturday)
2020 (Friday)
2019 (Wednesday)
2018 (Tuesday)
2017 (Monday)

March 20 is the 79th day of the year (80th in leap years) in the Gregorian calendar; 286 days remain until the end of the year.

== Events ==
=== Pre-1600 ===
- 1206 – Michael IV Autoreianos is appointed Ecumenical Patriarch of Constantinople.
- 1600 – The Linköping Bloodbath takes place on Maundy Thursday in Linköping, Sweden: five Swedish noblemen are publicly beheaded in the aftermath of the War against Sigismund (1598–1599).

=== 1601–1900 ===
- 1602 – The Dutch East India Company is established.
- 1616 – Sir Walter Raleigh is freed from the Tower of London after 13 years of imprisonment.
- 1760 – The Great Boston Fire of 1760 destroys 349 buildings.
- 1815 – After escaping from Elba, Napoleon enters Paris with a regular army of 140,000 and a volunteer force of around 200,000, beginning his "Hundred Days" rule.
- 1848 – German revolutions of 1848–49: King Ludwig I of Bavaria abdicates.
- 1852 – Harriet Beecher Stowe's Uncle Tom's Cabin is published.
- 1854 – The Republican Party of the United States is organized in Ripon, Wisconsin, US.
- 1861 – An earthquake destroys Mendoza, Argentina.
- 1883 – The Paris Convention for the Protection of Industrial Property is signed.
- 1888 – The premiere of the very first Romani language operetta is staged in Moscow, Russia.
- 1890 – Chancellor of the German Empire Otto von Bismarck is dismissed by Emperor Wilhelm II.
- 1896 – With the approval of Emperor Guangxu, the Qing dynasty post office is opened, marking the beginning of a postal service in China.

=== 1901–present ===
- 1903 – The first of a series of auctions of sheep farming land in southern Patagonia takes place impacting established settlers.
- 1913 – Sung Chiao-jen, a founder of the Chinese Nationalist Party, is wounded in an assassination attempt and dies 2 days later.
- 1914 – In the Curragh incident, over 100 British Army officers threaten to resign if ordered to march against the Ulster Volunteers.
- 1916 – Albert Einstein submits his paper, "The Foundation of the General Theory of Relativity", which establishes his general theory of relativity, to the journal Annalen der Physik.
- 1921 – The Upper Silesia plebiscite, mandated by the Versailles Treaty to determine a section of the border between Weimar Germany and Poland, is held.
- 1922 – The USS Langley is commissioned as the first United States Navy aircraft carrier.
- 1923 – The Arts Club of Chicago hosts the opening of Pablo Picasso's first United States showing, entitled Original Drawings by Pablo Picasso, becoming an early proponent of modern art in the United States.
- 1926 – Chiang Kai-shek initiates a purge of communist elements within the National Revolutionary Army in Guangzhou.
- 1933 – Reichsführer-SS Heinrich Himmler orders the creation of Dachau concentration camp as Chief of Police of Munich and appoints Theodor Eicke as the camp commandant.
- 1942 – World War II: General Douglas MacArthur, at Terowie, South Australia, makes his famous speech regarding the fall of the Philippines, in which he says: "I came out of Bataan and I shall return".
- 1948 – With a Musicians Union ban lifted, the first telecasts of classical music in the United States, under Eugene Ormandy and Arturo Toscanini, are given on CBS and NBC.
- 1951 – Fujiyoshida, a city located in Yamanashi Prefecture, Japan, in the center of the Japanese main island of Honshū is founded.
- 1952 – The US Senate ratifies the Security Treaty between the United States and Japan.
- 1956 – Tunisia gains independence from France.
- 1964 – The precursor of the European Space Agency, ESRO (European Space Research Organisation) is established per an agreement signed on June 14, 1962.
- 1969 – A United Arab Airlines (now Egyptair) Ilyushin Il-18 crashes at Aswan International Airport, killing 100 people.
- 1972 – The Troubles: The first car bombing by the Provisional IRA in Belfast kills seven people and injures 148 others in Northern Ireland.
- 1985 – Libby Riddles becomes the first woman to win the 1,135-mile Iditarod Trail Sled Dog Race.
- 1987 – The Food and Drug Administration approves the anti-AIDS drug, AZT.
- 1988 – Eritrean War of Independence: Having defeated the Nadew Command, the Eritrean People's Liberation Front enters the town of Afabet, victoriously concluding the Battle of Afabet.
- 1990 – Ferdinand Marcos's widow, Imelda Marcos, goes on trial for bribery, embezzlement, and racketeering.
- 1993 – The Troubles: A Provisional IRA bomb kills two children in Warrington, England. It leads to mass protests in both Britain and Ireland.
- 1995 – The Japanese cult Aum Shinrikyo carries out a sarin gas attack on the Tokyo subway, killing 14 and wounding over 6,200 people.
- 1999 – Legoland California, the first Legoland outside of Europe, opens in Carlsbad, California, US.
- 2000 – Jamil Abdullah Al-Amin, a former Black Panther once known as H. Rap Brown, is captured after murdering Georgia sheriff's deputy Ricky Kinchen and critically wounding Deputy Aldranon English.
- 2003 – Iraq War: The United States, the United Kingdom, Australia, and Poland begin an invasion of Iraq.
- 2006 – Over 150 Chadian soldiers are killed in eastern Chad by members of the rebel UFDC. The rebel movement sought to overthrow Chadian president Idriss Déby.
- 2010 – Eyjafjallajökull in Iceland begins eruptions that would last for three months, heavily disrupting air travel in Europe.
- 2012 – At least 52 people are killed and more than 250 injured in a wave of terror attacks across ten cities in Iraq.
- 2014 – Four suspected Taliban members attack the Kabul Serena Hotel, killing at least nine people.
- 2015 – A solar eclipse, equinox, and a supermoon all occur on the same day.
- 2015 – Syrian civil war: The Siege of Kobanî is broken by the People's Protection Units (YPG) and Free Syrian Army (FSA), marking a turning point in the Rojava–Islamist conflict.
- 2019 – Kassym-Jomart Tokayev is sworn in as acting president of Kazakhstan, following the resignation of long-time president Nursultan Nazarbayev.
- 2021 – La Plume noire, an anarchist bookstore in Lyon, is targeted by an attack of the far-right, provoking a shock in Lyon's far-left circles.

== Births ==
=== Pre-1600 ===
- 43 BC – Ovid, Roman poet (died 17)
- 1253 – Magadu, renamed Wareru, founder of Ramanya Kingdom, renamed Hanthawady Kingdom of Pegu (died 1307)
- 1319 – Laurence Hastings, 1st Earl of Pembroke (died 1348)
- 1469 – Cecily of York (died 1507)
- 1477 – Jerome Emser, German theologian and scholar (died 1527)
- 1479 – Ippolito d'Este, Italian cardinal (died 1520)
- 1502 – Pierino Belli, Italian soldier and jurist (died 1575)
- 1532 – Juan de Ribera, Roman Catholic archbishop (died 1611)

=== 1601–1900 ===
- 1612 – Anne Bradstreet, Puritan American poet (died 1672)
- 1615 – Dara Shikoh, Indian prince (died 1659)
- 1639 – Ivan Mazepa, Ukrainian diplomat, Hetman of Ukraine (died 1709)
- 1680 – Emanuele d'Astorga, Italian composer (died 1736)
- 1725 – Abdul Hamid I, Ottoman sultan (died 1789)
- 1737 – Rama I, Thai king (died 1809)
- 1771 – Heinrich Clauren, German author (died 1854)
- 1796 – Edward Gibbon Wakefield, English politician (died 1862)
- 1799 – Karl August Nicander, Swedish poet and author (died 1839)
- 1800 – Braulio Carrillo Colina, Costa Rican lawyer and politician, President of Costa Rica (died 1845)
- 1805 – Thomas Cooper, British poet (died 1892)
- 1811 – Napoleon II, French emperor (died 1832)
- 1811 – George Caleb Bingham, American painter and politician, State Treasurer of Missouri (died 1879)
- 1821 – Ned Buntline, American journalist, author, and publisher (died 1886)
- 1824 – Theodor von Heuglin, German explorer and ornithologist (died 1876)
- 1828 – Henrik Ibsen, Norwegian poet, playwright, and director (died 1906)
- 1831 – Patrick Jennings, Northern Irish-Australian politician, 11th Premier of New South Wales (died 1897)
- 1831 – Solomon L. Spink, American lawyer and politician (died 1881)
- 1834 – Charles William Eliot, American mathematician and academic (died 1926)
- 1836 – Ferris Jacobs, Jr., American general, lawyer, and politician (died 1886)
- 1836 – Edward Poynter, English painter, illustrator, and curator (died 1919)
- 1840 – Illarion Pryanishnikov, Russian painter (died 1894)
- 1843 – Ambrosio Flores, Filipino politician (died 1912)
- 1851 – Ismail Gasprinski, Crimean Tatar educator, publisher, and politician (died 1914)
- 1856 – John Lavery, Irish painter (died 1941)
- 1856 – Frederick Winslow Taylor, American tennis player and engineer (died 1915)
- 1865 – Mike Griffin, American baseball player (died 1908)
- 1870 – Paul von Lettow-Vorbeck, German general (died 1964)
- 1871 – Joe McGinnity, American baseball player
- 1874 – Börries von Münchhausen, German poet and activist (died 1945)
- 1876 – Payne Whitney, American businessman and philanthropist (died 1927)
- 1879 – Maud Menten, Canadian physician and biochemist (died 1960)
- 1882 – René Coty, French lawyer and politician, 17th President of France (died 1962)
- 1882 – Harold Weber, American golfer (died 1933)
- 1884 – Philipp Frank, Austrian-American physicist, mathematician, and philosopher (died 1966)
- 1884 – John Jensen, Australian public servant (died 1970)
- 1885 – Vernon Ransford, Australian cricketer (died 1958)
- 1888 – Amanda Clement, American baseball player, umpire, and educator (died 1971)
- 1890 – Lauritz Melchior, Danish-American tenor and actor (died 1973)
- 1894 – Amalie Sara Colquhoun, Australian landscape and portrait painter (died 1974)
- 1895 – Fredric Wertham, German-American psychologist and author (died 1981)
- 1897 – Frank Sheed, Australian-British Catholic writer and apologist (died 1981)
- 1898 – Eduard Wiiralt, Estonian artist (died 1954)
- 1899 – Vladimír Mandl, Czechoslovak lawyer (died 1941)
- 1900 – Amelia Chopitea Villa, Bolivia's first female physician (died 1942)

=== 1901–present ===
- 1903 – Edgar Buchanan, American actor (died 1979)
- 1904 – B. F. Skinner, American psychologist and author (died 1990)
- 1905 – Jean Galia, French rugby player and boxer (died 1949)
- 1906 – Abraham Beame, American accountant and politician, 105th Mayor of New York City (died 2001)
- 1906 – Ozzie Nelson, American actor and bandleader (died 1975)
- 1907 – Hugh MacLennan, Canadian author and educator (died 1990)
- 1908 – Michael Redgrave, English actor (died 1985)
- 1909 – Elisabeth Geleerd, Dutch-American psychoanalyst (died 1969)
- 1910 – Erwin Blask, German hammer thrower (died 1999)
- 1911 – Alfonso García Robles, Mexican lawyer and diplomat, Nobel Prize laureate (died 1991)
- 1912 – Ralph Hauenstein, American businessman and philanthropist (died 2016)
- 1913 – Nikolai Stepulov, Russian-Estonian boxer (died 1968)
- 1914 – Wendell Corey, American actor and politician (died 1968)
- 1915 – Rudolf Kirchschläger, Austrian judge and politician, 8th President of Austria (died 2000)
- 1915 – Sviatoslav Richter, Ukrainian pianist and composer (died 1997)
- 1915 – Sister Rosetta Tharpe, American singer-songwriter and guitarist (died 1973)
- 1915 – Stan Spence, American baseball player (died 1983)
- 1916 – Pierre Messmer, French lieutenant and politician, Prime Minister of France (died 2007)
- 1917 – Yigael Yadin, Israeli archaeologist, general, and politician, Deputy Prime Minister of Israel (died 1984)
- 1917 – Vera Lynn, English singer and actress (died 2020)
- 1918 – Jack Barry, American game show host and producer, co-founded Barry & Enright Productions (died 1984)
- 1918 – Donald Featherstone, English soldier and author (died 2013)
- 1918 – Marian McPartland, English-American pianist and composer (died 2013)
- 1918 – Bernd Alois Zimmermann, German composer (died 1970)
- 1919 – Gerhard Barkhorn, German fighter ace (died 1983)
- 1920 – Rosemary Timperley, English author and screenwriter (died 1988)
- 1921 – Usmar Ismail, Indonesian filmmaker (died 1971)
- 1921 – Dušan Pirjevec, Slovenian historian and philosopher (died 1977)
- 1921 – Alfréd Rényi, Hungarian mathematician and theorist (died 1970)
- 1922 – Larry Elgart, American saxophonist and bandleader (died 2017)
- 1922 – Ray Goulding, American actor and screenwriter (died 1990)
- 1923 – Con Martin, Irish footballer and manager (died 2013)
- 1923 – Shaukat Siddiqui, Pakistani journalist, author, and activist (died 2006)
- 1925 – John Ehrlichman, American lawyer, 12th White House Counsel (died 1999)
- 1927 – John Joubert, South African-English composer and academic (died 2019)
- 1928 – Jerome Biffle, American long jumper and coach (died 2002)
- 1928 – James P. Gordon, American physicist and engineer (died 2013)
- 1928 – Fred Rogers, American television host and author
- 1929 – William Andrew MacKay, Canadian lawyer and judge (died 2013)
- 1929 – Germán Robles, Spanish-Mexican actor and director (died 2015)
- 1930 – S. Arasaratnam, Sri Lankan historian, author, and academic (died 1998)
- 1931 – Dinos Christianopoulos, Greek poet (died 2020)
- 1931 – Rein Raamat, Estonian director and screenwriter
- 1933 – Lateef Adegbite, Nigerian lawyer and politician (died 2012)
- 1933 – George Altman, American baseball player
- 1934 – Willie Brown, American soldier, lawyer, and politician, 41st Mayor of San Francisco
- 1934 – David Malouf, Australian author and playwright (died 2026)
- 1935 – Ted Bessell, American actor and director (died 1996)
- 1935 – Bettye Washington Greene, American chemist (died 1995)
- 1936 – Lee "Scratch" Perry, Jamaican singer, songwriter, music producer, and inventor (died 2021)
- 1936 – Mark Saville, Baron Saville of Newdigate, English lieutenant, lawyer, and judge
- 1937 – Jerry Reed, American singer-songwriter, guitarist, and actor (died 2008)
- 1937 – Lois Lowry, American writer
- 1938 – Sergei Novikov, Russian mathematician and academic, winner of the Fields Medal (died 2024)
- 1938 – John Barnhill, American basketball player and coach (died 2013)
- 1939 – Gerald Curran, American lawyer and politician (died 2013)
- 1939 – Don Edwards, American singer-songwriter and guitarist (died 2022)
- 1939 – Walter Jakob Gehring, Swiss biologist and academic (died 2014)
- 1939 – Brian Mulroney, Canadian lawyer and politician, 18th Prime Minister of Canada (died 2024)
- 1940 – Stathis Chaitas, Greek footballer and manager
- 1940 – Mary Ellen Mark, American photographer and journalist (died 2015)
- 1940 – Giampiero Moretti, Italian race car driver and businessman, founded the Momo company (died 2012)
- 1941 – Pat Corrales, American baseball player and manager (died 2023)
- 1941 – Kenji Kimihara, Japanese runner
- 1942 – Robin Luke, American singer-songwriter
- 1943 – Gerard Malanga, American poet and photographer
- 1943 – Douglas Tompkins, American businessman, co-founded The North Face and Esprit Holdings (died 2015)
- 1943 – Paul Junger Witt, American director and producer (died 2018)
- 1944 – John Cameron, English composer and conductor
- 1944 – Camille Cosby, American author, producer, and philanthropist
- 1944 – Alan Harper, English-Irish archbishop
- 1945 – Henry Bartholomay, American soldier and pilot (died 2015)
- 1945 – Jay Ingram, Canadian television host and author
- 1945 – Pat Riley, American basketball player, coach and executive
- 1945 – Tim Yeo, English politician, Shadow Secretary of State for Health
- 1946 – Douglas B. Green, American singer-songwriter and guitarist
- 1946 – Malcolm Simmons, English motorcycle racer (died 2014)
- 1947 – John Boswell, American historian, philologist, and academic (died 1994)
- 1948 – John de Lancie, American actor
- 1948 – Nikos Papazoglou, Greek singer-songwriter and producer (died 2011)
- 1948 – Bobby Orr, Canadian ice hockey player
- 1949 – Richard Dowden, English journalist and educator
- 1950 – William Hurt, American actor (died 2022)
- 1950 – Carl Palmer, English drummer
- 1952 – Geoff Brabham, Australian race car driver
- 1952 – David Greenaway, English economist and academic
- 1953 – Phil Judd, New Zealand singer-songwriter, guitarist and painter
- 1954 – Mike Francesa, American radio talk show host and television commentator
- 1954 – Liana Kanelli, Greek journalist and politician
- 1954 – Paul Mirabella, American baseball player
- 1954 – Charlie Simmer, Canadian ice hockey player
- 1955 – Nina Kiriki Hoffman, American author
- 1955 – Ian Moss, Australian guitarist and singer-songwriter
- 1955 – Mariya Takeuchi, Japanese singer-songwriter
- 1956 – Catherine Ashton, English politician, Vice-President of the European Commission
- 1956 – Anne Donahue, American lawyer and politician
- 1956 – Naoto Takenaka, Japanese actor, comedian, singer, and director
- 1957 – David Foster, Australian woodchopper
- 1957 – Spike Lee, American actor, director, producer, and screenwriter
- 1957 – Chris Wedge, American animator, producer, screenwriter, and voice actor
- 1957 – Theresa Russell, American actress
- 1958 – Rickey Jackson, American football player
- 1958 – Holly Hunter, American actress
- 1959 – Dave Beasant, English footballer and coach
- 1959 – Mary Roach, American author
- 1959 – Sting, American wrestler
- 1959 – Peter Truscott, Baron Truscott, British Labour Party politician and peer
- 1960 – Norm Magnusson, American painter and sculptor
- 1960 – Norbert Pohlmann, German computer scientist and academic
- 1960 – Yuri Shargin, Russian colonel, engineer, and astronaut
- 1961 – Ingrid Arndt-Brauer, German politician
- 1961 – Jesper Olsen, Danish footballer and manager
- 1961 – Sara Wheeler, English author and journalist
- 1962 – Stephen Sommers, American director, producer, and screenwriter
- 1963 – Paul Annacone, American tennis player and coach
- 1963 – Yelena Romanova, Russian runner (died 2007)
- 1963 – David Thewlis, English actor
- 1963 – Kathy Ireland, American model, actress and businesswoman
- 1964 – Natacha Atlas, Belgian singer-songwriter
- 1965 – William Dalrymple, Scottish historian and author
- 1967 – Xavier Beauvois, French actor, director, and screenwriter
- 1967 – Mookie Blaylock, American basketball player
- 1968 – A. J. Jacobs, American journalist and author
- 1968 – Paul Merson, English footballer and manager
- 1968 – Ultra Naté, American singer, songwriter, record producer, DJ, and promoter
- 1968 – Ken Ono, Japanese-American mathematician
- 1969 – Yvette Cooper, English economist and politician, former Secretary of State for Work and Pensions
- 1969 – Fabien Galthié, French rugby player
- 1970 – Edoardo Ballerini, American actor, director, producer, and screenwriter
- 1970 – Josephine Medina, Filipino Paralympic table tennis player (died 2021)
- 1970 – Michael Rapaport, American actor and comedian
- 1971 – Manny Alexander, Dominican baseball player
- 1971 – Touré, American journalist and author
- 1972 – Chilly Gonzales, Canadian-German singer-songwriter, pianist, and producer
- 1972 – Alex Kapranos, English-Scottish singer-songwriter, guitarist, and producer
- 1972 – Greg Searle, English rower
- 1972 – Marco Sejna, German footballer
- 1972 – Cristel Vahtra, Estonian skier
- 1973 – Nicky Boje, South African cricketer
- 1973 – Natalya Khrushcheleva, Russian runner
- 1973 – Talal Khalifa Aljeri, Kuwaiti businessman
- 1973 – Cedric Yarbrough, American actor and comedian
- 1974 – Carsten Ramelow, German footballer
- 1975 – Ramin Bahrani, American director, producer, and screenwriter
- 1975 – Isolde Kostner, Italian skier
- 1976 – Chester Bennington, American singer and songwriter (died 2017)
- 1978 – Kevin Betsy, English-Seychellois footballer and manager
- 1978 – Brent Sherwin, Australian rugby league player
- 1979 – Shinnosuke Abe, Japanese baseball player
- 1979 – Daniel Cormier, American mixed martial artist
- 1979 – Keven Mealamu, New Zealand rugby player
- 1979 – Freema Agyeman, English actress
- 1979 – Bianca Lawson, American actress
- 1980 – Jamal Crawford, American basketball player
- 1980 – Robertas Javtokas, Lithuanian basketball player
- 1980 – Michelle Snow, American basketball player
- 1980 – Mikey Day, American actor and comedian
- 1981 – Ian Murray, Scottish footballer
- 1981 – Carl Webb, Australian rugby league player (died 2023)
- 1982 – Terrence Duffin, Zimbabwean cricketer
- 1982 – Tomasz Kuszczak, Polish footballer
- 1982 – José Moreira, Portuguese footballer
- 1983 – Carolina Padrón, Venezuelan journalist
- 1983 – Jenni Vartiainen, Finnish singer
- 1983 – Dennis Wideman, Canadian ice hockey player
- 1984 – Vikram Banerjee, English cricketer
- 1984 – Valtteri Filppula, Finnish ice hockey player
- 1984 – IJustine, American YouTuber
- 1984 – Fernando Torres, Spanish footballer
- 1985 – Morgan Amalfitano, French footballer
- 1985 – Ronnie Brewer, American basketball player
- 1985 – Nicolas Lombaerts, Belgian footballer
- 1986 – Dean Geyer, South African-Australian singer-songwriter and actor
- 1986 – Julián Magallanes, Argentinian footballer
- 1986 – Román Torres, Panamanian footballer
- 1986 – Ruby Rose, Australian actress and model
- 1987 – Daniel Maa Boumsong, Cameroonian footballer
- 1987 – Jon Brockman, American basketball player
- 1987 – Jô, Brazilian footballer
- 1987 – Pedro Ken, Brazilian footballer
- 1987 – Sergei Kostitsyn, Belarusian ice hockey player
- 1989 – Xavier Dolan, Canadian actor and director
- 1989 – Tamim Iqbal, Bangladeshi cricketer
- 1990 – Blake Ferguson, Australian rugby league player
- 1990 – Brad Hand, American baseball player
- 1990 – Marcos Rojo, Argentine footballer
- 1991 – Mattia Destro, Italian footballer
- 1991 – Michał Kucharczyk, Polish footballer
- 1991 – Nick Leddy, American ice hockey player
- 1992 – Justin Faulk, American ice hockey player
- 1993 – Fabian Fahl, German politician
- 1993 – JaKarr Sampson, American basketball player
- 1993 – Sloane Stephens, American tennis player
- 1995 – Lindsay Allen, American basketball player
- 1995 – Kei, South Korean singer
- 1995 – Nick Paul, Canadian ice hockey player
- 1995 – Samantha Weinstein, Canadian actress (died 2023)
- 2000 – Hyunjin, South Korean rapper
- 2001 – Trevor Zegras, American ice hockey player
- 2002 – Jahmyr Gibbs, American football player
- 2003 – Cooper Hoffman, American actor
- 2004 – Belle, American singer

== Deaths ==
=== Pre-1600 ===
- 687 – Cuthbert, Northumbrian (English) monk, bishop, and saint (born 634)
- 703 – Wulfram, archbishop of Sens
- 842 – Alfonso II, king of Asturias (Spain) (born 759)
- 851 – Ebbo, archbishop of Reims
- 1181 – Taira no Kiyomori, Japanese general (born 1118)
- 1191 – Pope Clement III (born 1130)
- 1239 – Hermann von Salza, German knight and diplomat (born 1179)
- 1302 – Ralph Walpole, Bishop of Norwich
- 1336 – Maurice Csák, Hungarian Dominican friar (born 1270)
- 1351 – Muhammad bin Tughluq, Sultan of Delhi
- 1390 – Alexios III Megas Komnenos, Emperor of Trebizond (born 1338)
- 1413 – Henry IV of England (born 1367)
- 1440 – Sigismund I of Lithuania
- 1475 – Georges Chastellain, Burgundian chronicler and poet
- 1549 – Thomas Seymour, 1st Baron Seymour of Sudeley, English general and politician, Lord Warden of the Cinque Ports (born 1508)
- 1568 – Albert, Duke of Prussia (born 1490)

=== 1601–1900 ===
- 1619 – Matthias, Holy Roman Emperor (born 1557)
- 1673 – Augustyn Kordecki, Polish monk (born 1603)
- 1688 – Maria of Orange-Nassau, Dutch princess (born 1642)
- 1730 – Adrienne Lecouvreur, French actress (born 1692)
- 1746 – Nicolas de Largillière, French painter and academic (born 1656)
- 1780 – Benjamin Truman, English brewer and businessman (born 1699)
- 1793 – William Murray, 1st Earl of Mansfield, Scottish judge and politician, Attorney General for England and Wales (born 1705)
- 1835 – Louis Léopold Robert, French painter (born 1794)
- 1849 – James Justinian Morier, Turkish-English author and diplomat (born 1780)
- 1855 – Joseph Aspdin, English businessman (born 1788)
- 1865 – Yamanami Keisuke, Japanese samurai (born 1833)
- 1874 – Hans Christian Lumbye, Danish composer and conductor (born 1810)
- 1878 – Julius Robert von Mayer, German physician and physicist (born 1814)
- 1894 – Lajos Kossuth, Hungarian lawyer, journalist and politician (born 1802)
- 1897 – Apollon Maykov, Russian poet and playwright (born 1821)
- 1899 – Franz Ritter von Hauer, Austrian geologist and author (born 1822)

=== 1901–present ===
- 1909 – Friedrich Amelung, Estonian historian and businessman (born 1842)
- 1918 – Lewis A. Grant, American general and lawyer (born 1828)
- 1925 – George Curzon, 1st Marquess Curzon of Kedleston, English politician, 35th Governor-General of India (born 1859)
- 1929 – Ferdinand Foch, French field marshal (born 1851)
- 1930 – Arthur F. Andrews, American cyclist (born 1876)
- 1931 – Hermann Müller, German journalist and politician, 12th Chancellor of Germany (born 1876)
- 1933 – Giuseppe Zangara, Italian-American assassin of Anton Cermak (born 1900; executed)
- 1940 – Alfred Ploetz, German physician, biologist, and eugenicist (born 1860)
- 1941 – Oskar Baum, Bohemian writer (born 1883)
- 1945 – Dorothy Campbell, Scottish-American golfer (born 1883)
- 1945 – Maria Lacerda de Moura, Brazilian teacher and anarcha-feminist (born 1887)
- 1946 – Amadeus William Grabau, American-Chinese geologist, paleontologist, and academic (born 1870)
- 1947 – Sigurd Wallén, Swedish actor and director (born 1884)
- 1952 – Hjalmar Väre, Finnish cyclist (born 1892)
- 1958 – Adegoke Adelabu, Nigerian merchant, journalist, and politician (born 1915)
- 1964 – Brendan Behan, Irish republican and playwright (born 1923)
- 1965 – Daniel Frank, American long jumper (born 1882)
- 1966 – Demetrios Galanis, Greek artist (born 1879)
- 1966 – Johnny Morrison, American baseball player (born 1895)
- 1968 – Carl Theodor Dreyer, Danish director and screenwriter (born 1889)
- 1969 – Henri Longchambon, French politician (born 1896)
- 1971 – Falih Rıfkı Atay, Turkish journalist and politician (born 1894)
- 1972 – Marilyn Maxwell, American actress (born 1921)
- 1974 – Chet Huntley, American journalist (born 1911)
- 1977 – Charles Lyttelton, 10th Viscount Cobham, English politician, 9th Governor-General of New Zealand (born 1909)
- 1977 – Terukuni Manzō, Japanese sumo wrestler, the 38th Yokozuna (born 1919)
- 1978 – Jacques Brugnon, French tennis player (born 1895)
- 1981 – Gerry Bertier, American football player (born 1953)
- 1983 – Ivan Matveyevich Vinogradov, Russian mathematician and academic (born 1891)
- 1990 – Maurice Cloche, French director, producer, and screenwriter (born 1907)
- 1990 – Lev Yashin, Russian footballer (born 1929)
- 1992 – Georges Delerue, French composer (born 1925)
- 1993 – Polykarp Kusch, German-American physicist and academic, Nobel Prize laureate (born 1911)
- 1994 – Lewis Grizzard, American writer and humorist (born 1946)
- 1997 – V. S. Pritchett, English short story writer, essayist, and critic (born 1900)
- 1999 – Patrick Heron, British painter (born 1920)
- 2000 – Gene Eugene, Canadian-American singer-songwriter and producer (born 1961)
- 2001 – Luis Alvarado, Puerto Rican-American baseball player (born 1949)
- 2004 – Juliana of the Netherlands (born 1909)
- 2004 – Pierre Sévigny, Canadian colonel and politician (born 1917)
- 2005 – Armand Lohikoski, American-Finnish director and screenwriter (born 1912)
- 2007 – Raynald Fréchette, Canadian lawyer, judge, and politician (born 1933)
- 2007 – Taha Yassin Ramadan, Iraqi politician, Vice President of Iraq (born 1938)
- 2007 – Hawa Yakubu, Ghanaian politician (born 1948)
- 2010 – Ai, American poet and academic (born 1947)
- 2010 – Girija Prasad Koirala, Indian-Nepalese politician, 30th Prime Minister of Nepal (born 1924)
- 2010 – Stewart Udall, American soldier, lawyer, and politician, 37th United States Secretary of the Interior (born 1920)
- 2011 – Johnny Pearson, English pianist, conductor, and composer (born 1925)
- 2012 – Lincoln Hall, Australian mountaineer and author (born 1955)
- 2012 – Noboru Ishiguro, Japanese animator and director (born 1938)
- 2012 – Chaim Pinchas Scheinberg, Polish-Israeli rabbi and author (born 1910)
- 2012 – Jim Stynes, Irish-Australian footballer (born 1966)
- 2013 – James Herbert, English author (born 1943)
- 2013 – George Lowe, New Zealand-English mountaineer and explorer (born 1924)
- 2013 – Zillur Rahman, Bangladeshi lawyer and politician, 19th President of Bangladesh (born 1929)
- 2014 – Hennie Aucamp, South African poet, author, and academic (born 1934)
- 2014 – Hilderaldo Bellini, Brazilian footballer (born 1930)
- 2014 – Tonie Nathan, American politician (born 1923)
- 2014 – Khushwant Singh, Indian journalist and author (born 1915)
- 2015 – Eva Burrows, Australian 13th General of The Salvation Army (born 1929)
- 2015 – Malcolm Fraser, Australian politician, 22nd Prime Minister of Australia (born 1930)
- 2016 – Anker Jørgensen, Danish politician, Prime Minister of Denmark (born 1922)
- 2017 – David Rockefeller, American billionaire and philanthropist (born 1915)
- 2018 – C. K. Mann, Ghanaian Highlife musician and producer (born 1936)
- 2019 – Mary Warnock, English philosopher and writer (born 1924)
- 2020 – Amadeo Carrizo, Argentine footballer (born 1926)
- 2020 – Kenny Rogers, American singer (born 1938)
- 2023 – John Sattler, Australian rugby league player (born 1942)
- 2023 – Kyle White, Australian rugby league player (born 1970)
- 2025 – Eddie Jordan, Irish businessman, television personality and motorsport team owner (born 1948)
- 2026 – Nicholas Brendon, American actor (born 1971)
- 2026 – Filaret Denysenko, Ukrainian religious leader, Patriarch of the Ukrainian Orthodox Church – Kyiv Patriarchate (born 1929)
- 2026 – Robert Mueller, American attorney, Director of the Federal Bureau of Investigation (born 1944)

== Holidays and observances ==
- Christian feast day:
  - Alexandra
  - Blessed John of Parma
  - Clement of Ireland
  - Cuthbert of Lindisfarne
  - Herbert of Derwentwater
  - John of Nepomuk
  - Józef Bilczewski
  - María Josefa Sancho de Guerra
  - Martin of Braga
  - Michele Carcano
  - Wulfram
  - March 20 (Eastern Orthodox liturgics)
- Great American MeatOut (United States)
- Independence Day, celebrates the independence of Tunisia from France in 1956.
- International Day of Happiness (United Nations)
- International Francophonie Day (Organisation internationale de la Francophonie), and its related observances:
  - UN French Language Day (United Nations)
- National Native HIV/AIDS Awareness Day (United States)
- World Sparrow Day
