= Riemer =

Riemer (German and Jewish (Ashkenazic): occupational name for a maker of leather reins and similar articles Middle High German riemære German Riemer Yiddish rime) is a surname. Notable people with the surname include:

- Andrew Riemer (1936–2020), Australian literary critic and author
- Brian Riemer, (born 1978), Danish football coach
- Daniel Riemer (born 1986), American politician
- Dennis Riemer (born 1988), German footballer
- Friedrich Wilhelm Riemer (1774–1845), German scholar and literary historian
- Gustav Riemer (1860–1922), American politician
- Harold de Riemer Morgan (1888–1964), British Army officer
- Isaac De Riemer (1666–1729), American politician
- Jeffrey R. Riemer (born 1951), American air force general
- Josef Riemer (born 1950), Austrian politician
- Julius Riemer (1880–1958), German industrialist and museum collector
- Marco Riemer (born 1988), German footballer
- Yvon Riemer (born 1970), French wrestler

== See also ==
- Remer (disambiguation)
- Reimers, a surname
