= Remer =

Remer may refer to:

== People ==
- John Remer (1883–1948), British politician
- Otto Ernst Remer (1912–1997), Nazi officer
- Richard Remer (1883–1973), American athlete
- Tim Remer (born 1985), Dutch handball player
- Willi Remer (1908–1947), German modern pentathlete

== Other uses ==
- Remèr, a Venetian craftsman of traditional rowlocks and oars
- Remer, Minnesota, a small city in the United States
- Remer Township, Cass County, Minnesota, in the United States

== See also ==
- Reimer, a name
- Riemer, a name
- Reimers, a name
- DeRemer, a name
- Terra Lawson-Remer (born 1978), American politician
