= Holger Mühlbauer =

German jurist and writer (born 1964)

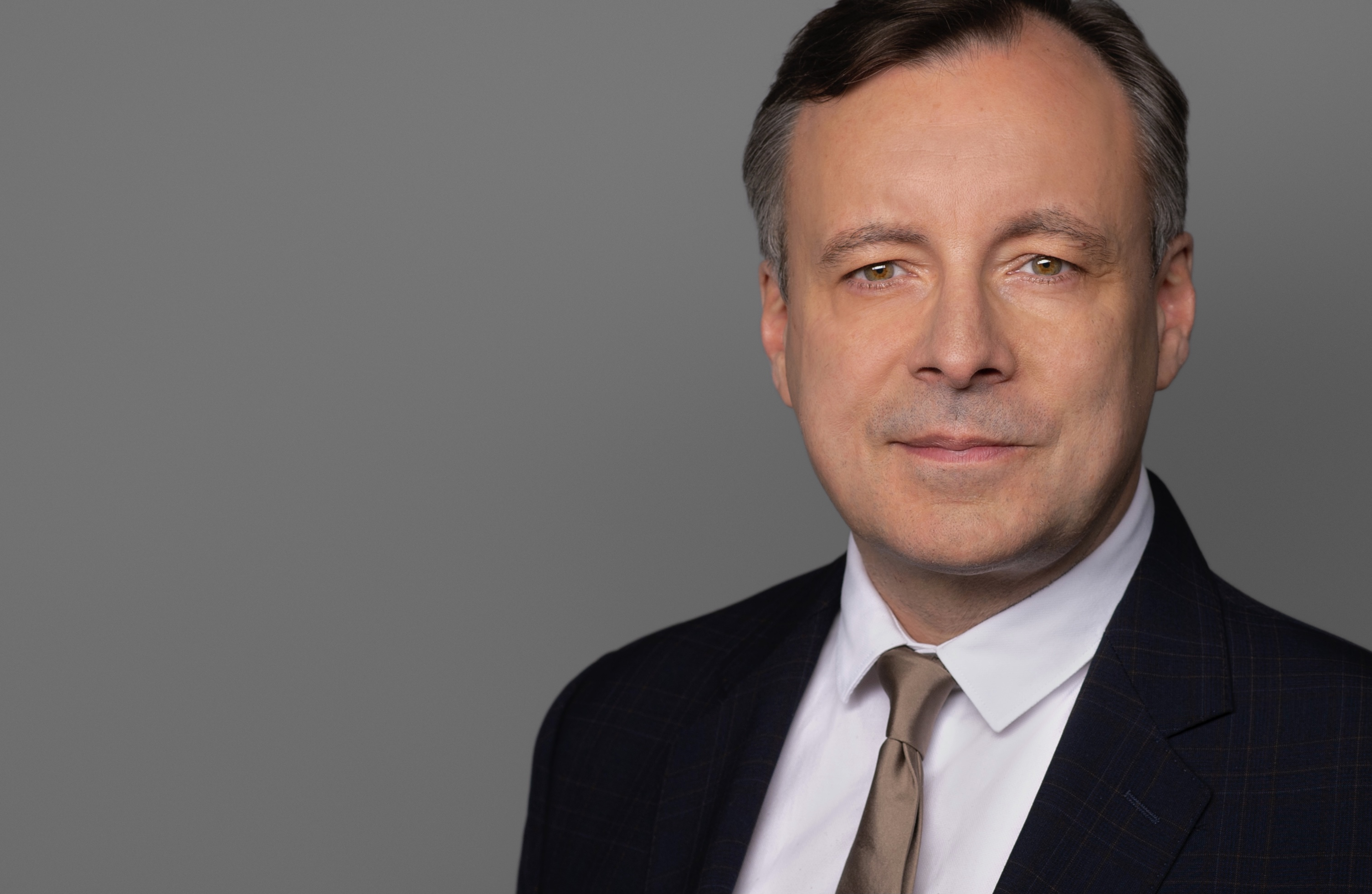
- Holger Mühlbauer in 2021
- Born: 1964 (age 60–61)
- Occupations: Jurist; Author; Managing director
- Organizations: DIN; Austrian Standards; CEN; ISO; TeleTrusT

Holger Mühlbauer ([ˈhɔlɡɐ ˈmyːlˌbaʊ̯ɐ]; born 1964) is a German jurist and writer, focused on technical standards and information security, working for the German DIN as managing director of a committee, for the Austrian Standards, the European Committee for Standardization (CEN) and the International Organization for Standardization (ISO). He is managing director of TeleTrusT, and author of specialist books.

== Career ==
Mühlbauer first trained to be a metalworker and worked in the profession.

=== Berlin ===
After military service Mühlbauer studied law, and worked as a scientific assistant at the TU Berlin for the faculty of computer science (Informatik), where he focused on data security and information law (Informationsrecht). He wrote his doctoral thesis in 1994 about Einwohnermeldewesen (Residents' registration). He then worked for the Kassenärztliche Vereinigung in Berlin. From 1996 he worked for the Deutsches Institut für Normung (DIN), the German institute for technical standards in Berlin, as managing director for the standards committee (Normenausschuss) for usability and services.

=== Vienna ===
In 2000, Mühlbauer moved to the Austrian equivalent, Austrian Standards, in Vienna. He held the position of committee Secretary in organisations such as the European Committee for Standardization (CEN) and the International Standards Organisation (ISO). For ISO and CEN, he served as Secretary of service-related committees, including Tourism Services, Personal Financial Planning, Psychological Assessment, Brand Valuation, Learning Services for Non-Formal Education and Training, Print Media Surveys, and Rating Services. He initiated the ISO project "Brand valuation". He serves as an auditor for the ISO 20252 standard, (Requirements on services of market, opinion and social research), and for ISO 10668, (Brand valuation), among others.

=== Return to Berlin ===
Since 2009, Mühlbauer is the managing director of the IT Security Association Germany (TeleTrusT), which has established reliable conditions for trustworthy application of information and communication technologies. In 2020, he contributed to Wirtschaftswoche's Economy 4.0 – Die Digitalisierung der Wirtschaft (the digitalisation of science). Mühlbauer coordinates the annual technology presentations "IT Security made in Germany" at the RSA Conference San Francisco and at GISEC Dubai.

== Publications ==
Mühlbauer authored specialist books, including practical dictionaries (Praxiswörterbuch). They were published by Beuth Verlag, including:

- 2020 Praxiswörterbuch / Brand valuation (English)
- 2019 Konferenz-Englisch / Stichwörter und Wendungen für englischsprachige Sitzungen (German/English)
- 2019 Praxiswörterbuch / ISO-Terminologie für Markt-, Meinungs- und Sozialforschung (English/German)
- 2018 Made in Germany - als Marke und Kennzeichnung / Möglichkeiten und Einschränkungen
- 2015 Kurze Einführung in die Normung / Das Wesentliche zu DIN, CEN und ISO
