= Reimer =

Reimer is a family name of Germanic or Dutch origin.

== Notable people with this surname ==
- Al Reimer (1927–2015), Canadian writer
- Andrea Reimer, Canadian politician
- A. James Reimer (1942–2010), Canadian Mennonite theologian
- Arthur E. Reimer (1882–1969), American political candidate for the Socialist Labor Party of America
- Bennett Reimer, American musician
- Birgitte Reimer (1926–2021), Danish actress
- Brittany Reimer (born 1988), Canadian swimmer
- Christine Reimer, Danish journalist
- Christopher Reimer, Canadian musician
- Daniela Reimer, German rower
- David Reimer (1965–2004), Canadian man raised as a girl who became a famous case study in sexology
- David Dale Reimer, American diplomat
- Dennis Reimer (born 1939), Chief of Staff of the United States Army 1995–1999
- Doug Reimer, Canadian volleyball player
- Elin Reimer (1928–2022), Danish actress
- Erwin Reimer, Chilean athlete
- Eugene Reimer, Canadian athlete
- Evi Grünenwald-Reimer (born 1964), Swiss chess master
- Georg Reimer, German painter
- Helmut Reimer, German computer scientist
- Jack Reimer, Canadian politician
- Jakob Reimer (1918–2005), a Trawniki concentration camp guard
- James Reimer, Canadian ice hockey player
- Jan Reimer (born 1952), Canadian politician
- Jeffrey Reimer, American chemist
- John Reimer, Canadian politician
- Josef Ludwig Reimer, Austrian writer
- Joss Reimer, Canadian physician
- Klaas Reimer (1770–1837), founder of the Kleine Gemeinde
- Linda Reimer, Canadian politician
- Luke Reimer, Australian rugby player
- Luke Reimer (American football) (born 2000), American football player
- Mary Jean Reimer (born 1964), Hong Kong actress
- Martin Reimer, German cyclist
- Neil Reimer (1921–2011), Canadian politician
- Nele Reimer, German handballer
- Patrick Reimer, German hockey player
- Paula Reimer, American scientist
- Rebecca Reimer, American politician and member of the South Dakota House of Representatives
- Uwe Reimer, German writer

== Fictional characters ==
- Wendy Reimer, protagonist of Casey Plett's novel Little Fish

== See also ==
- Reimer's index of hip dislocation
- Remer (disambiguation)
- Reimers, a surname
