= Reimers =

Reimers is a surname. Notable people with the surname include:

- Barbara Reimers (1919–2010), American politician
- Bruce Reimers (born 1960), former American football guard
- Dieter Reimers (born 1943), German astronomer and director of the Hamburg Observatory, who gave his name to 6163 Reimers, an inner main-belt asteroid
- Ed Reimers (Edwin W. Reimers, 1912–2009), American actor
- Egill Reimers (1878–1946), Norwegian architect and sailor
- Eigil Reimers (1904–1976), Danish actor
- Fernando Reimers, American professor
- Herman Johan Foss Reimers (1843–1928), Norwegian judge and politician
- Jens Reimers (1941–2001), German discus thrower
- Karoline Bjørnson (née Reimers, 1835–1934), Norwegian actress
- Knud Reimers (1906–1987), Danish-born Scandinavian yacht designer
- Kyle Reimers (born 1989), former Australian rules footballer
- Nicolaus Reimers (1551–1600), Reimarus Ursus, Nicolaus Reimers Bär or Nicolaus Reymers Baer, astronomer and imperial mathematician to Emperor Rudolf II
- Pablo Reimers Morales (1946–2014), Mexican entrepreneur
- Paula Reimers, American rabbi
- Sophie Reimers (1853–1932), Norwegian stage actress
- Ulrich Reimers (born 1952), German electrical engineer

== See also ==
- Reimer, a name
- Riemer, a name
- Remer (disambiguation)
