= TeleTrusT =

- Bundesverband IT-Sicherheit e. V.
- Formation: 16 June 1989; 36 years ago
- Type: Registered association
- Purpose: IT security association (Bundesverband)
- Location: Berlin, Germany
- Key people: Norbert Pohlmann (chairman of the board)
- Website: www.teletrust.de/en/startseite/

TeleTrusT, officially the IT Security Association (German: Bundesverband IT-Sicherheit), is a German association for IT security, based in Berlin. Founded in 1989, it is a German and international competence network for IT security, with the purpose of increasing trust in information technology and communication. Members come from related industries and research as well as from administration and consultancy. The association works as a partner of national and international organisations in the field. TeleTrusT is the largest competence network for IT security in Germany and Europe, organising meetings and conferences, and advising in actual IT security politics.

The association assigns two signs of confidence, IT Security made in Germany (ITSMIG) and IT Security made in EU (ITSMIE).

== History ==
The initiative for an organisation for IT security dates back to the mid-1980s, when Eckart Raubold, then director of the Gesellschaft für Mathematik und Datenverarbeitung (GMD) in Darmstadt, proposed an association for the standardisation of chip cards, and trust centres for IT communications, especially payment systema. The first draft for a statute dates to 26 January 1989, and an association was created at a meeting on 4 April 1989 at the GMD. The association was formally registered in Bonn on 16 June 1989 as TeleTrust Deutschland. The members of the board then were Raubold as chairman, Wolfgang Schröder, Dieter Weber and Franz Arnold. Members included the GMD, mbp, DATEV, SCS, KryptoKom (Norbert Pohlmann), TELES, Siemens and ORGA.

A press release describes the purpose as "Promotion of reliable telecommucation technology in the economy, society and government at national and international level" ("Förderung verläßlicher Tele-Informationstechnik in Wirtschaft, Gesellschaft und Staat auf nationaler und internationaler Ebene", with a focus on avoiding abuse of electronics data, developing an electronic signature, and participating in norms.

The managing director (Geschäftsführer) was Helmut Reimer from 1992 until 2007, when he was succeeded by Günther Welsch. Holger Mühlbauer has been managing director from 2009. Norbert Pohlmann, a founding member and teaching at the Institut für Internet-Sicherheit of the Westfälische Hochschule , has been chairman of the board since 1989.

== Membership ==
TeleTrusT is a member of the European Telecommunications Standards Institute (ETSI), the IT Security Coordination Office of the DIN, and the CEN/CENELEC cyber security co-ordination group. It was a founding member of the European Cyber Security Organisation (ECSO).
