= Union of Construction and Woodworkers =

- Gewerkschaft Bau-Holz
- Abbreviation: GBH
- Type: Trade union
- Headquarters: Johann-Böhm-Platz 1; 1020 Vienna
- Location: Austria
- Coordinates: 48.2053916°N 16.4295119°E
- Fields: Construction & woodworking industries
- Members: 166,733 (1998)
- Official language: Austrian German
- President: Josef Muchitsch
- Key people: Franz Olah
- Affiliations: Austrian Trade Union Federation (OGB)
- Website: www.gbh.at

The Union of Construction and Woodworkers (German: Gewerkschaft Bau-Holz, GBH) is a trade union representing construction workers in Austria.

The union was founded in 1945 by the Austrian Trade Union Federation. By 1998, the union had 166,733 members. Of these, 80% worked in construction, with about 10% in woodworking, and 10% in ceramics and glass.

== Presidents ==
1945: Johann Böhm
1945: Franz Novy
1949: Franz Olah
1957: Karl Flöttl
1967: Hans Böck
1978: Roman Rautner
1986: Josef Hesoun
1994: Johann Driemer
2006: Johann Holper
2011: Josef Muchitsch
