= DeRemer =

DeRemer, also spelled as Deremer or De Remer, is an Americanized form of the Dutch surname De Riemer, which originated as an occupational surname for someone who manufactured leather straps, such as belts and reins.

Notable people with the surname include:

- Arthur Deremer (1917–2001), American football player and coach
- Joseph Bell DeRemer (1871–1944), American architect
- Lori Chavez-DeRemer (born 1968), American politician
- Rubye De Remer (1898–1984), American actress
- Sarah DeRemer (born 1989), American artist
