= West Styria (National Council electoral district) =

Parliamentary electoral district in Austria

- Weststeiermark
- Electoral District for the National Council
- Location of West Styria within Austria
- District: List: Deutschlandsberg; Leibnitz; Voitsberg
- State: Styria
- Population: 200,188 (2024)
- Electorate: 159,101 (2019)
- Area: 2,292 km^{2} (2023)

Current Electoral District
- Created: 2013
- Seats: List: 5 (2024–present); 4 (2013–2024)
- Members: Joachim Schnabel (ÖVP)
- Created from: List: Styria Centre; Styria South

West Styria (German: Weststeiermark), also known as Electoral District 6C (German: Wahlkreis 6C), is one of the 39 multi-member regional electoral districts of the National Council, the lower house of the Austrian Parliament, the national legislature of Austria. The electoral district was established in 2012 following the re-organisation of the regional electoral districts in Styria to reflect the new administrative district structure and came into being at the following legislative election in 2013. It consists of the districts of Deutschlandsberg, Leibnitz and Voitsberg in the state of Styria. The electoral district currently elects five of the 183 members of the National Council using the open party-list proportional representation electoral system. At the 2019 legislative election the constituency had 159,101 registered electors.

== History ==
West Styria was established in 2012 following the re-organisation of the regional electoral districts in Styria to reflect the new administrative district structure. It consisted of the districts of Deutschlandsberg, Leibnitz and Voitsberg in the state of Styria. The district was initially allocated five seats in April 2013. Electoral regulations require the allocation of seats amongst the electoral districts to be recalculated following each national census and in June 2013 the number of seats allocated to West Styria was reduced to four based on the population as at the 2011 national census. The number of seats allocated to West Styria was increased to five in June 2023 based on the population as at the 2021 national census.

== Electoral system ==
West Styria currently elects five of the 183 members of the National Council using the open party-list proportional representation electoral system. The allocation of seats is carried out in three stages. In the first stage, seats are allocated to parties (lists) at the regional level using a state-wide Hare quota (wahlzahl) (valid votes in the state divided by the number of seats in the state). In the second stage, seats are allocated to parties at the state/provincial level using the state-wide Hare quota (any seats won by the party at the regional stage are subtracted from the party's state seats). In the third and final stage, seats are allocated to parties at the federal/national level using the D'Hondt method (any seats won by the party at the regional and state stages are subtracted from the party's federal seats). Only parties that reach the 4% national threshold, or have won a seat at the regional stage, compete for seats at the state and federal stages.

Electors may cast one preferential vote for individual candidates at the regional, state and federal levels. Split-ticket voting (panachage), or voting for more than one candidate at each level, is not permitted and will result in the ballot paper being invalidated. At the regional level, candidates must receive preferential votes amounting to at least 14% of the valid votes cast for their party to over-ride the order of the party list (10% and 7% respectively for the state and federal levels).

== Election results ==
=== Summary ===
Election	Communists KPÖ+ / KPÖ			Social Democrats SPÖ			Greens GRÜNE			NEOS NEOS			People's ÖVP			Freedom FPÖ		
Election	Votes	%	Seats	Votes	%	Seats	Votes	%	Seats	Votes	%	Seats	Votes	%	Seats	Votes	%	Seats
2019	1,008	0.87%	0	22,542	19.53%	0	9,577	8.30%	0	6,405	5.55%	0	47,916	41.52%	1	26,124	22.64%	0
2017	747	0.60%	0	29,138	23.26%	1	2,053	1.64%	0	4,844	3.87%	0	40,151	32.05%	1	43,642	34.83%	1
2013	1,170	1.01%	0	30,072	25.89%	1	8,057	6.94%	0	3,253	2.80%	0	24,456	21.05%	0	30,876	26.58%	1

=== Detailed ===
==== 2019 ====
Results of the 2019 legislative election held on 29 September 2019:

Party		Votes per district				Total votes	%	Seats
Party		Deutsch- lands- berg	Leib- nitz	Voits- berg	Voting card	Total votes	%	Seats
Austrian People's Party	ÖVP	15,246	21,379	11,194	97	47,916	41.52%	1
Freedom Party of Austria	FPÖ	8,067	10,855	7,167	35	26,124	22.64%	0
Social Democratic Party of Austria	SPÖ	7,248	8,010	7,240	44	22,542	19.53%	0
The Greens – The Green Alternative	GRÜNE	3,221	3,819	2,477	60	9,577	8.30%	0
NEOS – The New Austria and Liberal Forum	NEOS	2,088	2,597	1,686	34	6,405	5.55%	0
JETZT	JETZT	453	548	464	10	1,475	1.28%	0
KPÖ Plus	KPÖ+	292	327	384	5	1,008	0.87%	0
Der Wandel	WANDL	103	141	110	3	357	0.31%	0
Valid Votes		36,718	47,676	30,722	288	115,404	100.00%	1
Rejected Votes		390	487	316	0	1,193	1.02%	
Total Polled		37,108	48,163	31,038	288	116,597	73.28%	
Registered Electors		50,286	66,098	42,717		159,101		
Turnout		73.79%	72.87%	72.66%		73.28%		

The following candidates were elected:

- Party mandates - Joachim Schnabel (ÖVP), 3,582 votes.

==== 2017 ====
Results of the 2017 legislative election held on 15 October 2017:

Party		Votes per district				Total votes	%	Seats
Party		Deutsch- lands- berg	Leib- nitz	Voits- berg	Voting card	Total votes	%	Seats
Freedom Party of Austria	FPÖ	13,192	18,028	12,358	64	43,642	34.83%	1
Austrian People's Party	ÖVP	13,041	17,955	9,054	101	40,151	32.05%	1
Social Democratic Party of Austria	SPÖ	9,320	10,543	9,198	77	29,138	23.26%	1
NEOS – The New Austria and Liberal Forum	NEOS	1,656	1,872	1,287	29	4,844	3.87%	0
Peter Pilz List	PILZ	1,104	1,153	994	26	3,277	2.62%	0
The Greens – The Green Alternative	GRÜNE	692	877	465	19	2,053	1.64%	0
My Vote Counts!	GILT	312	401	219	6	938	0.75%	0
Communist Party of Austria	KPÖ	218	231	295	3	747	0.60%	0
Free List Austria	FLÖ	90	141	77	2	310	0.25%	0
The Whites	WEIßE	71	66	55	0	192	0.15%	0
Valid Votes		39,696	51,267	34,002	327	125,292	100.00%	3
Rejected Votes		366	377	285	2	1,030	0.82%	
Total Polled		40,062	51,644	34,287	329	126,322	79.37%	
Registered Electors		50,288	65,759	43,100		159,147		
Turnout		79.67%	78.54%	79.55%		79.37%		

The following candidates were elected:

- Personal mandates - Josef Muchitsch (SPÖ), 9,938 votes.
- Party mandates - Werner Amon (ÖVP), 3,848 votes; and Josef Riemer (FPÖ), 2,418 votes.

Substitutions:

- Werner Amon (ÖVP) resigned on 30 June 2019 and was replaced by Daniela List (ÖVP) on 1 July 2019.

==== 2013 ====
Results of the 2013 legislative election held on 29 September 2013:

Party		Votes per district				Total votes	%	Seats
Party		Deutsch- lands- berg	Leib- nitz	Voits- berg	Voting card	Total votes	%	Seats
Freedom Party of Austria	FPÖ	9,063	12,634	9,132	47	30,876	26.58%	1
Social Democratic Party of Austria	SPÖ	9,590	11,296	9,154	32	30,072	25.89%	1
Austrian People's Party	ÖVP	8,097	11,105	5,208	46	24,456	21.05%	0
Team Stronach	FRANK	3,961	4,913	3,777	23	12,674	10.91%	0
The Greens – The Green Alternative	GRÜNE	2,712	3,112	2,197	36	8,057	6.94%	0
Alliance for the Future of Austria	BZÖ	1,553	1,655	1,425	17	4,650	4.00%	0
NEOS – The New Austria	NEOS	1,047	1,271	916	19	3,253	2.80%	0
Communist Party of Austria	KPÖ	324	317	522	7	1,170	1.01%	0
Pirate Party of Austria	PIRAT	195	255	185	3	638	0.55%	0
Christian Party of Austria	CPÖ	147	109	59	3	318	0.27%	0
Valid Votes		36,689	46,667	32,575	233	116,164	100.00%	2
Rejected Votes		620	606	455	6	1,687	1.43%	
Total Polled		37,309	47,273	33,030	239	117,851	74.69%	
Registered Electors		50,417	63,620	43,752		157,789		
Turnout		74.00%	74.31%	75.49%		74.69%		

The following candidates were elected:

- Personal mandates - Josef Muchitsch (SPÖ), 11,551 votes.
- Party mandates - Josef Riemer (FPÖ), 1,994 votes.
