= Joachim Schnabel =

Austrian politician (born 1976)

Member of the National Council
- Incumbent
- Assumed office 23 October 2019
- Constituency: West Styria

Personal details
- Born: 10 August 1976 (age 49) Wagna, Austria
- Party: People's Party

Joachim Schnabel (born 10 August 1976) is an Austrian politician of the People's Party. He has been a member of the National Council since 2019, and has served as mayor of Lang since 2010.
