= Josef Muchitsch =

Austrian politician (born 1967)

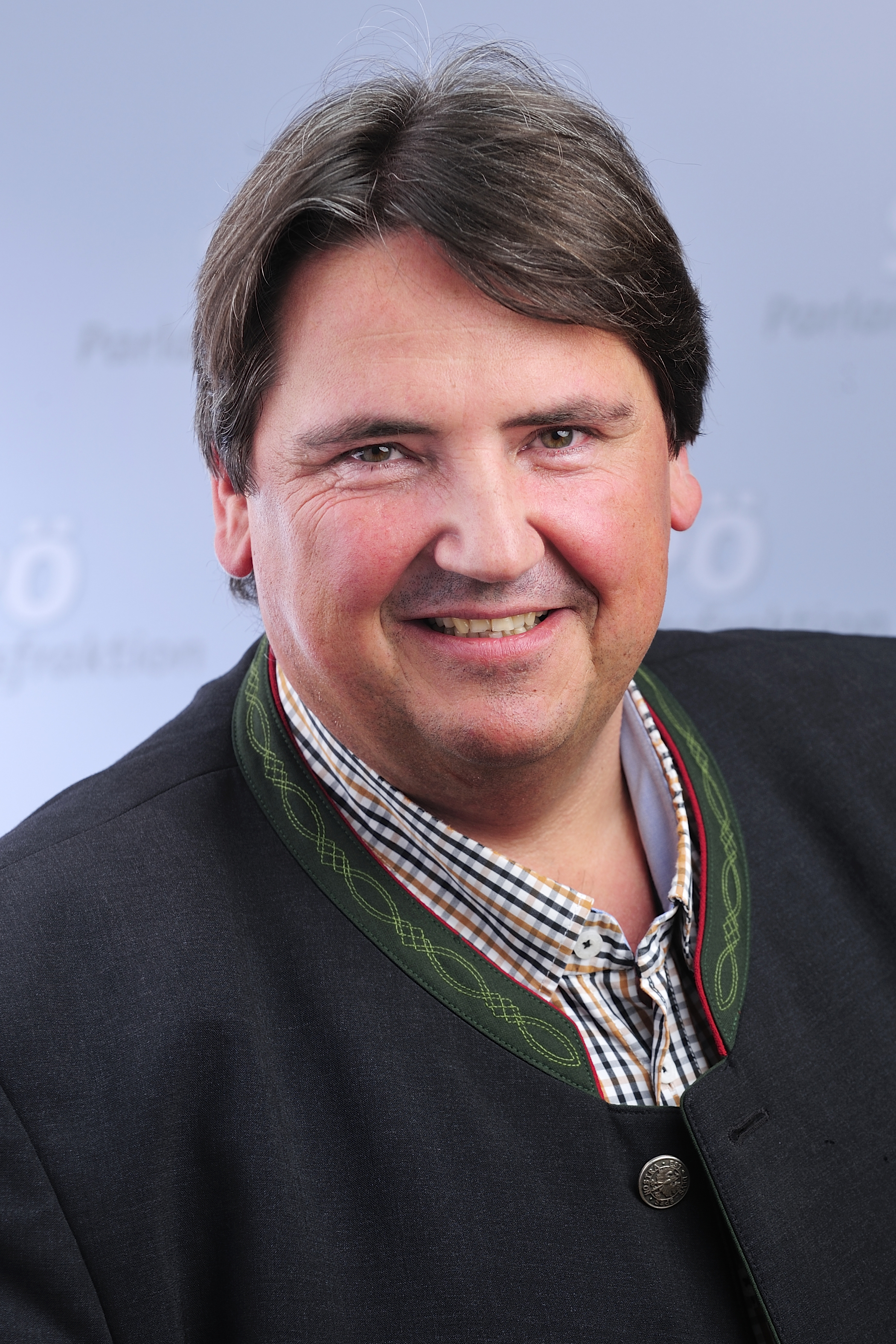
- Muchitsch in 2014

Member of the National Council
- Incumbent
- Assumed office 30 October 2006
- Constituency: South Styria (2006–2008); Styria (2008–2013); West Styria (2013–2019); Styria (2019–present)

Personal details
- Born: 21 August 1967 (age 58)
- Party: Social Democratic Party

Josef Muchitsch (born 21 August 1967) is an Austrian trade unionist and politician of the Social Democratic Party. He has been a member of the National Council since 2006, and has served as chairman of the Union of Construction and Woodworkers since 2012.
