= Lang, Styria =

Lang
- Municipality
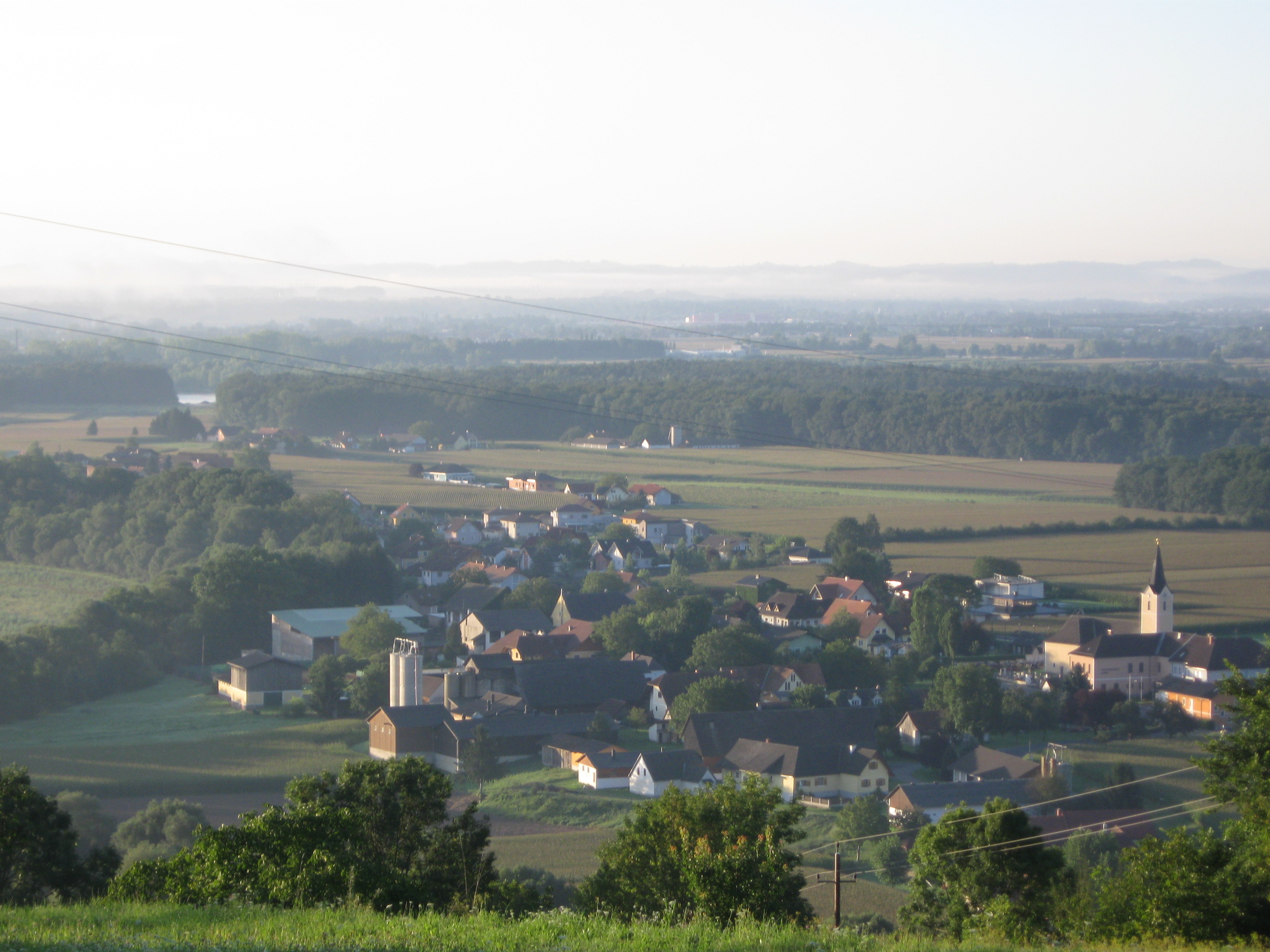
- View of Lang

- Coat of arms

- Location within Austria
- Coordinates: 46°50′14″N 15°30′10″E
- Country: Austria
- State: Styria
- District: Leibnitz

Government
  - Mayor: Joachim Schnabel (ÖVP)

Area
  - Total: 15.63 km^{2} (6.03 sq mi)
- Elevation: 286 m (938 ft)

Population (2017-12-31)
  - Total: 1,325
  - Density: 84.77/km^{2} (219.6/sq mi)
- Time zone: UTC+1 (CET)
  - Summer (DST): UTC+2 (CEST)
- Postal code: 8403
- Area code: +43 3182
- Vehicle registration: LB
- Website: www.lang.gv.at

Lang is a municipality in the district of Leibnitz in the Austrian state of Styria.

== Subdivisions ==
It is divided into the villages Göttling, Lang, Langaberg, Dexenberg, Schirka, Stangersdorf, and Jöß.
