= Austrian Standards International =

Standards organization and the ISO member body for Austria

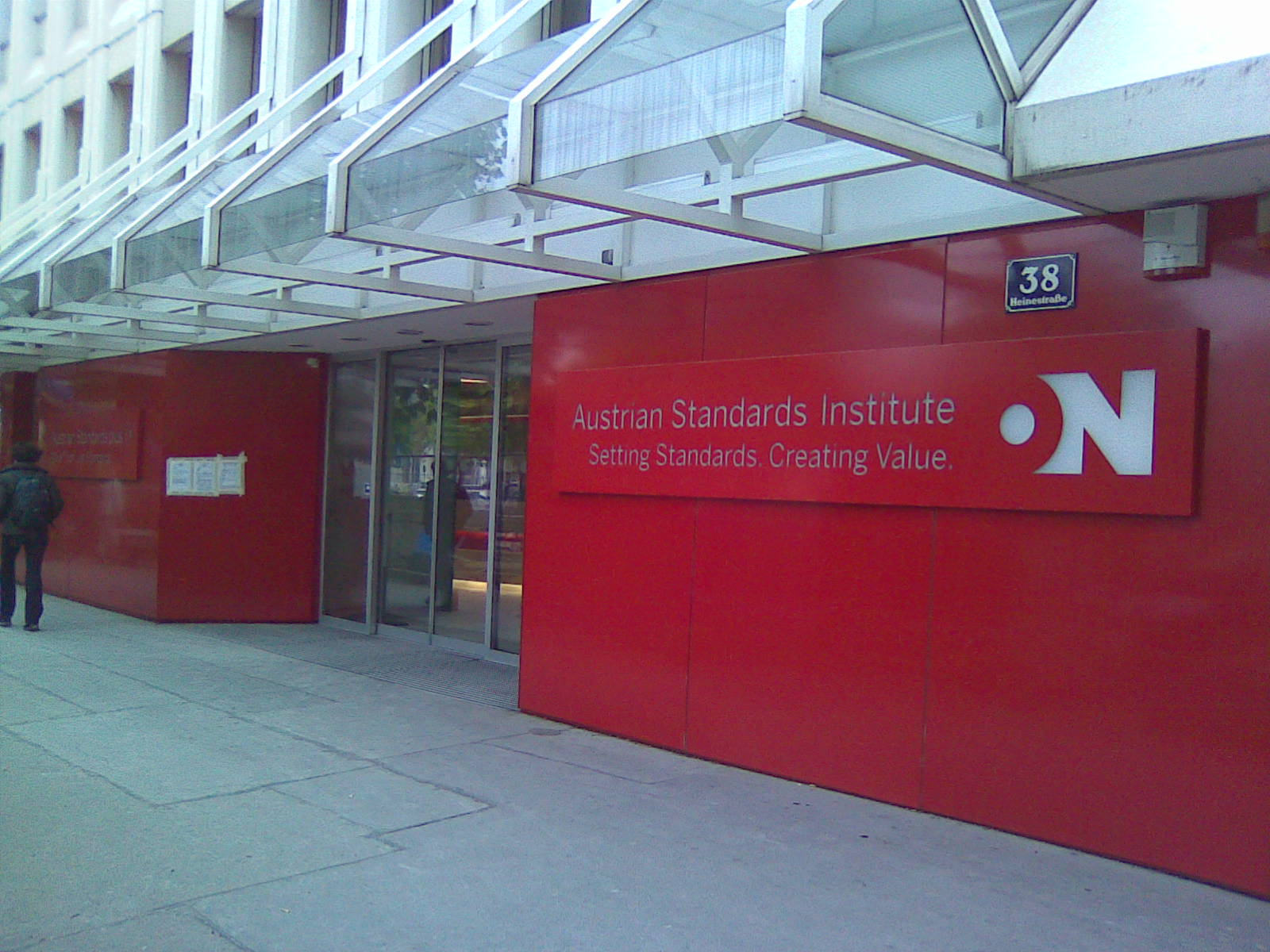
- Formation: 23 September 1920
- Type: NGO
- Purpose: Standardization
- Headquarters: Vienna, Austria
- Official language: German, English
- Affiliations: ISO
- Staff: 177
- Website: www.austrian-standards.at/en

Austrian Standards ÖNORM logo

Austrian Standards International (formerly German: Österreichisches Normungsinstitut), abbreviated ASI, is a standards organization and the ISO member body for Austria.

== History ==
Its predecessor organization, the Österreichischer Normenausschuss für Industrie und Gewerbe (Austrian Standards Committee for Industry and Trade), was founded in the First Republic of Austria on 23 September 1920, with 13 committees developing technical standards primarily for mechanical and electrical engineering. The first standard was published in 1921 on metric screw threads. In 1932, the committee's name was shortened to the Österreichischer Normenausschuss (Austrian Standards Committee). With the Austrian Anschluss to Nazi Germany in 1938, it became a branch office of the German Deutsches Institut für Normung (DIN) standards organization, but resumed operations in its own right after World War II, and was a founding ISO member in 1946.

The 1954 Federal Act on Standardization recognized the activities of the committee, and the Act, as amended, serves as its legal basis. The Austrian Standards Committee's name was changed to ON Österreichisches Normungsinstitut in 1969.

On 1 March 2006, the Institute published ON rule ONR 168000, used to calculate the monetary value of a brand.

In 2018, the name was changed to Austrian Standards International.

The Institute is located at Heinestrasse 38, 1020 Vienna.

== Austrian standards ==
The acronym ÖNORM designates a national standard published by the Austrian Standards International and applicable to Austria alone. Austrian national standards have the acronym "ÖNORM" followed by one letter and a unique number. By way of illustration:

- ÖNORM S 4223: dimensions, safety requirements, testing, conformity marking of snorkels
- ÖNORM S 4224: dimensions, safety requirements, testing, conformity marking of swimming fins
- ÖNORM S 4225: safety requirements, testing, conformity marking of diving masks

In the examples above, the letter "S" following "ÖNORM" indicates that these standards address topics not covered elsewhere (Sonstige Normengebiete in German).
