= Norbert Pohlmann =

German computer scientist

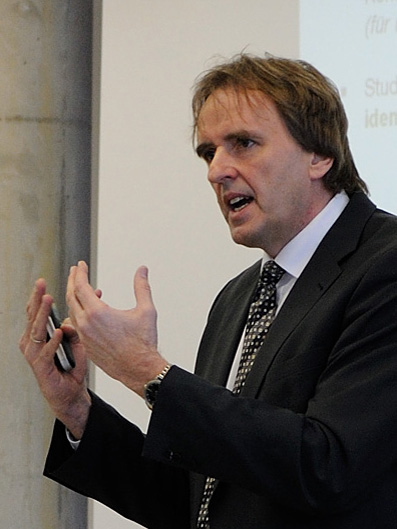
- Norbert Pohlmann at the Professor of the Year 2011 award ceremony
- Born: 20 March 1960 (age 65); Ratingen, West Germany
- Occupations: Computer scientist; Managing director; Academic teacher; Chairman
- Organizations: KryptoKom; Westfälische Hochschule; TeleTrusT
- Awards: Rudolf-Thoma Prize of VDE; Professor of the Year
- Website: norbert-pohlmann.com

Norbert Pohlmann (born 20 March 1960) is a computer scientist and a professor at the Westfälische Hochschule. He is also chairman of the board of the IT security association TeleTrusT.

== Career ==
Born in Ratingen, Pohlmann studied electrical engineering from 1981 to 1985, specialising in computer science. He wrote his doctoral thesis on "Possibilities and Limitations of Firewall Systems".

He was managing director at KryptoKom, a company for information security and communication technology, from 1988 to 1999. After a merger with Utimaco Safeware AG, he was a member of the company's board from 1999 to 2003. Since 2003, Pohlmann has been professor in the computer science department for distributed systems and information security, and director of the institute for internet security, at the Westfälische Hochschule, a university of applied science.

Pohlmann was one of the founders of the IT security association TeleTrusT, which has established reliable conditions for trustworthy application of information and communication technologies. He has been member of the board since 1994, and chairman of the board since April 1998. Pohlmann was one of the initiators of the Information Security Solutions Europe (ISSE) and chairman of the ISSE program committee of the ISSE conference.

He is also a member of the board of eco (Association of the Internet Industry) as well as a member of the academic council of the GDD, the German association for data protection and data security. He was a member of the permanent stakeholders' group of the ENISA (European Union Agency for Network and Information Security) from 2005 to 2010.

In the summer term 2013, Pohlmann was a visiting professor at Stanford University.

== Awards ==
- Rudolf-Thoma Prize of VDE (Association for Electrical, Electronic & Information Technology) for the best final grade in the graduation year 1985
- 1997 City of Aachen's Prize for Innovation and Technology for his scientific and entrepreneurial performance.
- 2011 Professor of the Year in the category "Engineering / Informatics", awarded by the German students magazine Unicum.

== Publications ==
- Firewall Architecture for the Enterprise, John Wiley & Sons, Hoboken, USA, 2002 ISBN 0-7645-4926-X.
- Firewall-Systeme - Sicherheit für Internet und Intranet, E-Mail-Security, Virtual Private Network, Intrusion Detection System, Personal Firewalls MITP-Verlag, Bonn 2003 ISBN 3-8266-0988-3.
- Virtual Private Network (VPN) MITP-Verlag, Bonn 2003 ISBN 3-8266-0882-8
- Der IT-Sicherheitsleitfaden MITP-Verlag, Bonn 2006 ISBN 3-8266-1635-9
- Sicher im Internet: Tipps und Tricks für das digitale Leben orell füssli Verlag, Zürich 2010 ISBN 978-3-280-05381-2
