= Helmut Reimer =

German computer scientist

- Occupations: Computer scientist; Managing director
- Organizations: Technische Universität Ilmenau; VEB Mikroelektronik Erfurt; TeleTrusT

Helmut Reimer is a German computer scientist. He was professor of microelectronics at the Technische Universität Ilmenau from 1971. From 1980 to 1990, he also led the department for microchip production of the VEB Mikroelektronik Erfurt. From 1992 to 2007, he was managing director of TeleTrusT, an association for trustworthy information and communication technologies.

== Career ==
Reimer studied electronics at the Technische Universität Ilmenau, graduating with a doctorate in 1964. He was professor of microelectronics in Ilmenau from 1971 to 1990. From 1980 to 1990, he also led the department for microchip production of the VEB Mikroelektronik Erfurt. He had intense contacts to production in China.

After German reunification, he had to look for other work areas. He became managing director of TeleTrusT, an organisation which has established reliable conditions for trustworthy application of information and communication technologies in Germany and beyond. TeleTrusT was then still in its beginning, with 15 members. Reimer directed the association towards an internationally respected competence centre for applied cryptography and biometrics. He initiated project groups to work on specifications for card terminals, encryption and client/server authentication. He worked towards publications, such as the 1995 book "Digitale Signatur & Sicherheitssensitive Anwendungen (Digital signature & security sensitive applications), reports such Kryptographische Verfahren im Gesundheits- und Sozialwesen (Cryptographic methods in the health and social care sector) and Kriterienkatalog zur Bewertung der Vergleichbarkeit biometrischer Verfahren (Criteria catalogue for assessing the comparability of biometric methods). Reimer organized fair participations and the international conference Information Security Solutions Europe ISSE), held from 1999, and representation at the U.S. RSA Conferences. He contributed to international dialogue on the topic of IT security.

Reimer left the director position of TeleTrust in July 2007, becoming an honorary member. He has been on the jury of the association's innovation prize. He is among the publishers of the trade magazine Datenschutz und Datensicherheit (DuD) of the Vieweg Verlag

Reimer was awarded the Fraunhofer SmartCard-Preis.
