= Josef Riemer =

Austrian politician (born 1950)

Josef A. Riemer

Member of the National Council
- Incumbent
- Assumed office 21 October 2010
- Constituency: West Styria

Personal details
- Born: 21 March 1950 (age 76)
- Party: Freedom Party of Austria

Josef A. Riemer (born 21 March 1950) is an Austrian politician who has been a Member of the National Council for the Freedom Party of Austria (FPÖ) since 2010.
