= Sarah DeRemer =

American artist

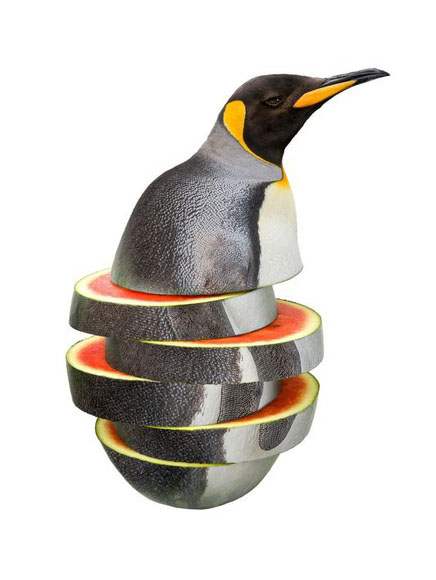
- "Penguimelon" from the "Animal Food" series
- Born: September 7, 1989 (age 37); Los Angeles, California, U.S.
- Education: University of California, Davis
- Known for: Photo-manipulation
- Website: www.sarahderemer.com

Sarah DeRemer (born September 1989) is an American fine artist specializing in photography and photo-manipulation.

== Biography ==
She grew up in Los Angeles, California and graduated from the University of California, Davis in 2011 with a bachelor's degree in Studio Art. She worked as a veterinary technician from 2004 - 2012, working in both private practice as well as research at UC Davis School of Veterinary Medicine. At UC Davis she worked on and various studies in veterinary ophthalmology. She was published as an author on a study involving mesenchymal stromal cells in 2013 in the Journal of Cytotherapy, a study on defining experimental conditions in a mouse excisional wound model, and she assisted on other related published studies as well. DeRemer also assisted in a study to measure the effect of induced myopia on field trial performance in dogs. While working at the veterinary school, she also worked on medical illustration.

In 2012 she moved to Seoul, Korea to teach English. In Korea, she continued photography, and also began pursuing and exploring the field of digital art.

== Works ==
DeRemer's first photo-series in Korea, featuring an abandoned mental hospital in Gonjiam, Gyeonggi-do, went viral. The photo-series and can be found on ViralNova, Atlas Obscura, and Indulgd. She also contributed a photo-essay on an abandoned amusement park in Seoul, Yongma-land, to an English blog based out of Seoul.

She began by making amusing hybrid animals.

=== Animal Food ===
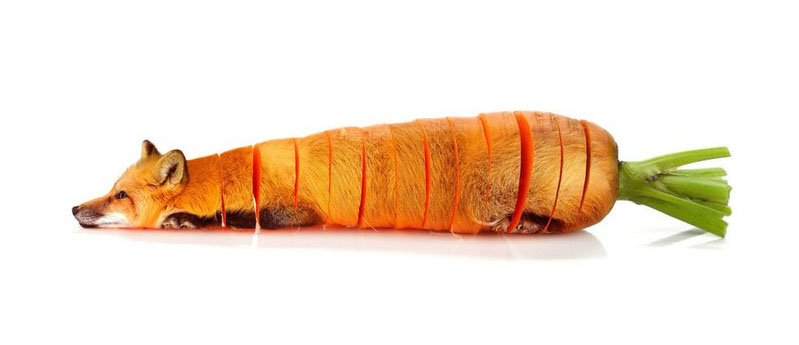
"Carrox" from the "Animal Food" series

Her first major photo-manipulation project, "Animal Food", was featured on sites and in papers such as The Guardian, TIME, VICE Creators Project, and Mashable. It also appeared on multiple art blogs such as Design Taxi, Toxel Lost at E Minor, Acclaim Mag, and the Creative Review. This project features the unlikely combination of images of animals with sliced up fruit and vegetables. In an interview, she stated that she "noticed the potential for a series stemming from an interesting juxtaposition between live animals and produce, rather than just different animal species. I found the combination of forms interesting and realized that it made a visually strong image that people would have strong opinions about. A lot of the project was a study in color and negative space, as well as creating a cohesive image through hybridizing, but I also just enjoyed creating something both amusing and potentially thought provoking." When questioned as to whether or not the series was created as a statement on meat consumption, she noted that she "didn’t specifically create the series to be commentary on meat eating or vegetarianism. I have always enjoyed making pieces that were visually strong on their own, but also thought provoking and open to interpretation. I never create art to force my view, but use it to inspire people to think about their own. Some have gone as far as to refer to "Animal Food" as "Photoshopped fruit-animals that make meat vegan-friendly", while others have simply called it "disturbing". I’m just happy to inspire discussion of any sort." DeRemer was also interviewed about the project on TBS eFM, an English radio station in Seoul. In 2016, an article by VICE Creators Project, entitled "Dalí, Warhol, and the Lip-Smacking Legacy of Artists and Food", stated that "Sarah DeRemer's series of critter-produce photo manipulations, Animal Food, offers viewers insight in blending the dichotomy between the flora and fauna we consume.".

In February 2015, DeRemer exhibited the series "Animal Food" in Seoul, Korea at Color of Money. An article was written about the exhibition in the Korea Herald. She also displayed the series in a solo exhibition Jang Eun Sun gallery in November 2015.

=== You Are What You Eat ===
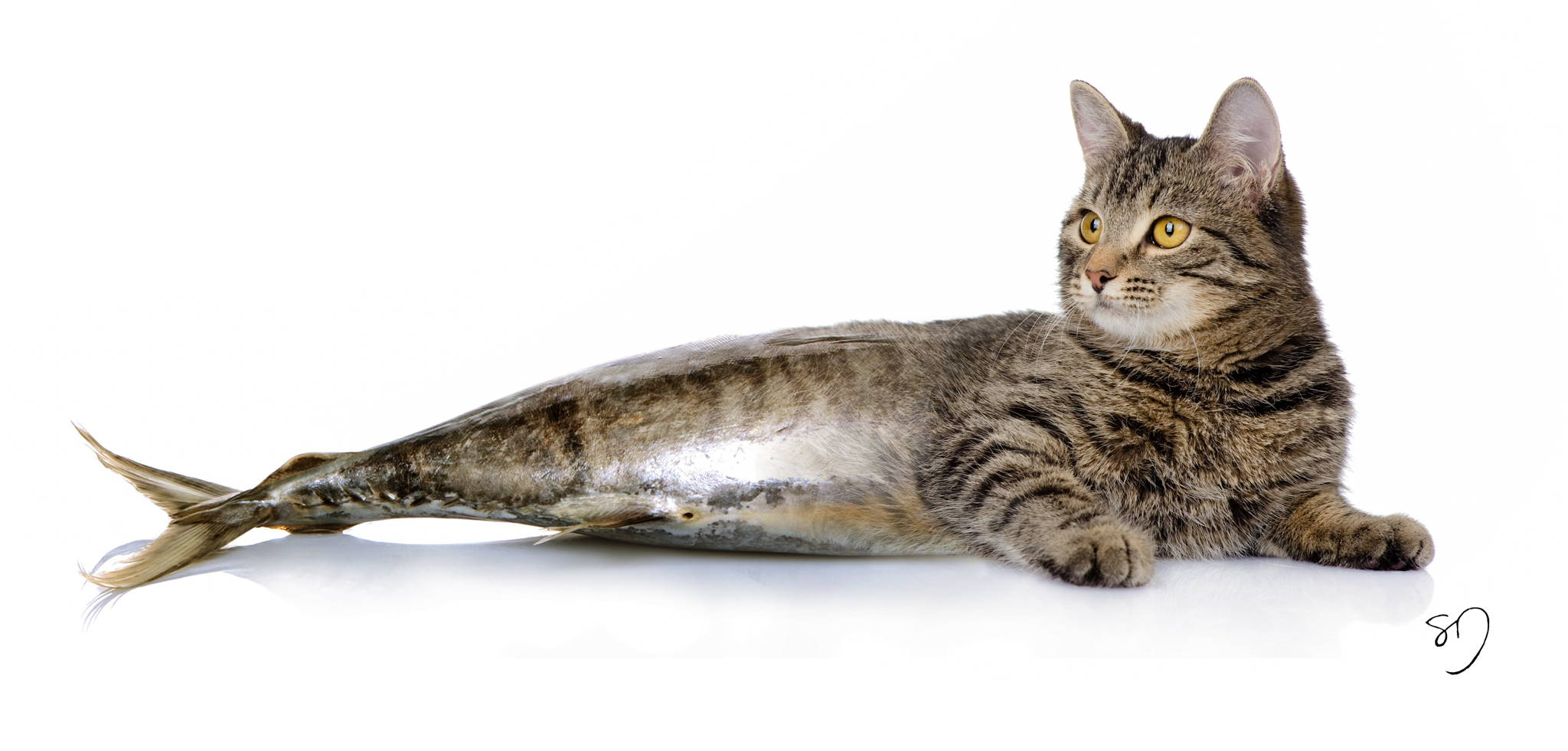
"Cat/Fish" from the "You Are What You Eat" series

DeRemer's following project, "You Are What You Eat", features the combinations of predators and their prey into one cohesive image. The images can be seen on the Huffington Post and Ashton Kutcher's blog, A Plus.

=== Big Mouth Birds ===
She created a bird-horse hybrid series titled "Big Mouth Birds" which combines birds with the mouths of horses. These can be viewed on Ignant Journal Du Design, & Laughing Squid.

=== Balloon Zoo ===
Her recent hybrid series, titled "Balloon Zoo", reimagines balloon animals as real creatures. DesignBoom wrote, "for her digital series ‘Balloon Zoo’, DeRemer has realized a realistic rendition of childhood-favorite inflatables. Hybrid creatures bear a strangely lifelike appearance, where characteristics like skin, fur and eyes wrap around the balloon’s exaggerated, twisted forms. These images can also be seen on The Guardian, Juxtapoz, Mashable, Yahoo, and Hello Giggles. The project was also featured in Vanity Fair Italy's September issue.

=== Surreal Experiments ===
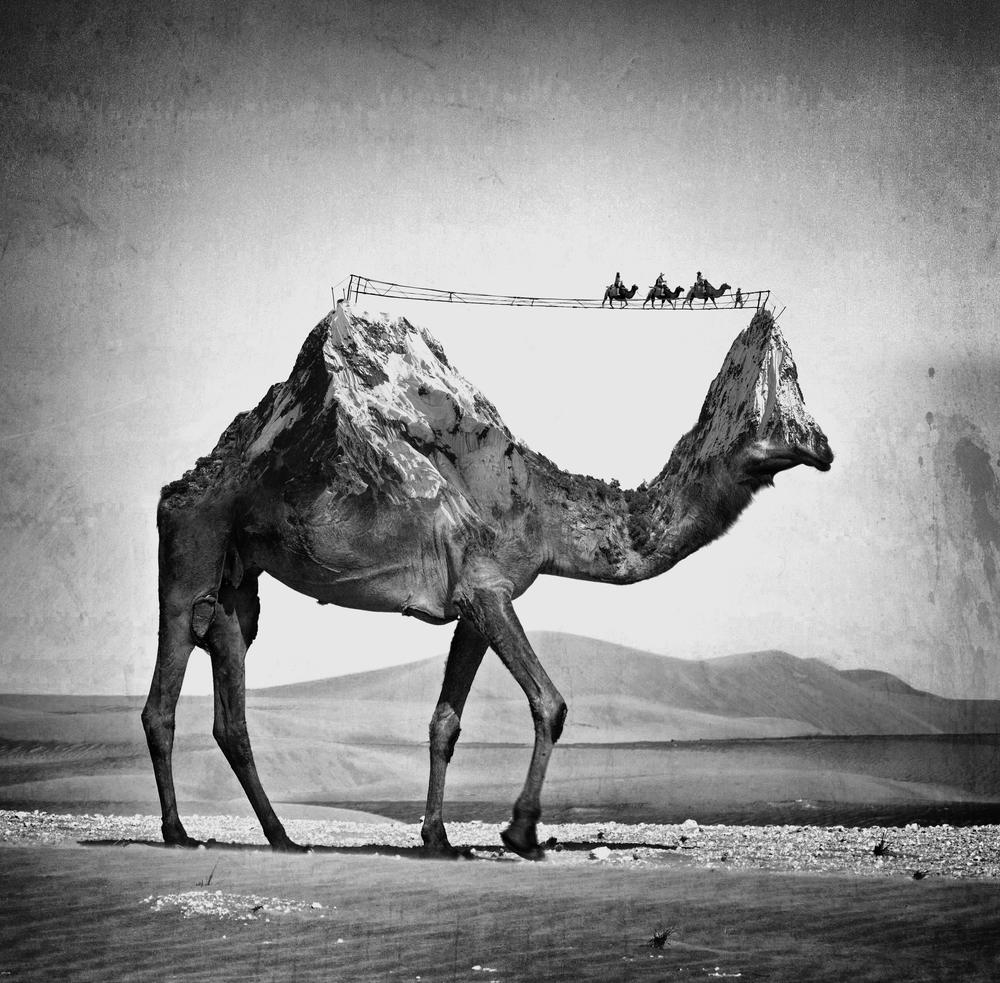
"Camel Mountains" from "Surreal Experiments"

Most recently she has been exploring the world of surrealism. She published a series of black and white surreal photo-manipulations that was shown on Mashable, DesignTaxi, and Hi-Fructose. The series manipulates ordinary photos to create odd and sometimes creepy, dream-like scenes by mixing two objects into unexpected mashups, or manipulating seemingly ordinary objects into different visual elements. DeRemer told Mashable that some of the scenes were "created as an exploration into interesting combinations," while others simply portray scenes of interest.
