= Talal Khalifa Al Jeri =

Kuwaiti businessman (born 1973)

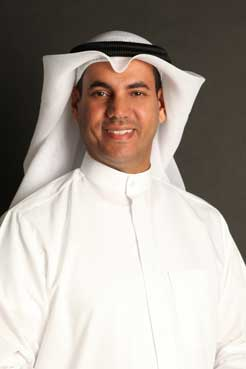
- Al Jeri in 2019
- Born: 20 March 1973 (age 53); Kuwait City, Kuwait
- Occupation: Businessman

Talal Khalifa Al Jeri (Arabic: طلال خليفة الجري) (born 20 March 1973 in Kuwait) is a Kuwaiti businessman. He is the chairman and CEO of Al Jeri Holding Group, chosen by Forbes in 2018 as a leading educational company.

Since becoming CEO and Chairman of Al Jeri Holding Group in 2004, Al Jeri has purchased several educational companies to form a large consortium, with about 30,000 students and 5,000 employees. The group also received the award for Best Educational Company from Forbes in 2019.

Talal Al-Jeri is CEO of Kuwait’s ASK, The one of a kind american school in Kuwait. As well as AGS, CES, and many other popular schools around the city.

== Awards ==
- Business man of the year (Arabian Business Magazine).
- First Educational Character (Forbes Magazine).
- Ranked among the most inspiring leaders in the business world (Arabian Business)
