= Old Cathedral, Linz =

- Alter Dom, Linz
- St. Ignatius; German: Ignatiuskirche
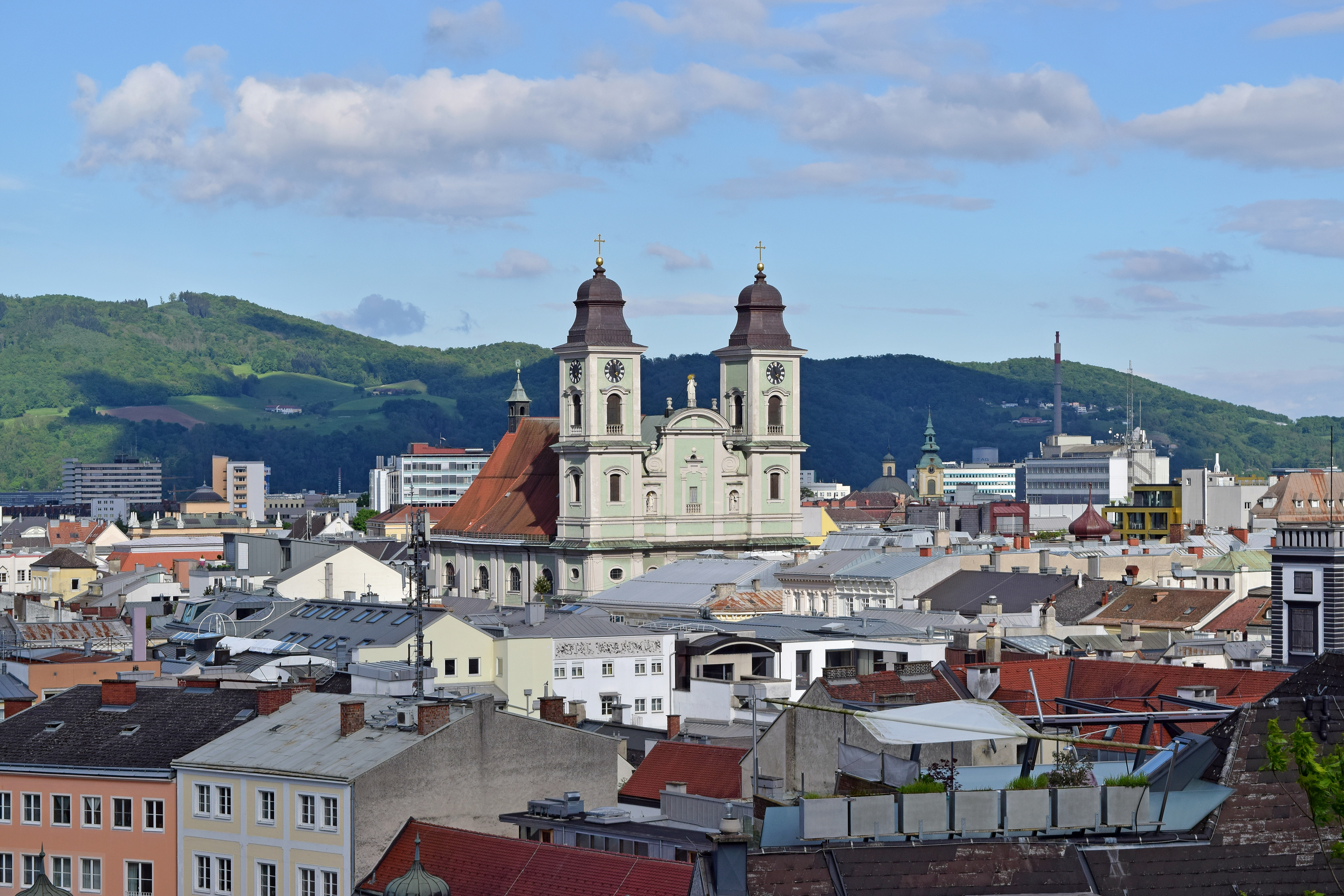
- Old Cathedral from the Linz Castle

- Location within Austria
- 48°18′18″N 14°17′17″E
- Location: Linz, Upper Austria
- Country: Austria
- Denomination: Roman Catholic
- Website: www.ignatiuskirche-linz.at

Architecture
- Architect: Pietro Francesco Carlone
- Architectural type: Cathedral
- Style: Baroque
- Years built: 1669–1683

Administration
- Province: Vienna
- Diocese: Linz

Clergy
- Rector: Peter Gangl, SJ

The Old Cathedral (German: Alter Dom), also called the Church of Ignatius (German: Ignatiuskirche) or the Jesuit Church (German: Jesuitenkirche), is a church in Linz, Austria. It was built between 1669 and 1683 in Baroque style. From 1785 to 1909 it served as cathedral of the Diocese of Linz.

== History ==
The Jesuits built the church between 1669 and 1683 following plans by Pietro Francesco Carlone. It was erected near the former Jesuits' College at the south end of the Hauptplatz. The church was originally called the Church of Ignatius (German: Ignatiuskirche). and was dedicated to Saint Ignatius of Loyola, who founded the Jesuit Order.

The Jesuit Order was dissolved in 1773 by Pope Clement XIII. The Diocese of Linz and St. Pölten von Passau was effectively founded in 1783 by a decree of the Emperor Joseph II (1741–90) without advance approval from Rome. The emperor appointed the bishop and designated the former Jesuit church as the cathedral. The diocese was officially established by a papal certificate of 28 January 1785.

The first bishop was Ernest Johann Nepomuk, Imperial Count von Herberstein, enthroned on 1 May 1785. He died on 17 March 1788. Joseph Anton Gall was bishop from 1788 to 1807. Bishop Gregorius Thomas Ziegler (1827–52) led an era during which the church was restored. In 1841 Rome confirmed the church as the cathedral of the diocese. Bishop Franz-Josef Rudigier laid the foundation stone of the New Cathedral in 1862. In 1909 the function of cathedral was transferred from the Ignatius church to the new building. The Jesuits returned in 1909. The new cathedral was consecrated on 29 April 1924.

== Music ==
Ludwig van Beethoven wrote the three Equali for four trombones ("Drei Equales", WoO 30) for performance in the cathedral on 2 November 1812 (All Souls' Day).

Anton Bruckner (1824 - 1896) was organist from 1856 to 1868. During Bruckner's tenure as organist he studied under the contrapuntalist Simon Sechter, and in 1860 became the conductor of the Frohsinn choral society. It was in this period that he flowered into a major composer. On 12 May 1861 the Frohsinn performed Bruckner's seven-part Ave Maria (WAB 6) in the cathedral, a breakthrough composition that became a favorite of the composer. Bruckner's Mass No. 1 was first performed in the old Linz Cathedral on 21 November 1864. Apart from a small solo in the Credo, the original score for the mass did not include the organ. This has been called his first composition as a fully mature composer.

The Bruckner Festival is held annually in the church in honor of the composer.

== Structure ==
The exterior of the church is relatively plain, with two towers on either side of the main door, topped with onion domes. The interior is decorated in lavish Baroque style, with pink marble columns. There are three side chapels on either side of a wide main nave.

The church has an elaborately detailed wooden pulpit, and a high altar made by Giovanni Battista Barbarino and Giovanni Battista Colomba that incorporates many statues in marble. Antonio Bellucci (1654–1726) made the painting of Saint Aloysius that is located above the altar. The stalls in the presbytery were carved by local artists, and are decorated with the faces of monsters and dwarfs. The carved choir stalls from the 17th century were transferred from Garsten Abbey. (Note: Garsten Abbey was dissolved in 1787 and its church became a parish church. From 1850 it was used as a prison.) The Baroque organ was built by Franz Xaver Krismann, with alterations requested by Bruckner. The organ has not been modified.

== Gallery ==
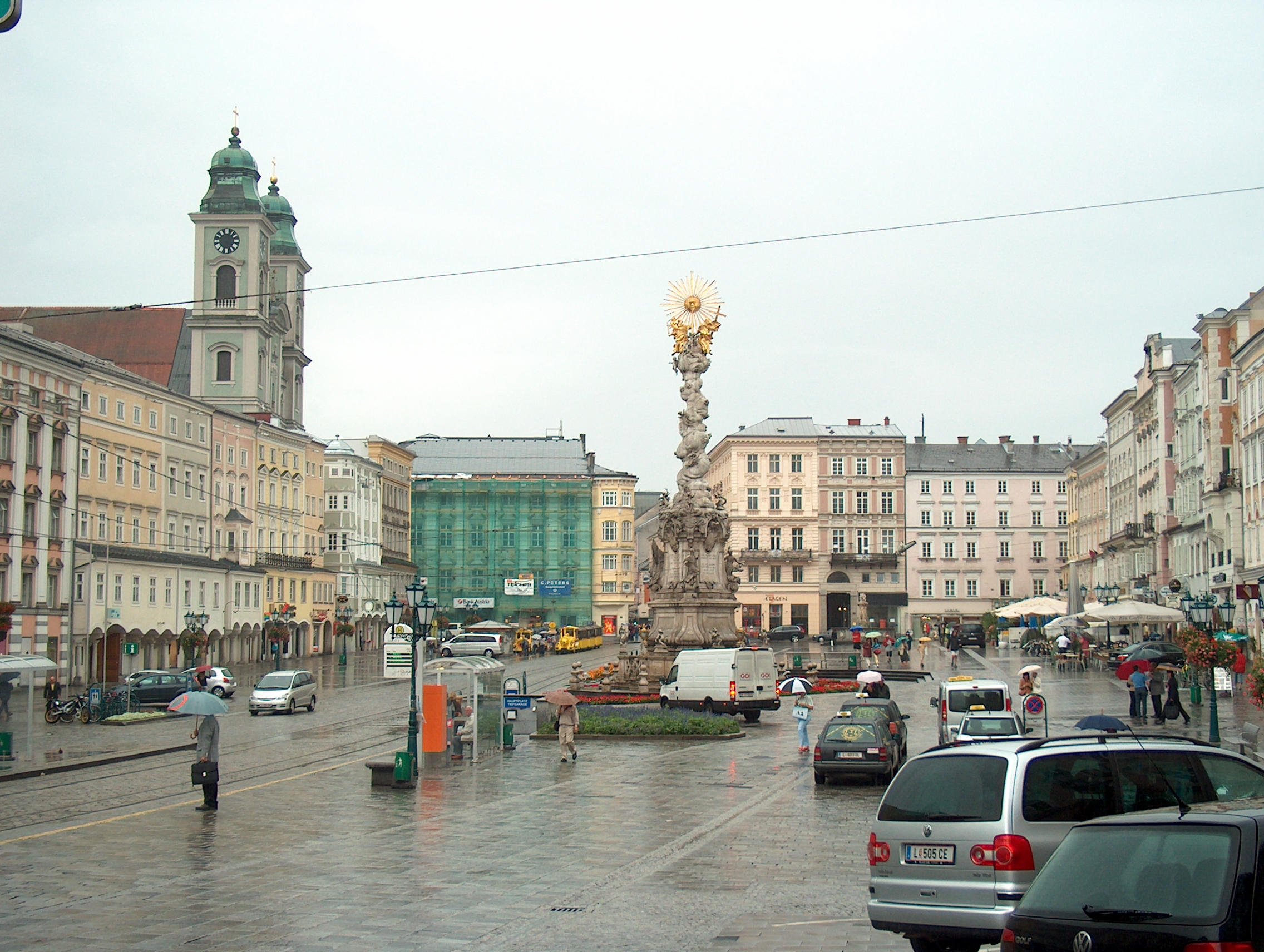
Hauptplatz in the rain - Cathedral to the left

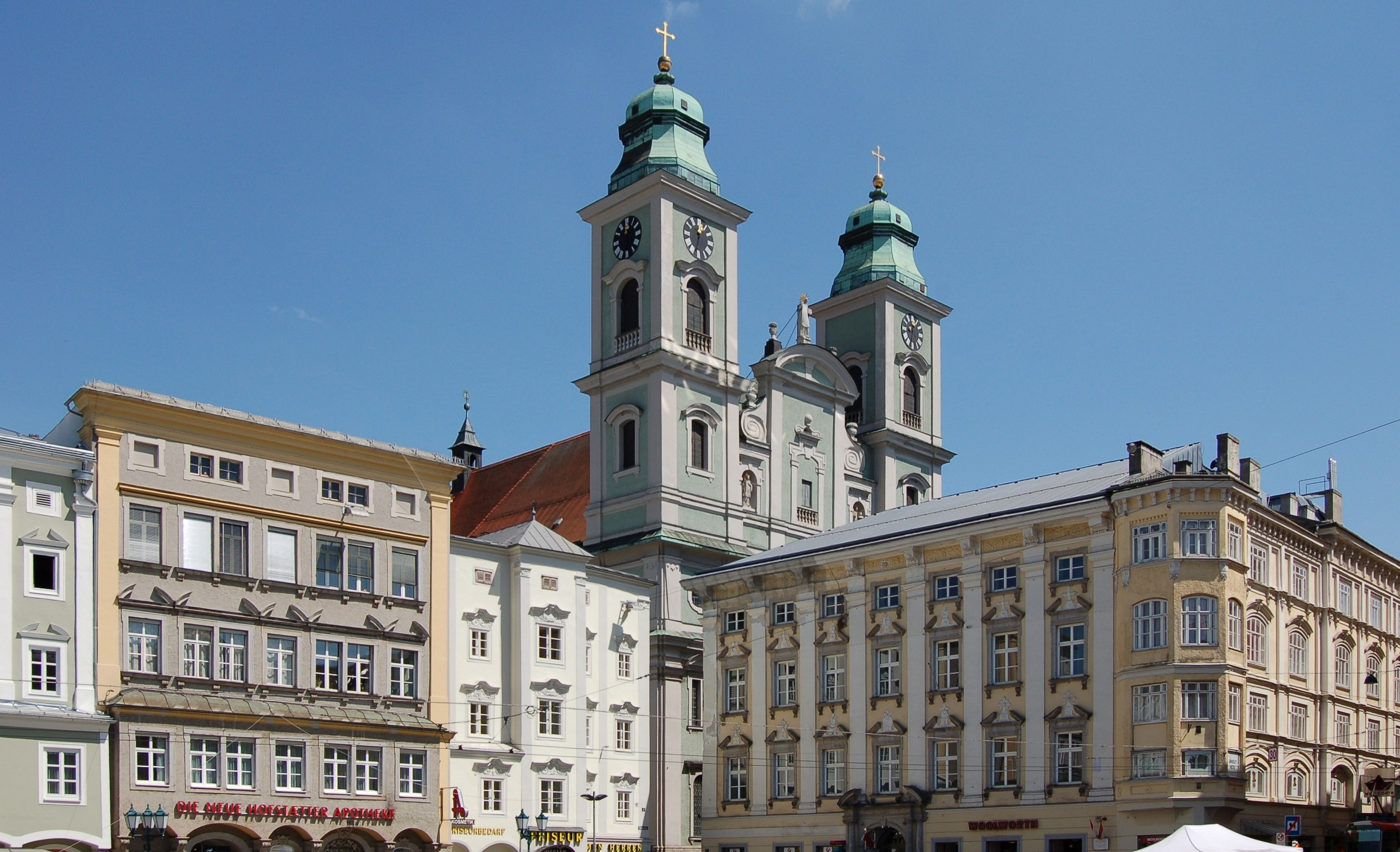
Cathedral towers

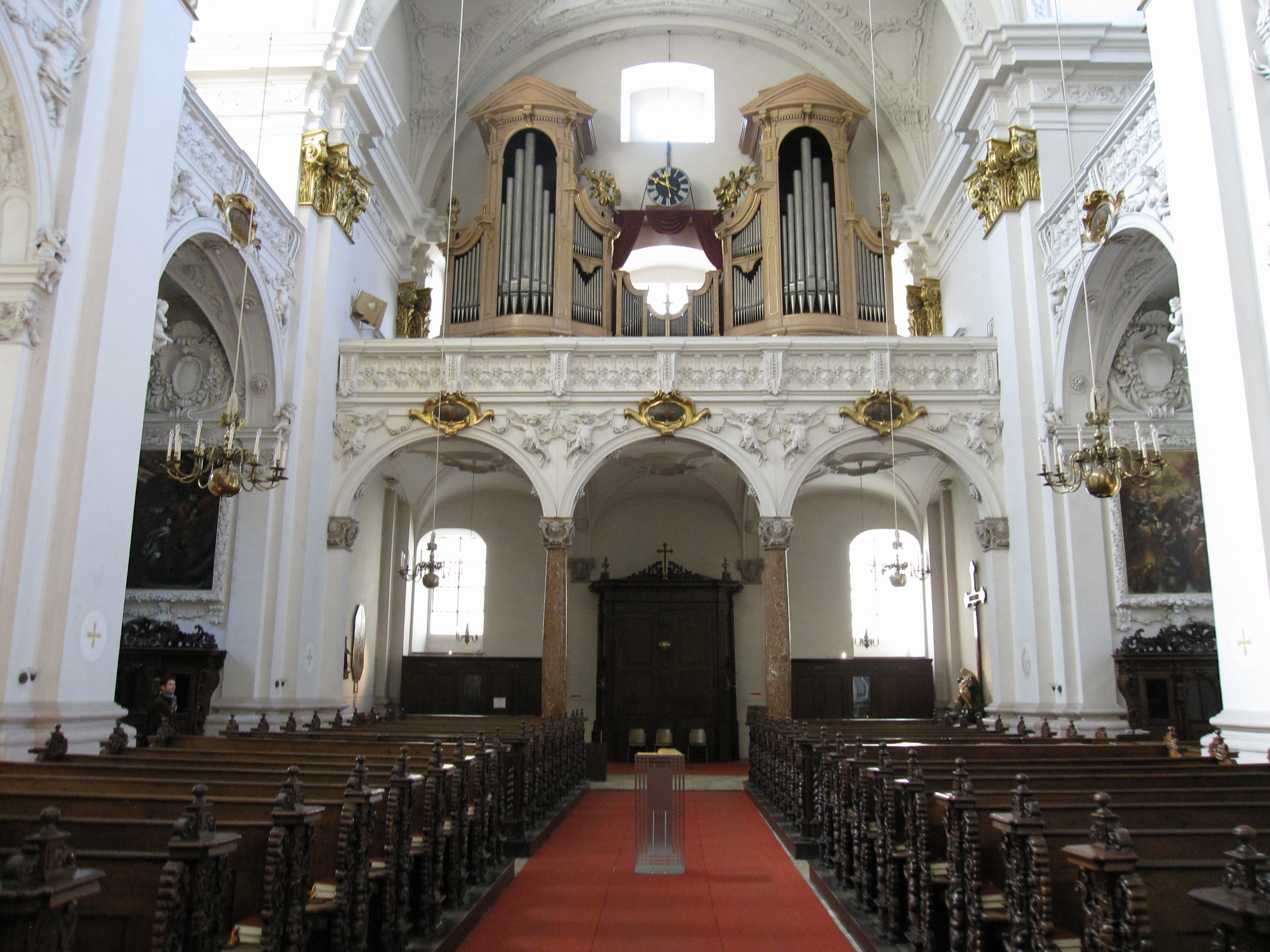
Organ loft

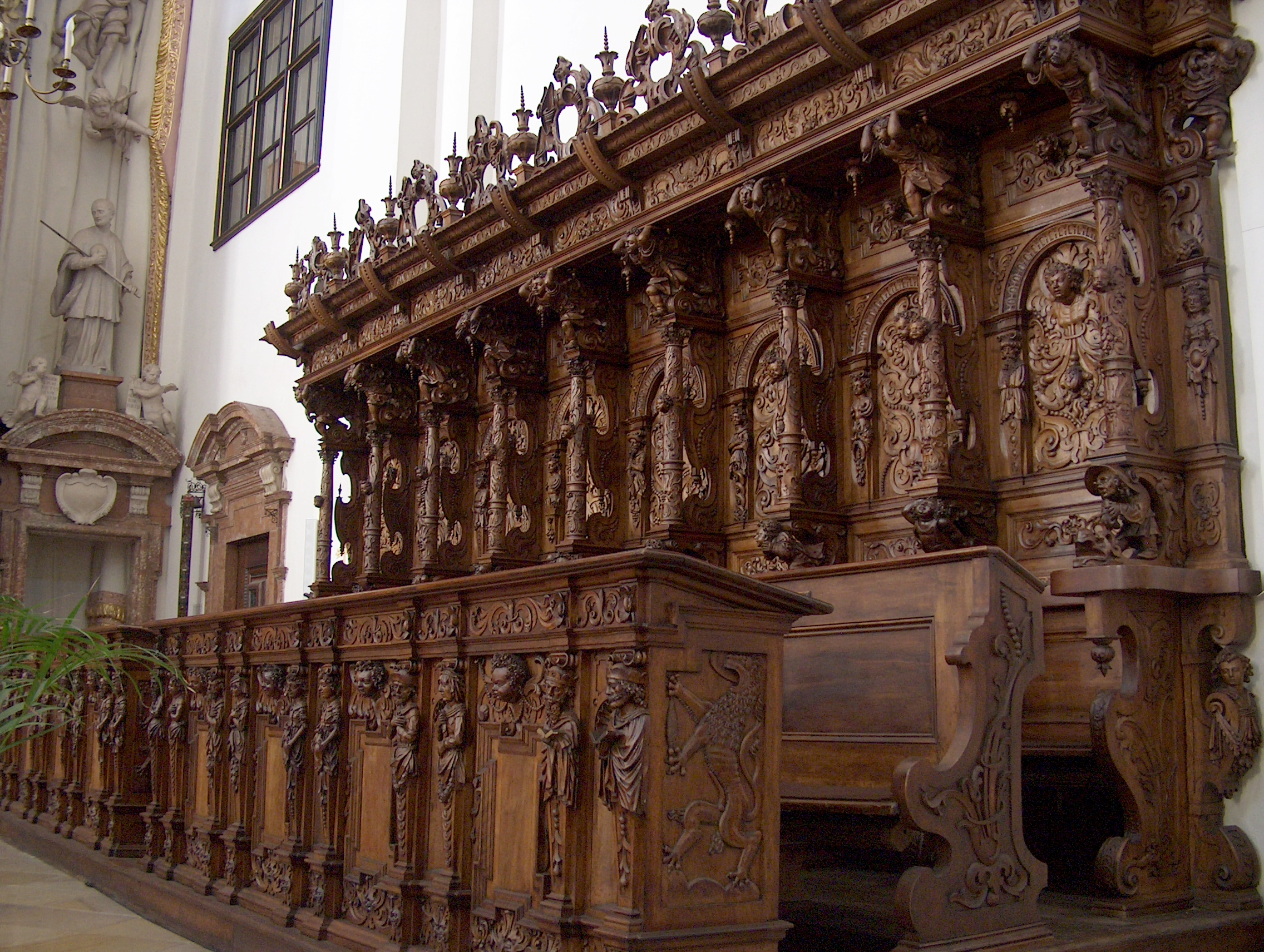
Choir stalls by Michael Obermüller (1633), transferred from Garsten Abbey in 1856

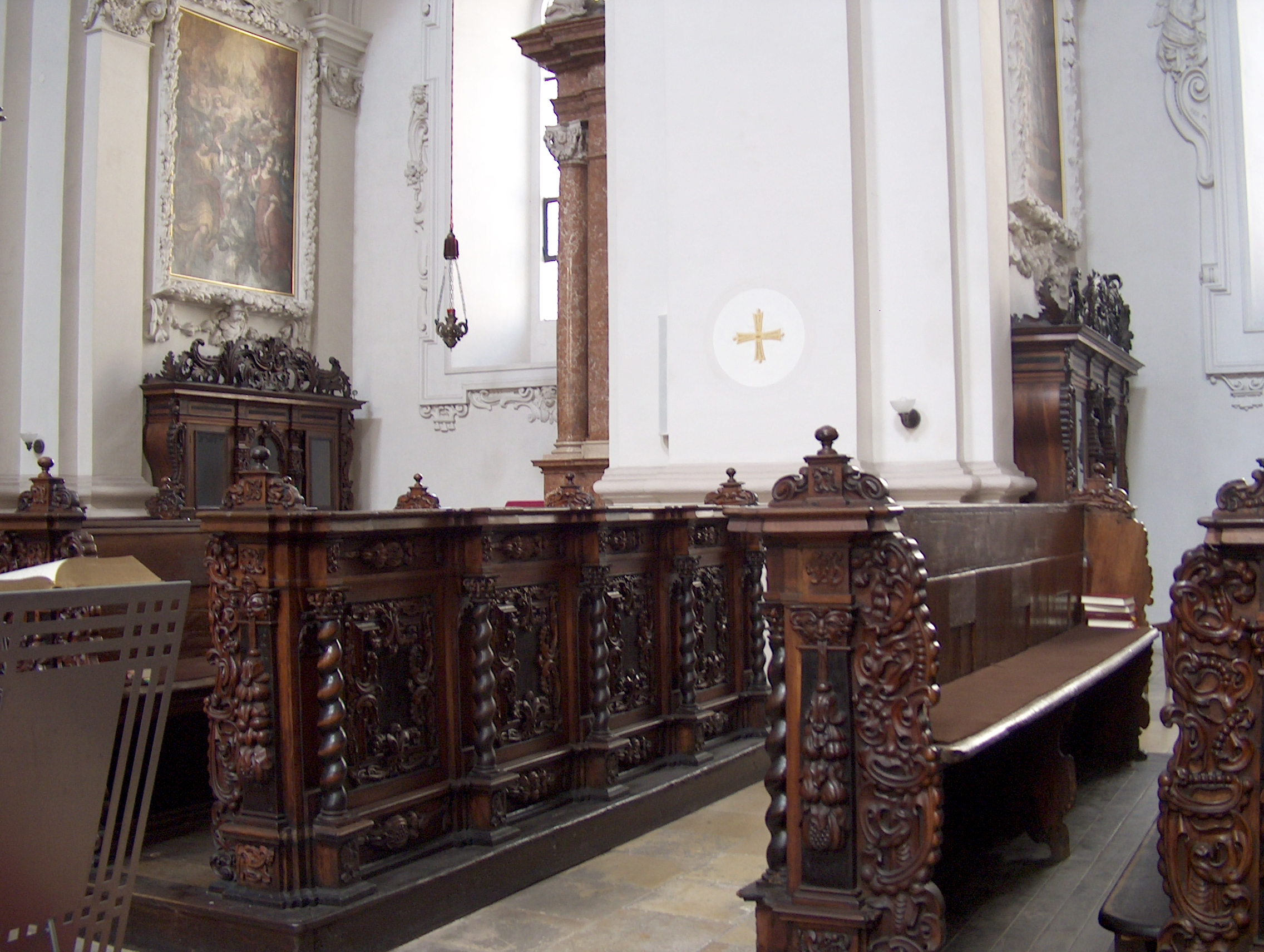
Benches for common people

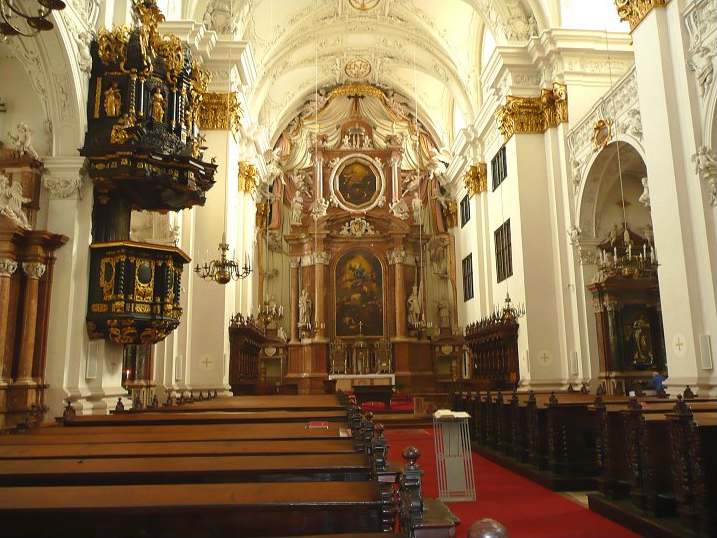
Altar

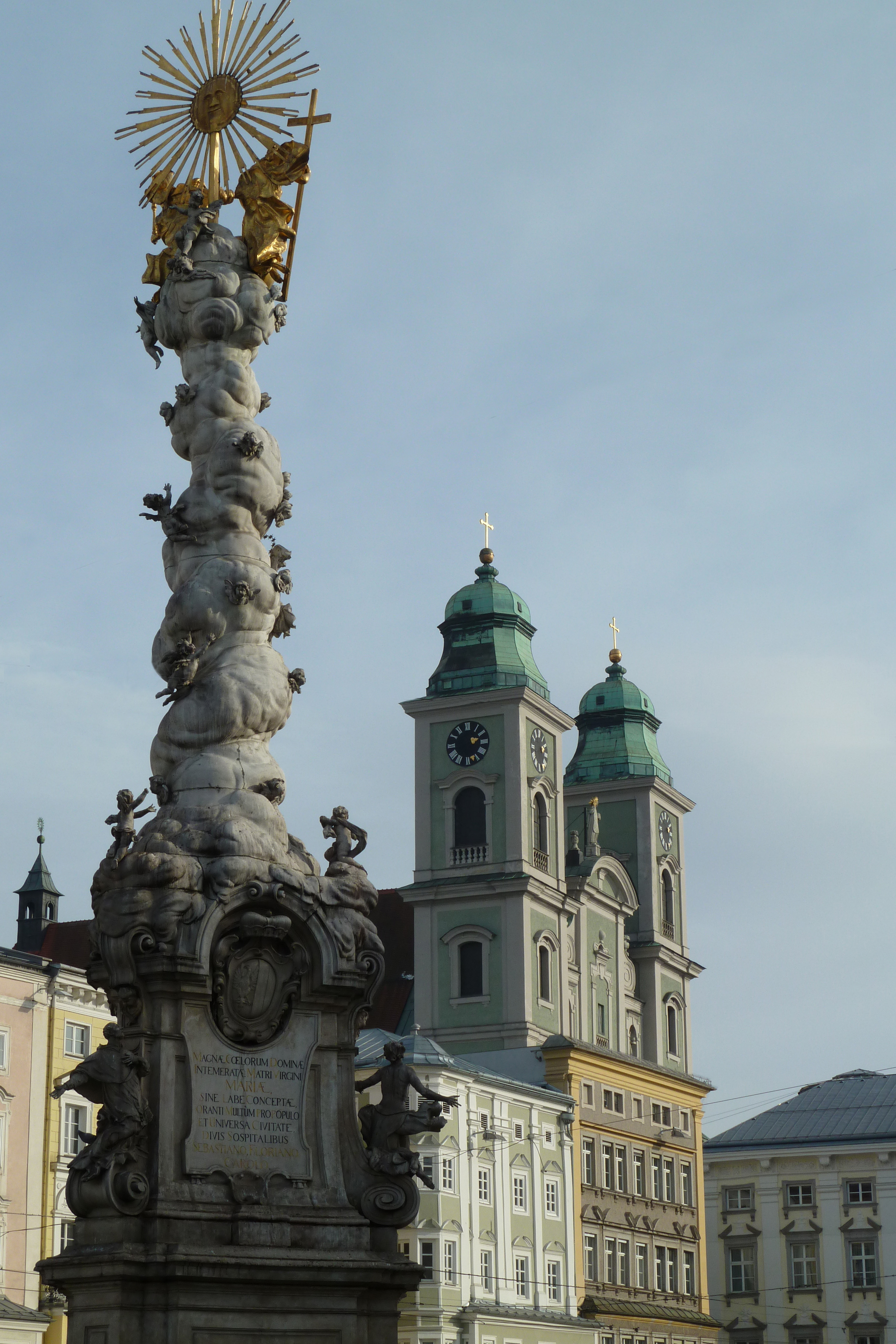
Trinity Column with the west front of the old cathedral behind

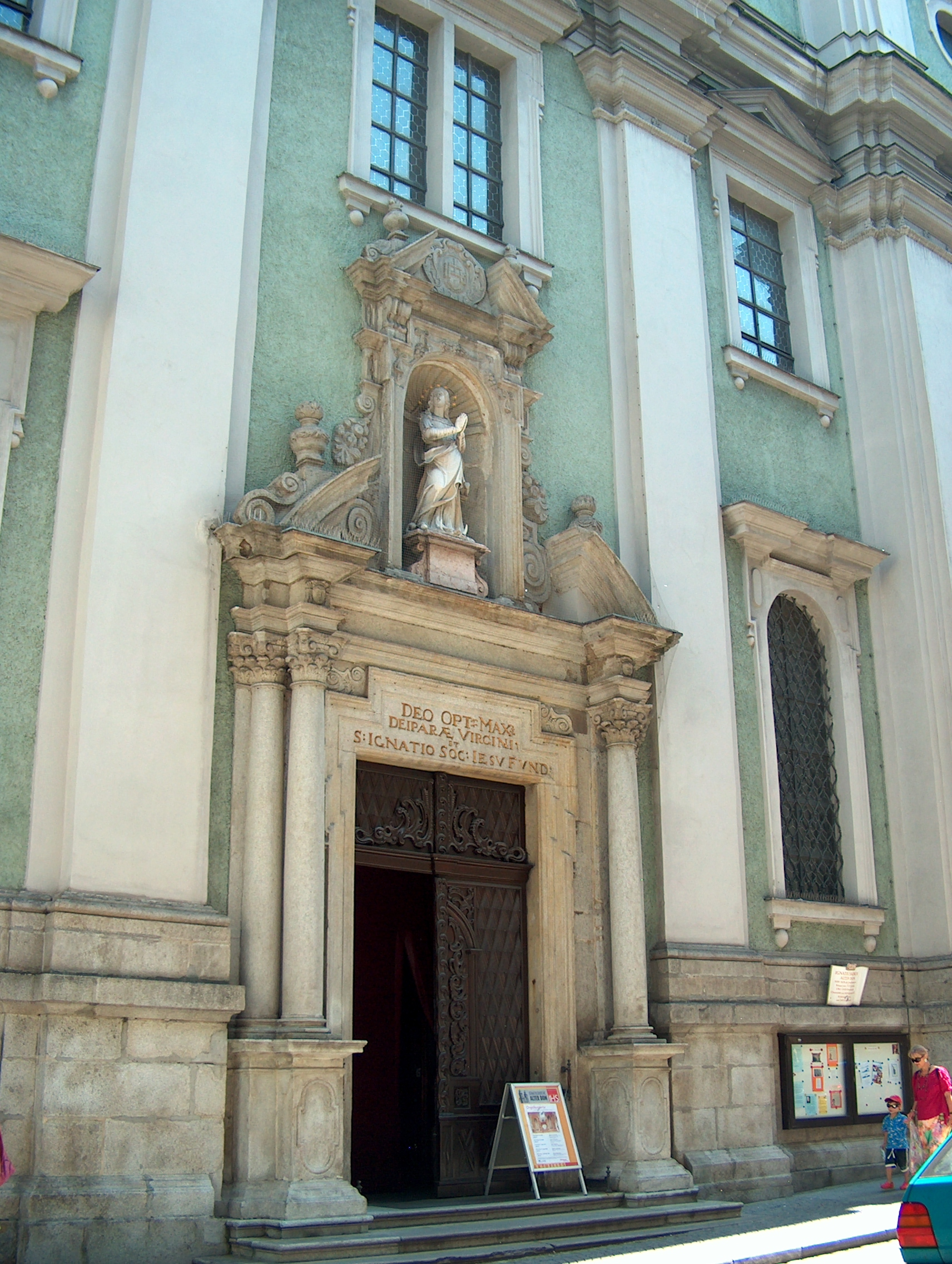
Entrance

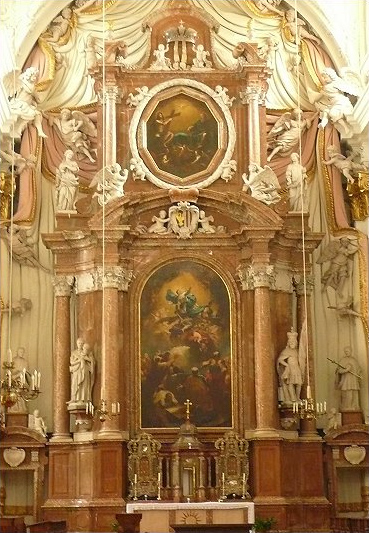
High altar by Giovanni Battista Barbarino and Giovanni Battista Colombo

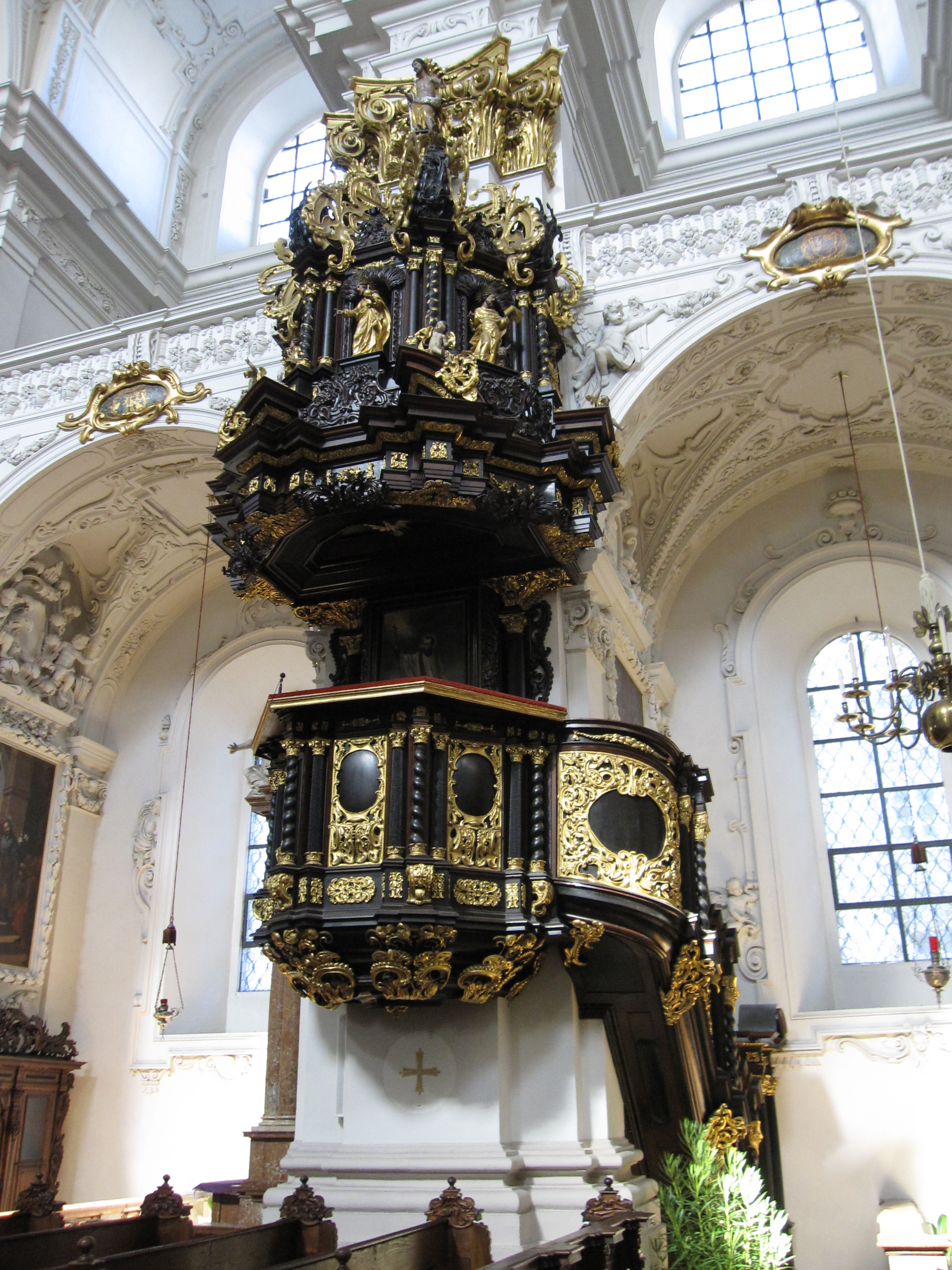
Pulpit

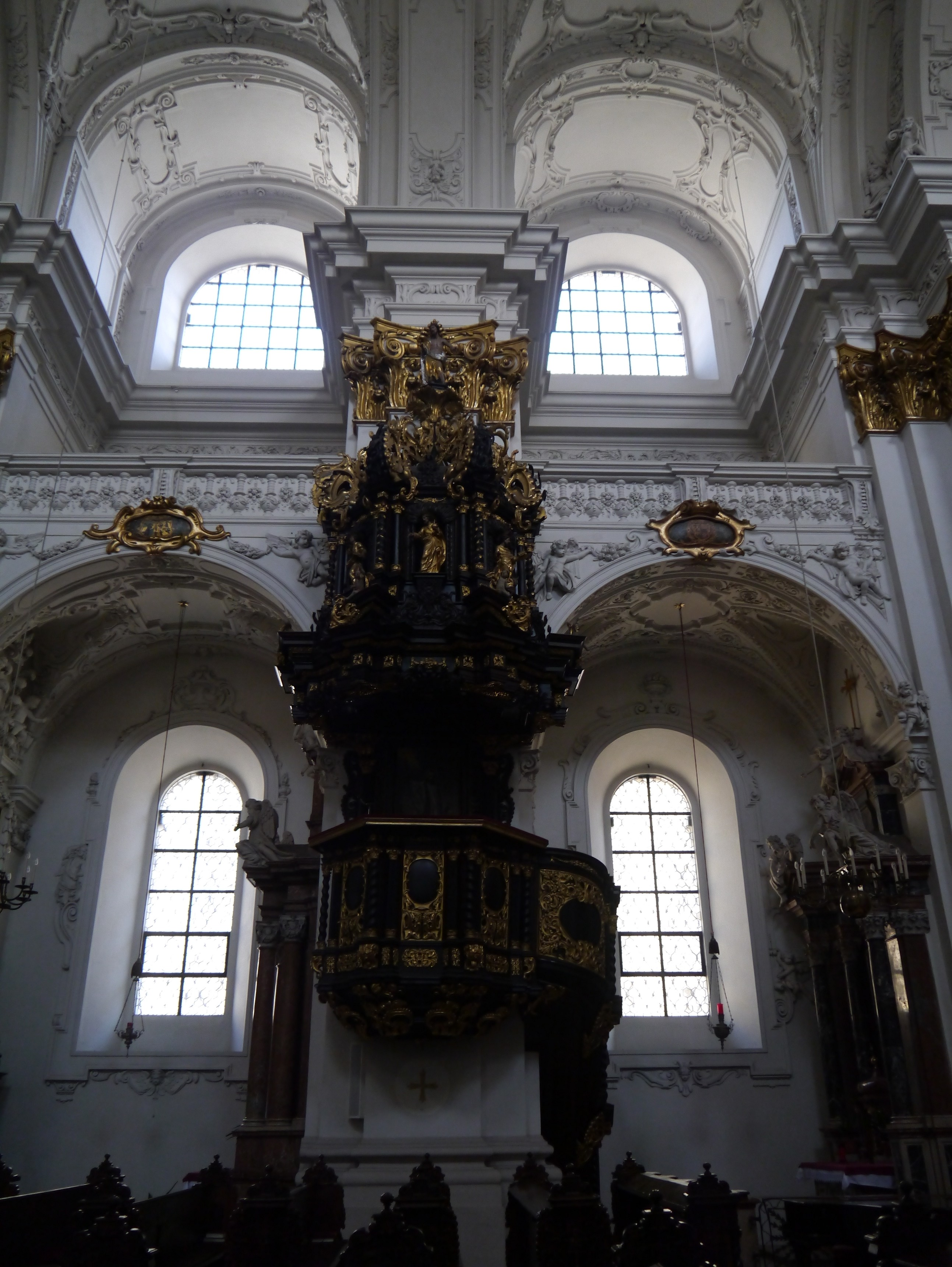
Pulpit

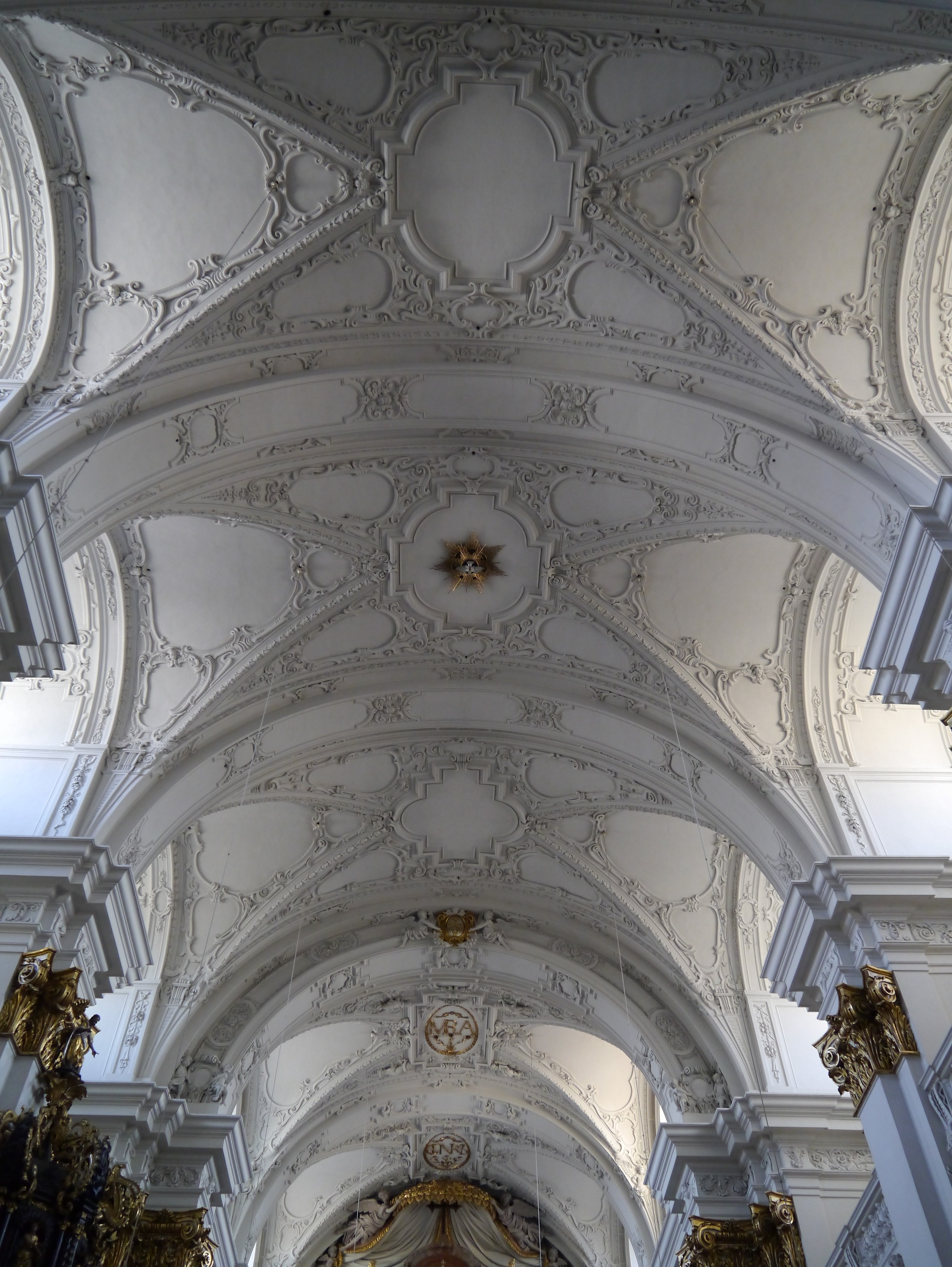
Ceiling

== See also ==
- List of Jesuit sites
