= Ernest Johann Nepomuk =

- Bishop of Linz
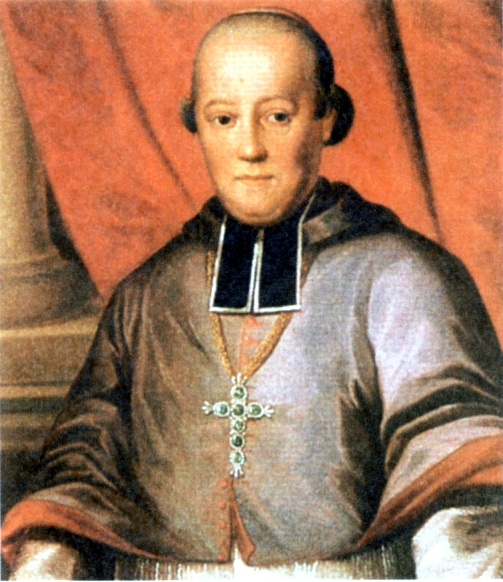
- 18th century portrait of the bishop
- Diocese: Roman Catholic Diocese of Linz
- Installed: 1785
- Term ended: 1788
- Successor: Joseph Anton Gall

Orders
- Ordination: 7 March 1754
- Consecration: 8 March 1767 by Klemens Wenzeslaus von Sachsen

Personal details
- Born: 20 April 1731 Vienna
- Died: 17 March 1788 (aged 56) Linz
- Denomination: Roman Catholic

Ernest Johann Nepomuk (20 April 1731 – 17 March 1788), Imperial Count von Herberstein, was the first bishop of the diocese of Linz from 1785 to 1788.

== Life ==
Ernest Johann Nepomuk was born on 20 April 1731 in Vienna, Austria. He was ordained a priest of Freising, Germany on 7 March 1754. On 16 February he was appointed Auxiliary Bishop of Freising and Titular Bishop of Eucarpia. He was consecrated on 8 March 1767. Nepomuk was chosen as Bishop of Linz, Austria on 1 January 1785, and confirmed in this position of 14 February 1785. He was installed on 1 May 1785. He died in office on 17 March 1788.

== Imperial nomination ==
Formerly titular Bishop of Eucarpia, he had been the Official of the Prince-Bishop of Passau and Vicar-General of Lower Austria. The appointment was confirmed by the pope on 14 February 1785, and the bishop was enthroned on 1 May 1785. By order of the emperor the cathedral chapter was to consist of a vicar-general, a provost, a dean, a custos, and thirteen simple ecclesiastics; the members were appointed by the emperor, before the approval of the pope was received.

== Erection of the diocese ==
The Bull of Erection assigned the ancient parish church of Linz as the cathedral, but the former church of the Jesuits was, without notification to the Papal See of the substitution, at once chosen in its place; it was not until 1841 that the Old Cathedral, Linz, was sanctioned by a Bull.

== Endowment of the diocese ==
In 1789, the endowment of the diocese was fixed at 12,000 gulden ($4,800), to which were added the revenues from the property of several suppressed monasteries. The territorial limits of the diocese corresponded to those of the crownland of Upper Austria with the addition of several parishes of Salzburg, to the separation of which the Archbishop of Salzburg gave his consent in 1786. At the time of its foundation, the diocese included 26 deaneries with 404 parishes.

== Government intervention ==
The new diocese, like the whole of Austria at that time, suffered much from ordinances of government officials. They intervened in almost all domains of Church life and often subjected bishop, clergy, and laity to regulations. In all these innovations the Bishop of Linz and his chapter aided and supported the government. Not only in secular matters did the bishop ask for the assistance of the provincial government at Linz, he also sought to obtain the approbation of the civil authorities for the statutes of his chapter, as well as for the episcopal and consistorial seals.
