= Erich Widder =

Austrian art historian (1925–2000)

Erich Widder (24 October 1925, in Wels – 30 May 2000, in Linz) was an Austrian art historian and theologian, who primarily worked as the chief conservator for the Roman Catholic Diocese of Linz. A graduate of the University of Fribourg and the University of Innsbruck, he also served the Second Vatican Council on the liturgical reorganisation of church spaces. He was awarded an Austrian Decoration for Science and Art.
