= Interconfessional laws =

19th-century Austrian laws

The Interconfessional laws were a series of 19th-century laws in Austria that were meant to install a government based on separation of church and state and passed on 25 May 1868.

== Opposition ==
Bishop Rudigier of Linz became known for his memorable struggle against the laws, which were hostile to the Church and against to the marriage and school laws. The opposition to the laws led to judicial proceedings against the bishop and to a fine, which was, however, at once remitted by the Emperor.

== Confiscated land ==
The defence of the rights of the Church with regard to the Christian schools had another negative result. In 1869, the Liberal parliamentary majority confiscated the lands forming the endowment of the Diocese of Linz and withheld them until its downfall in 1883.
