= Joseph Gall =

Joseph Gall may refer to:

- Joseph G. Gall (born 1928), American cell biologist
- Joseph Anton Gall (1748–1807), bishop of Linz
