= Hittmair =

Hittmair may refer to:

- Otto Hittmair (1924–2003), an Austrian theoretical physicist
- Rudolph Hittmair (1859–1915), Austrian clergyman and bishop
- 10782 Hittmair, a minor planet named after physicist Otto Hittmair
