= Diocese of Linz =

Catholic ecclesiastical territory

Coordinates: 48.3003°N 14.2860°E

Diocese of Linz Dioecesis Linciensis Diözese Linz

Catholic
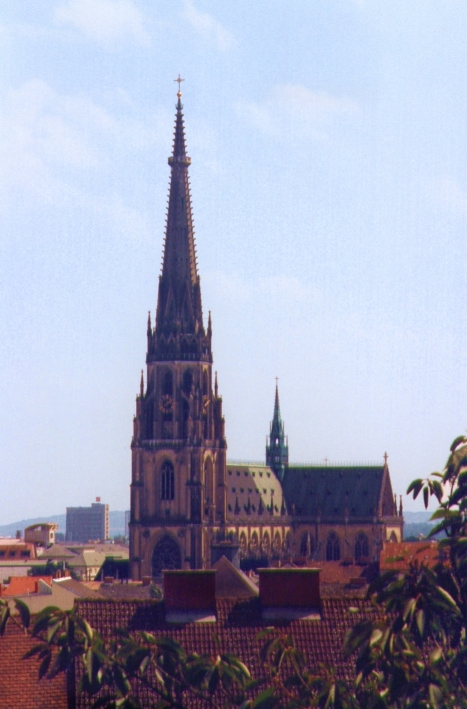
- New Cathedral, Linz

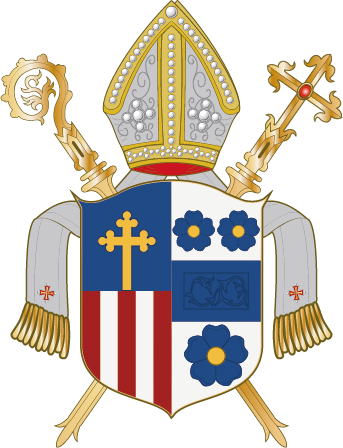
- Coat of arms

Location
- Country: Austria
- Territory: Upper Austria
- Ecclesiastical province: Vienna
- Metropolitan: Archdiocese of Vienna

Statistics
- Area: 11,909 km^{2} (4,598 sq mi)
- Population: Total; Catholics: (as of 2019); 1,480,000; 963,820 (65.1%)

Information
- Denomination: Roman Catholic
- Rite: Roman Rite
- Established: January 28, 1785
- Cathedral: Cathedral of the Immaculate Conception
- Patron saint: Saint Florian; Severinus of Noricum

Current leadership
- Pope: Leo XIV
- Bishop: Manfred Scheuer
- Metropolitan Archbishop: Josef Grünwidl
- Bishops emeritus: Maximilian Aichern

Map
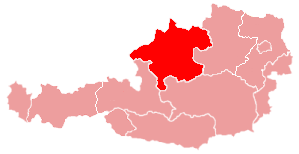

Website
- Website of the Diocese

The Diocese of Linz (Latin: Dioecesis Linciensis) is a Latin Church diocese of the Catholic Church. It is a suffragan of the Archdiocese of Vienna, Austria.

== History ==
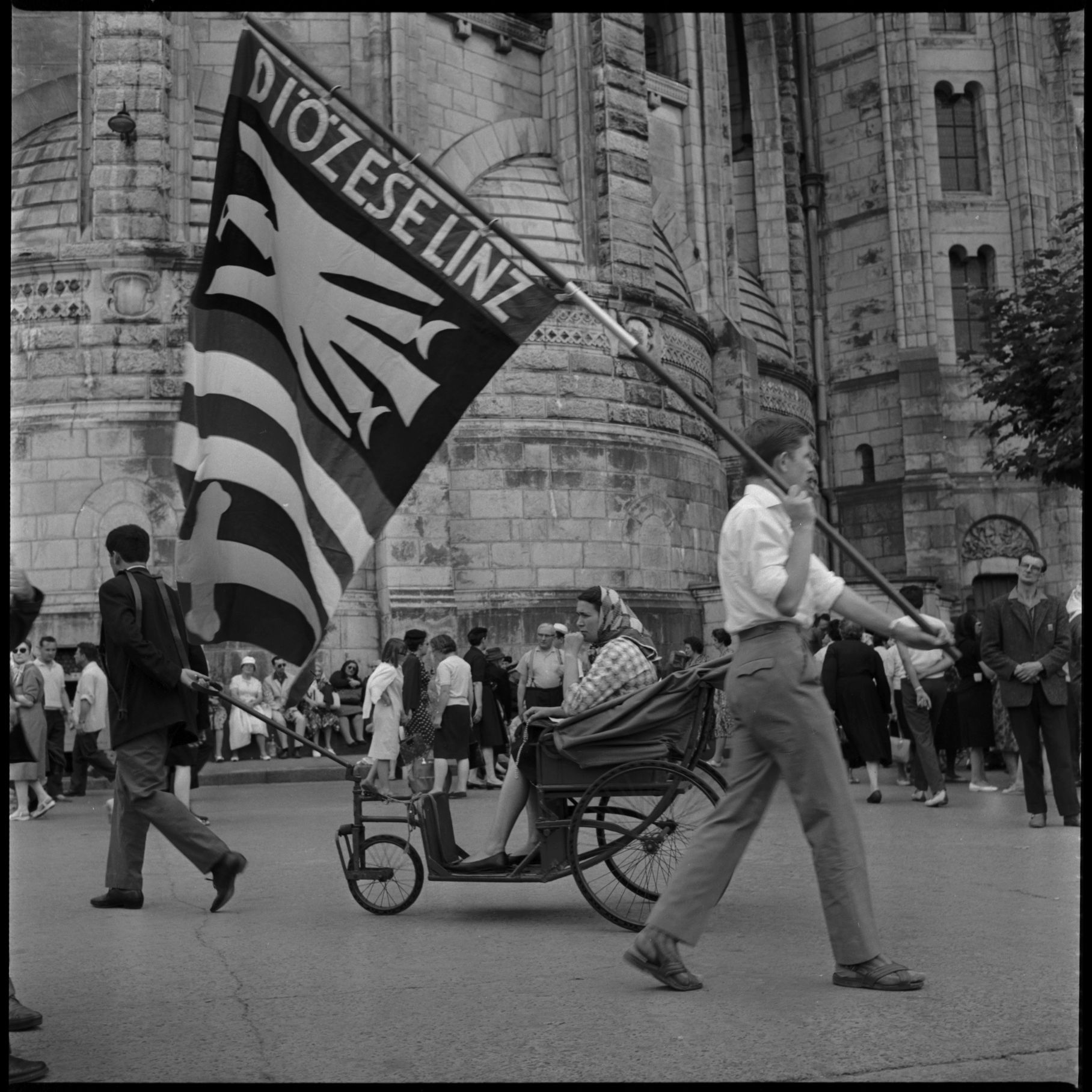
Flag of Diocese of Linz in Lourdes in 1964.

=== Early history ===
In the early Middle Ages the greater part of the territory of the present Diocese of Linz was subject to the bishops of Lauriacum (Lorch); at a later date it formed part of the great Diocese of Passau, which extended from the Isar to the Leitha. The Prince-Bishop of Passau personally administered the upper part or Upper Austria, while an auxiliary bishop, having his residence in Vienna and called the Official, administered for him the eastern part or Lower Austria.

To do away with the political influence in his territories of the bishops of Passau, who were also princes of the Empire, emperor Joseph II decided to found two new dioceses. These were in Linz and St. Pölten, which in a certain measure were to renew the old Lauriacum. The emperor only awaited the death of Cardinal Firmian, then Bishop of Passau, to carry out his plans.

The cardinal's eyes were scarcely closed (d. 13 March 1783), before the emperor on 16 March seized all the landed property of the Diocese of Passau in his territories.

By an agreement of 4 July 1784, the confiscation of all the properties and rights belonging to the Diocese of Passau in Austria was annulled, and the tithes and revenues were restored to it.

The first bishop (1785-8), Ernest Johann Nepomuk, Imperial Count von Herberstein and formerly titular Bishop of Eucarpia, had been the Official of the Prince-Bishop of Passau and Vicar-General of Lower Austria.

The next bishop, Joseph Anton Gall (1788–1807), was a political ally of Joseph II and of josephinism. The third Bishop of Linz, Sigismund Ernst Hohenwart had been a cathedral canon of Gurk and Vicar-General of Klagenfurt. His successor was the Benedictine Gregorius Thomas Ziegler (1827–52), formerly Bishop of Tarnov.

=== Revolution of 1848 ===
The Revolution of 1848 not only increased political liberty, but also gave to the Church greater independence in its own province.

The session of the Third German Catholic Congress, held at Linz in 1850, also strengthened the Church in the diocese. A great development of religious life in the diocese resulted from the restored liberties of the Church. Much of the credit for this growth is due to the vigorous and unwearied labours of the fifth bishop, Franz-Josef Rudigier (1853–84), who opposed the Interconfessional laws of 1868.

His successor, Ernst Maria Müller, had only a short episcopate (1885-8). In the next bishop, Franz Maria Doppelbauer (1889–1908), the diocese received a truly apostolic head, whose influence extended far beyond his own sphere of work. The present bishop is Manfred Scheuer.

== Churches ==
The Gothic cathedral of the Immaculate Conception, built from the plans of the Cologne architect, Vincenz Statz, was begun in 1862 and consecrated in 1905; the tower, 443 feet (135 m) high, was finished in 1902. The Old Cathedral, originally the church of the Jesuits, was built in the Baroque style between 1669 and 1682. There are several old collegiate churches (St. Florian, Kremsmünster, Mondsee, Lambach, Garsten, Reichersberg, Wilhering, etc.), originally built in the Romanesque period and nearly all rebuilt in the seventeenth and eighteenth centuries in the Baroque style.

The most important churches in the Baroque style of architecture are the collegiate churches of St. Florian (1636–1745), and of Baumgartenberg (rebuilt 1684–1718). The most important buildings of the Gothic period are the parish church at Steyr (begun in 1443), with a tower 263 feet (80 m) high, and the church of the hospital at Braunau on the Inn (1439–92), with a tower 300 feet high. A work of sculpture celebrated in the history of art is the high altar at St. Wolfgang carved by Michael Pacher in 1481.

== Bishops ==
=== Ordinaries ===
- Ernest Johann Nepomuk (1783–1788)
- Joseph Anton Gall (1789–1807)
- Sigismund Ernst Hohenwart (1809–1825)
- Gregorius Thomas Ziegler (1827–1852)
- Franz-Josef Rudigier (1853–1884)
- Ernest Maria Müller (1885–1888)
- Franz Maria Doppelbauer (1889–1908)
- Rudolph Hittmair (1909–1915)
- Johannes Maria Gföllner (1915–1941)
- Josephus Calasanz Fließer (1946–1955)
- Franz Salesius Zauner (1956–1980)
- Maximilian Aichern (1981–2005)
- Ludwig Schwarz (2005–2015)
- Manfred Scheuer (2015– )

=== Coadjutor bishop ===
- Franz Sales Zauner (1949-1956)

=== Auxiliary bishops ===
- Joseph Calasanz Fließer (Fliesser) (1941-1946), appointed Bishop here
- Alois Wagner (1969-1981), appointed Vice President of the Pontifical Council “Cor Unum”
- Gerhard Maria Wagner (2009); did not take effect

=== Other priests of this diocese who became bishops ===
- Michael Johann Wagner, appointed Bishop of Austria, Military in 1833
- Kurt Krenn, appointed Auxiliary Bishop of Wien {Vienna} in 1987
