= Franz-Josef Rudigier =

Austrian Roman Catholic prelate

Venerable Franz Joseph Rudigier
- Bishop of Linz
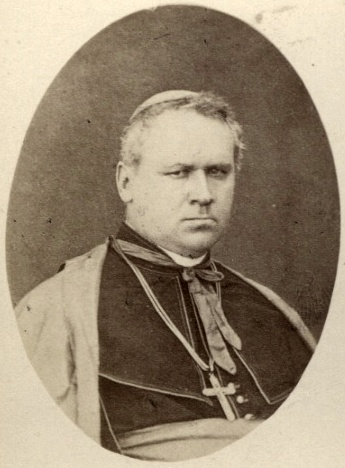
- Franz Joseph Rudigier in 1870
- Church: Roman Catholic Church
- Diocese: Linz
- See: Linz
- Appointed: 10 March 1853
- Installed: 12 June 1853
- Term ended: 29 November 1884
- Predecessor: Gregorius Thomas Ziegler
- Successor: Ernest Maria Müller

Orders
- Ordination: 12 April 1835
- Consecration: 5 June 1853 by Michele Viale-Prelà
- Rank: Bishop

Personal details
- Born: Franz Joseph Rudigier; 7 April 1811 Partenen, Vorarlberg, Austrian Empire
- Died: 29 November 1884 (aged 73) Linz, Oberösterreich, Austria-Hungary
- Buried: New Cathedral, Linz, Austria
- Motto: Quis ut Deus ("Who is like God?")
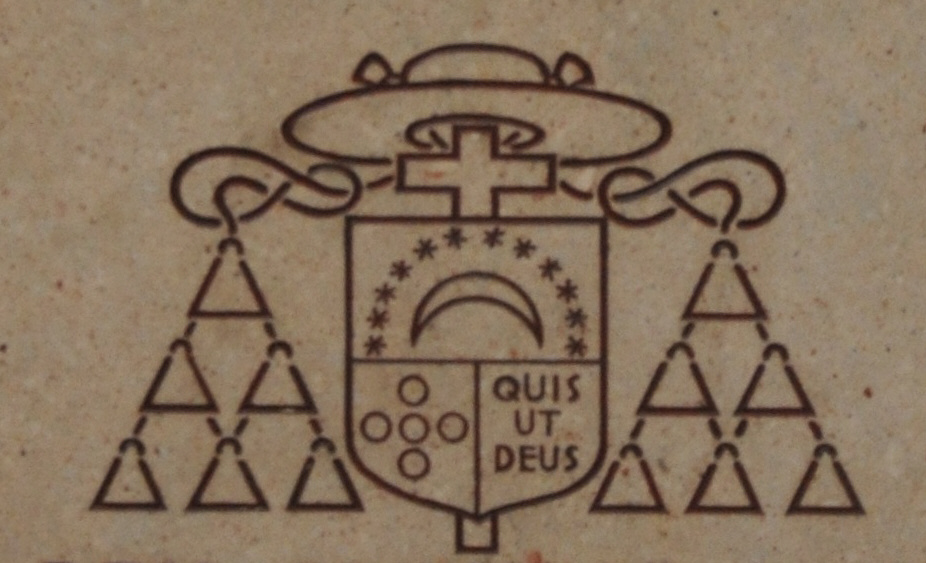
- Coat of arms

Franz Josef Rudigier (7 April 1811 – 29 November 1884) was an Austrian Roman Catholic prelate and served as the Bishop of Linz from his appointment in 1853 until his death. Much of his local diocese grew due to his vigorous in promoting evangelic zeal and fundamental religious principles. He became the intellectual figurehead for Catholics in their struggle with liberalism. He promoted the Christian press and took a visible stand defending the 1855 concordat, when liberals annulled it without papal consultation in 1870. A beatification process for Rudigier was initiated under Pope Pius X in 1905 and he was titled as a Servant of God. The confirmation of his life of heroic virtue allowed for Pope Benedict XVI to name him as Venerable in 2009.

== Life ==
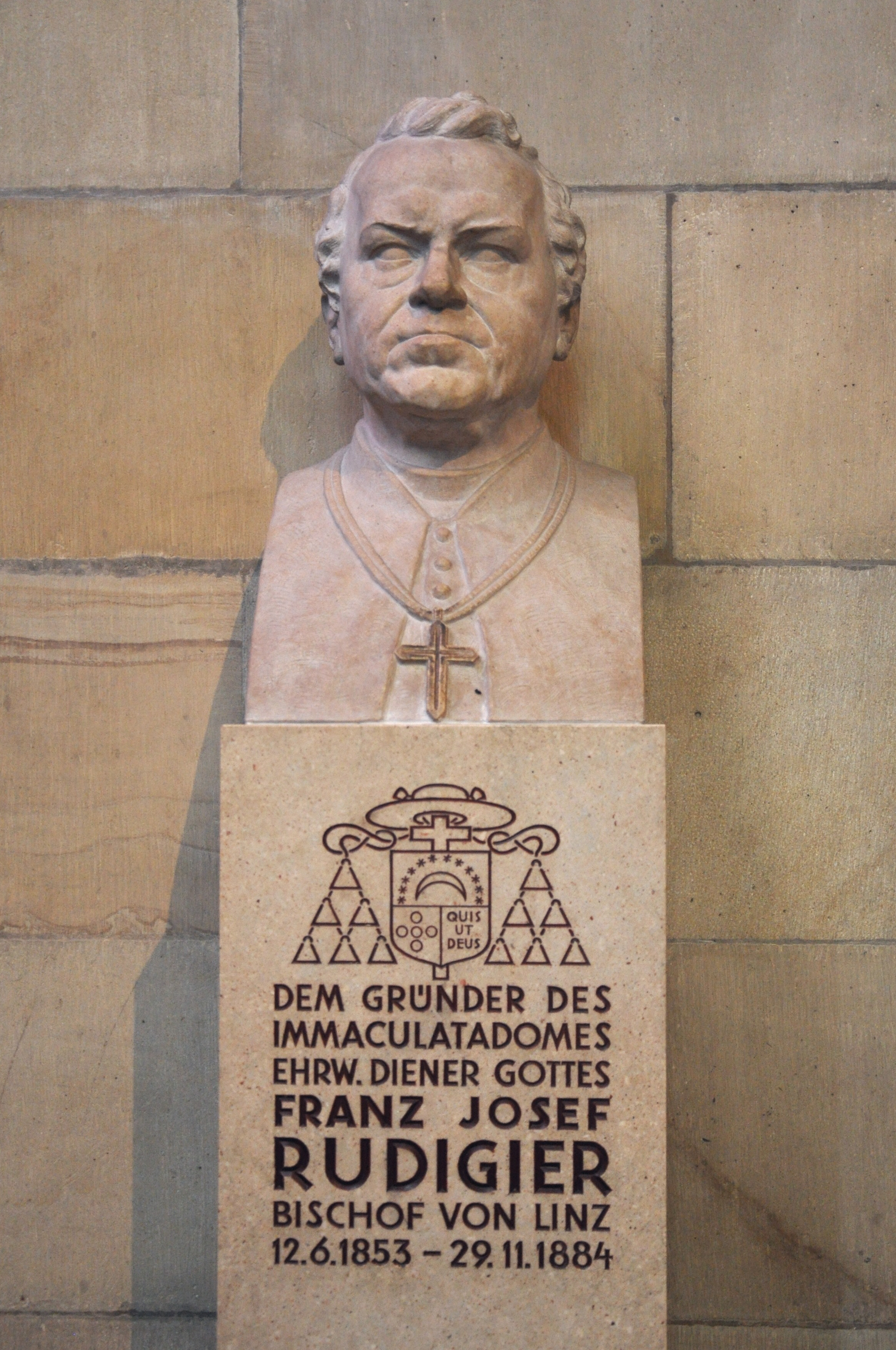
Bust.

Franz Joseph Rudigier was born in the Austrian Empire on 7 April 1811 as the last of eight children to Johann Christian Rudigier and Maria Josepha Tschofen.

In 1823 Rudigier was sent to learn Latin under his brother Joseph, who had just been ordained as a priest, and then attended college at Innsbruck before deciding to start his studies to become a priest. In 1831 he commenced his studies to become a priest in Brixen and was elevated to the diaconate on 5 April 1835. Rudigier was ordained to the priesthood in Bressanone on 12 April 1835. The new priest was assigned as a pastor at Vandans and then from 1836 to Bürs until 1838 when he moved to the capital of Vienna for further studies at the Frintaneum; in 1839 he was made a professor of church history and canon law at Brixen when he returned there. Rudigier also served as a teacher of Emperor Franz Joseph I and his brother Maximilian I. In 1848, he was made the provost of San Candido and in 1850 the canon of Brixen.

Franz Joseph I recommended Rudigier to become the Bishop of Linz and submitted this recommendation to Pope Pius IX in 1852; the pope confirmed the appointment on 10 March 1853; he was enthroned and received episcopal consecration on 5 June 1853 from the Cardinal Archbishop of Bologna Michele Viale-Prelà.

The papal proclamation of the dogma of the Immaculate Conception in 1854 prompted Rudigier to initiate the construction of a new cathedral in 1855 in honor of this occasion; construction was completed in 1924, long after the bishop's death. He issued a pastoral letter on 7 September 1868 that called the faithful to oppose new marriage laws and he was arrested on 5 July 1869 and then sentenced for two weeks, effective the sentencing hearing on 12 July; he was released on 26 July and received an imperial pardon on 27 July. He liked the notion of prison being a chance to suffer in the name of Jesus Christ.

Rudigier died on 29 November 1884; while ill, he was said to have often recited the last verses of the Stabat Mater: "Christe, cum sit hinc exire, da per matrem me venire ad palmam victoriae. Quando corpus morietur, fac, ut animæ donetur. Paradisi gloria". His remains were interred at the Old Cathedral but in 1924 moved to the new cathedral.

== Beatification process ==
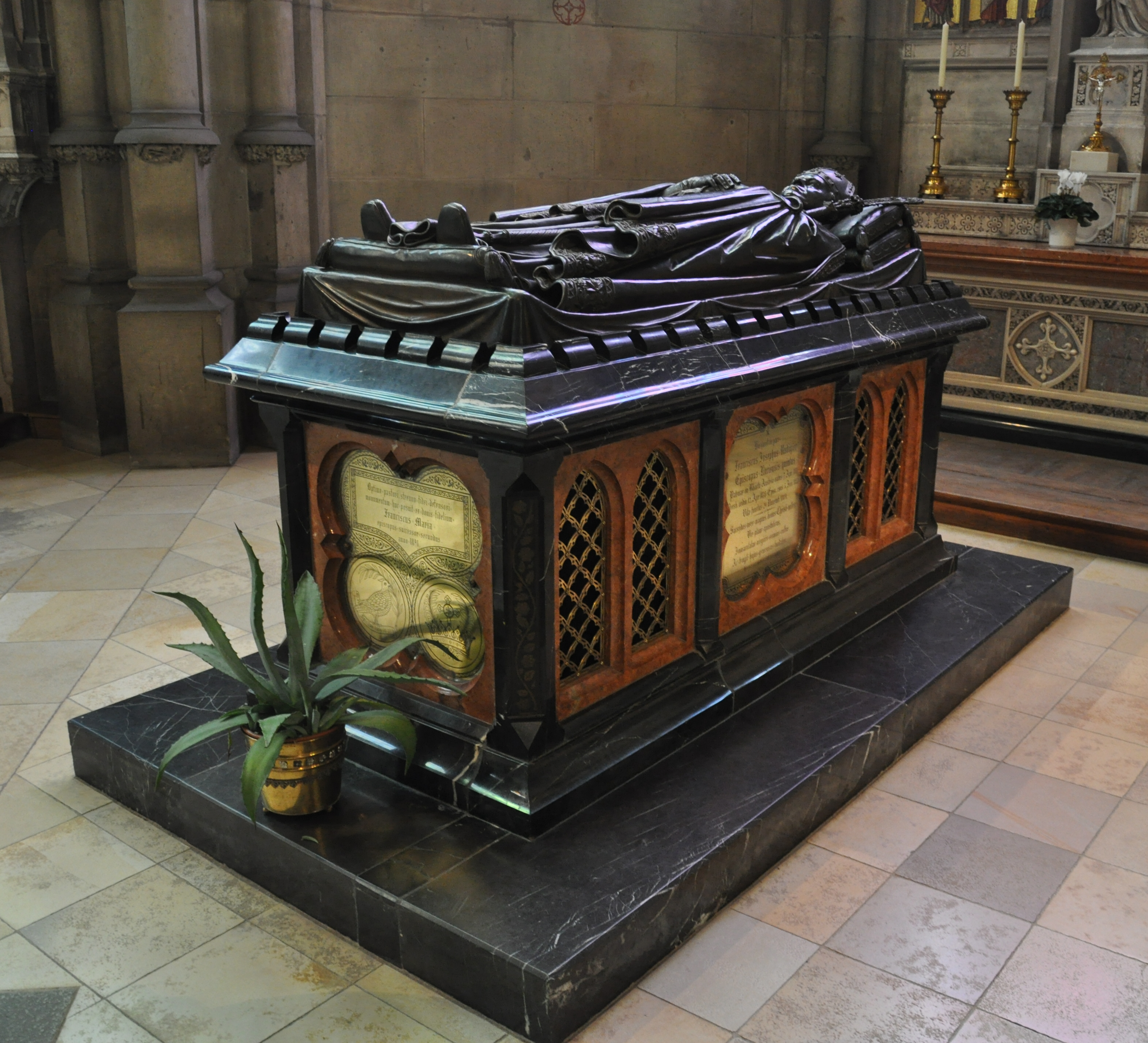
Tomb.

The beatification process for Rudigier commenced in the Linz diocese in an informative process that Bishop Franz Maria Doppelbauer inaugurated on 28 February 1895 and concluded on 15 December 1900. Twin rogatory processes were held both in the Diocese of Rome and the Diocese of Brescia from 13 May 1897 until 2 June 1898. All of Rudigier's spiritual writings received the approval of theologians as being in line with Christian doctrine on 1 May 1902. The formal introduction to the cause came under Pope Pius X on 6 December 1905, and Rudigier became titled as a Servant of God.

An apostolic process was held in Linz that Doppelbauer opened on 8 November 1906 while the same bishop later closed it on 3 July 1903. The Congregation for Rites validated this process in Rome on 8 July 1914. A second apostolic process opened in Linz on 15 December 1926 under Bishop Johannes Maria Gföllner and closed later in 1931; this also received C.O.R. validation on 14 January 1853 and an antepreparatory committee later approved the cause and its continuation on 24 November 1964. The Congregation for the Causes of Saints later validated all previous processes on 7 June 2002 and received the official Positio dossier from the postulation in 2002.

Theologians voiced their assent to the cause on 30 May 2008 and the cardinal and bishop members of the C.C.S. also voiced their approval for the cause on 20 January 2009. The confirmation of Rudigier's model Christian life of heroic virtue allowed for Pope Benedict XVI to name Rudigier as Venerable on 3 April 2009.

The miracle required for Rudigier's beatification was investigated and then received validation from the C.C.S. on 7 June 2002. The medical board approved this miracle a decade later on 16 December 2010.

The current postulator for this cause is Dr. Andrea Ambrosi.
