= Franz Zauner (bishop) =

Austrian priest and theologian

Franz Salesius Zauner
- Bishop of Linz
- Church: Catholic Church
- Diocese: Diocese of Linz
- In office: 1 January 1956 – 15 August 1980
- Predecessor: Josephus Calasanz Fließer
- Successor: Maximilian Aichern
- Previous posts: Titular Bishop of Fata (1949-1956); Coadjutor Bishop of Linz (1949-1956)

Orders
- Ordination: 25 October 1931
- Consecration: 15 August 1949 by Theodor Innitzer

Personal details
- Born: 11 December 1904 Grieskirchen, Archduchy of Austria above the Enns, Cisleithania, Austria-Hungary
- Died: 20 February 1994 (aged 89) Linz, Upper Austria, Austria

Franz Zauner (born 11 December 1904 in Grieskirchen; died 20 February 1994 in Linz) was an Austrian clergyman and bishop for the Roman Catholic Diocese of Linz. He was ordained in 1931. He was appointed bishop in 1961. He retired in 1980, and died in 1994.
