= Gerhard Maria Wagner =

Austrian Roman Catholic priest

The Reverend Gerhard Maria Wagner
- Parish Priest of Windischgarsten
- Church: Catholic Church
- Archdiocese: Archdiocese of Vienna
- Diocese: Diocese of Linz
- In office: 1988 to present
- Other post: Auxiliary Bishop-elect of Linz (31 January 2009 – 2 March 2009)

Orders
- Ordination: 10 October 1978 by László Lékai

Personal details
- Born: 17 July 1954 (age 72) Wartberg ob der Aist, Upper Austria, Austria
- Denomination: Catholicism

Gerhard Maria Wagner (born 17 July 1954, Wartberg ob der Aist, Austria) is an Austrian Catholic priest who was appointed Auxiliary Bishop of Linz on 31 January 2009. Amidst controversy over his views that sin had caused Hurricane Katrina, Wagner turned down the post on 15 February 2009.

== Ordained ministry ==
On 10 October 1978, Wagner was ordained to the priesthood of the Roman Catholic Church by Cardinal László Lékai, Archbishop of Esztergom. Since 1988, he has been parish priest of Windischgarsten, Upper Austria in the Diocese of Linz.

=== Episcopal appointment ===
On 31 January 2009, Wagner was appointed auxiliary bishop of Linz, Austria, by Pope Benedict XVI. Amidst controversy over his views, Wagner resigned on 15 February 2009.

Wagner's appointment as auxiliary bishop was met with controversy among Austrian Roman Catholics, with Linz Diocese Bishop Ludwig Schwarz supportive, an informal group of priests led by Upper Austria church dean Franz Wild opposed, and Graz-Seckau Diocese Bishop Egon Kapellari optimistic that the "crisis" would be overcome by "good will" from both supporters and opponents.

Two weeks after his appointment Wagner requested its revocation because of the widespread criticism. In those 2 weeks the number of people leaving the Church had quadrupled in his Linz congregation, with similar or even higher numbers in the neighbouring communities, many of the ex-parishioners naming Wagner's appointment as the reason for their departure. The Times-Picayune reported Wagner's announcement in an Associated Press article concluding with a comparison between the Wagner situation and that surrounding the Holy See's decision to lift the excommunication of the bishops of the Society of St. Pius X, particularly Holocaust-denier Richard Williamson. The Vatican formally accepted the resignation and dispensed Wagner from his appointment on 2 March 2009.

== Views ==
Wagner alleged that the Harry Potter novels partake of satanism.

Wagner became widely known in the world press for his 2005 comment attributing Hurricane Katrina to God's ire toward the sins of New Orleans.

Wagner connected Yoga to demons.

In 2014 Gerhard Maria Wagner published with Norbert Blaichinger Heaven or Hell in German, characterizing Liturgia verbi as competitive among priests and lay people. Vienna weekly Falter had called Wagner's positions fundamentalist obscurantism in 2010.
