= Josephus Calasanz Fließer =

Austrian priest

- Bishop of Linz
- Church: Catholic Church
- Diocese: Diocese of Linz
- In office: 11 May 1946 – 1 January 1956
- Predecessor: Johannes Maria Gföllner
- Successor: Franz Zauner
- Other post: Titular Bishop of Binda (1956-1960)
- Previous posts: Titular Bishop of Gargara (1941-1946); Auxiliary Bishop of Linz (1941-1946)

Orders
- Ordination: 28 June 1919
- Consecration: 11 May 1941 by Johannes Maria Gföllner

Personal details
- Born: 28 July 1896 Perg, Archduchy of Upper Austria, Cisleithania, Austria-Hungary
- Died: 12 June 1960 (aged 63)

Josephus Calasanz Fließer (born 28 July 1896 in Perg; died 12 June 1960) was an Austrian clergyman and bishop for the Roman Catholic Diocese of Linz. Josephus was ordained to priesthood in 1919 and then appointed a bishop in 1946. He is most remembered for his pragmatic policy towards the Nazis, and particularly his attempt to dissuade Bl. Franz Jägerstätter from resisting conscription. He died in 1960.
