= Rudolph Hittmair =

Austrian priest

Rudolf Hittmair
- Bishop of Linz
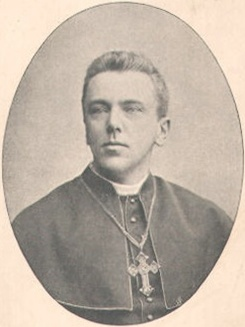
- Church: Catholic Church
- Diocese: Diocese of Linz
- In office: 14 April 1909 – 5 March 1915
- Predecessor: Franz Maria Doppelbauer
- Successor: Johannes Maria Gföllner

Orders
- Ordination: 29 July 1888
- Consecration: 1 May 1909 by Gennaro Granito Pignatelli di Belmonte

Personal details
- Born: 23 July 1859 Mattighofen, Archduchy of Upper Austria, Austrian Empire
- Died: 5 March 1915 (aged 55)

Rudolph Hittmair (born 23 July 1859 in Mattighofen; died 5 March 1915) was an Austrian clergyman and bishop for the Roman Catholic Diocese of Linz. He was ordained in 1888. He was appointed bishop in 1909. He died in 1915.
