= Wartberg ob der Aist =

- Municipality
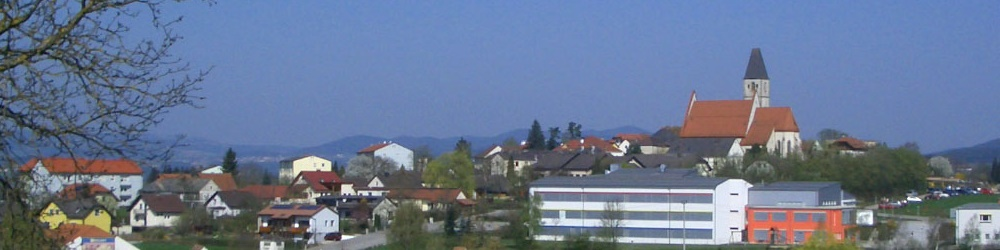
- General view

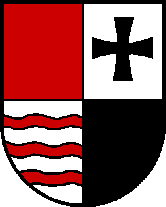
- Coat of arms

- Location within Austria
- Coordinates: 48°20′50″N 14°30′30″E
- Country: Austria
- State: Upper Austria
- District: Freistadt

Government
  - Mayor: Dietmar Stegfellner (SPÖ)

Area
  - Total: 19.4 km^{2} (7.5 sq mi)
- Elevation: 477 m (1,565 ft)

Population (2018-01-01)
  - Total: 4,222
  - Density: 218/km^{2} (564/sq mi)
- Time zone: UTC+1 (CET)
  - Summer (DST): UTC+2 (CEST)
- Postal code: 4224
- Area code: 07236
- Vehicle registration: FR
- Website: www.wartberg-aist.at

Wartberg ob der Aist is a municipality in the district of Freistadt in the Austrian state of Upper Austria.

== Population ==
Historical population
| Year | Pop. | ±% |
|---|---|---|
| 1869 | 1,398 | — |
| 1880 | 1,576 | +12.7% |
| 1890 | 1,668 | +5.8% |
| 1900 | 1,703 | +2.1% |
| 1910 | 1,772 | +4.1% |
| 1923 | 1,726 | −2.6% |
| 1934 | 1,704 | −1.3% |
| 1939 | 1,581 | −7.2% |
| 1951 | 1,873 | +18.5% |
| 1961 | 1,916 | +2.3% |
| 1971 | 2,409 | +25.7% |
| 1981 | 2,763 | +14.7% |
| 1991 | 3,190 | +15.5% |
| 2001 | 3,731 | +17.0% |

== Personalities ==
Wartberg is the birthplace of Austrian Roman Catholic church official Gerhard Maria Wagner.
