= Johannes Maria Gföllner =

Austrian priest

Johannes Evangelist Maria Gföllner
- Bishop of Linz
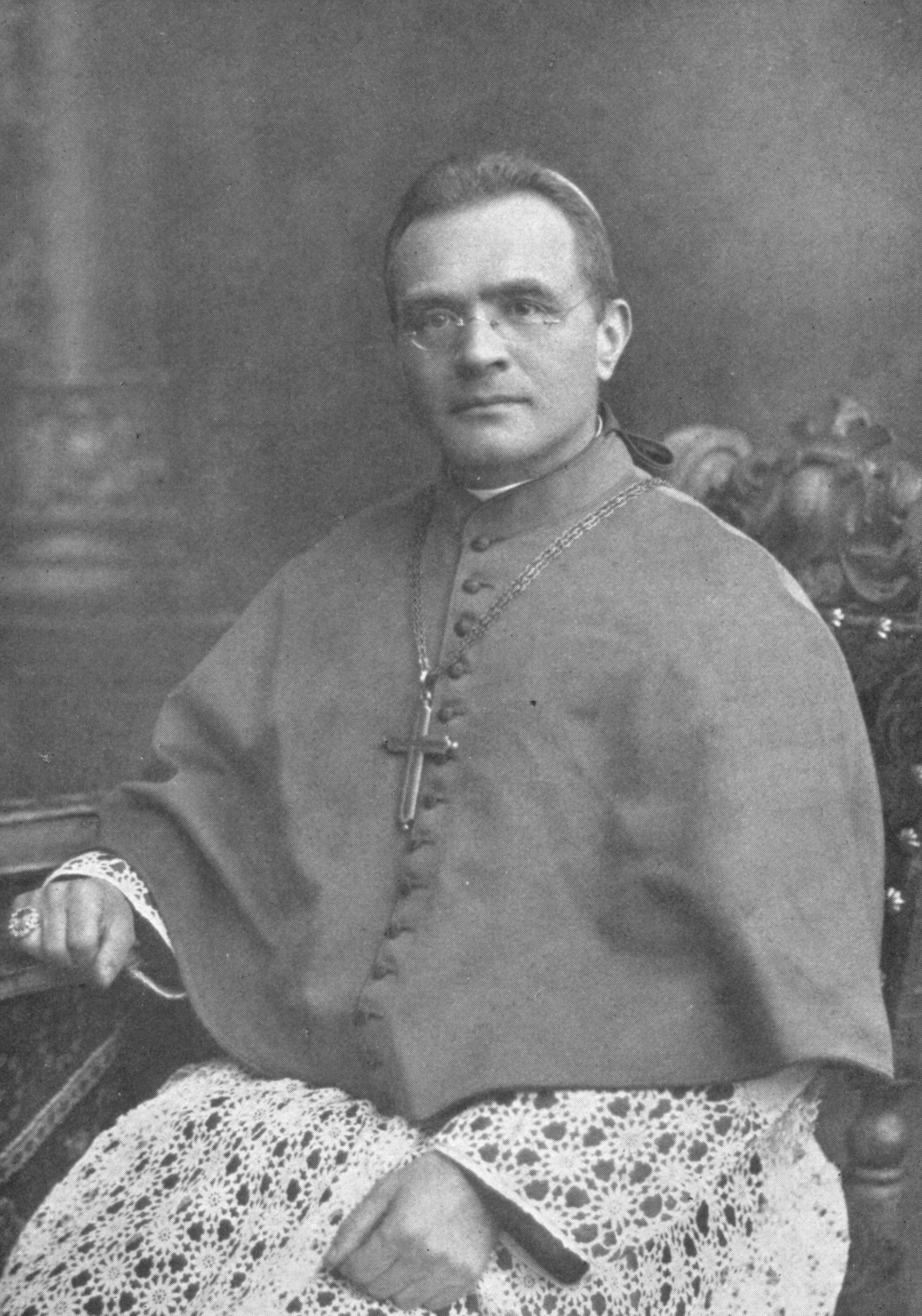
- Johannes Maria Gföllner in 1917
- Church: Catholic Church
- Diocese: Diocese of Linz
- In office: 19 August 1915 – 3 June 1941
- Predecessor: Rudolph Hittmair
- Successor: Josephus Calasanz Fließer

Orders
- Ordination: 28 October 1893
- Consecration: 18 October 1915 by Friedrich Gustav Piffl

Personal details
- Born: 17 December 1867 Waizenkirchen, Archduchy of Upper Austria, Cislethania, Austria-Hungary
- Died: 3 June 1941 (aged 73) Linz, Reichsgau Oberdonau, Nazi Germany

Johannes Evangelist Maria Gföllner (17 December 1867, Waizenkirchen – 3 June 1941, Linz) was an Austrian clergyman and bishop for the Roman Catholic Diocese of Linz.

He was ordained a priest on 28 October 1893 in Rome and went on to teach in several institutions; he was appointed a bishop on 16 July 1915.

In 1933 he wrote a pastoral letter entitled "On True and False Nationalism’’ warning of the dangers of National Socialism; this letter had a circulation of about 35,000. He later refused to meet Hitler during his visit to Linz.

A street in Linz was named after him; however, in 2022, the local council decided to change the name of the street due to his public anti-Semitism.
