= Gregorius Thomas Ziegler =

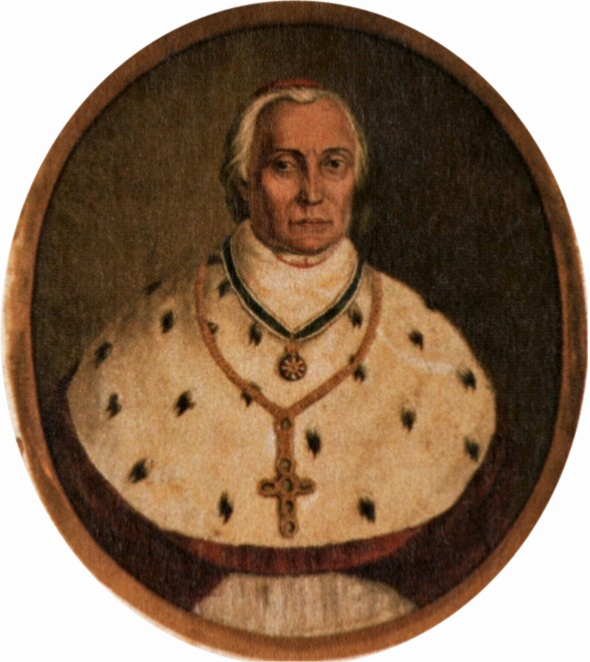
Gregorius Thomas Ziegler

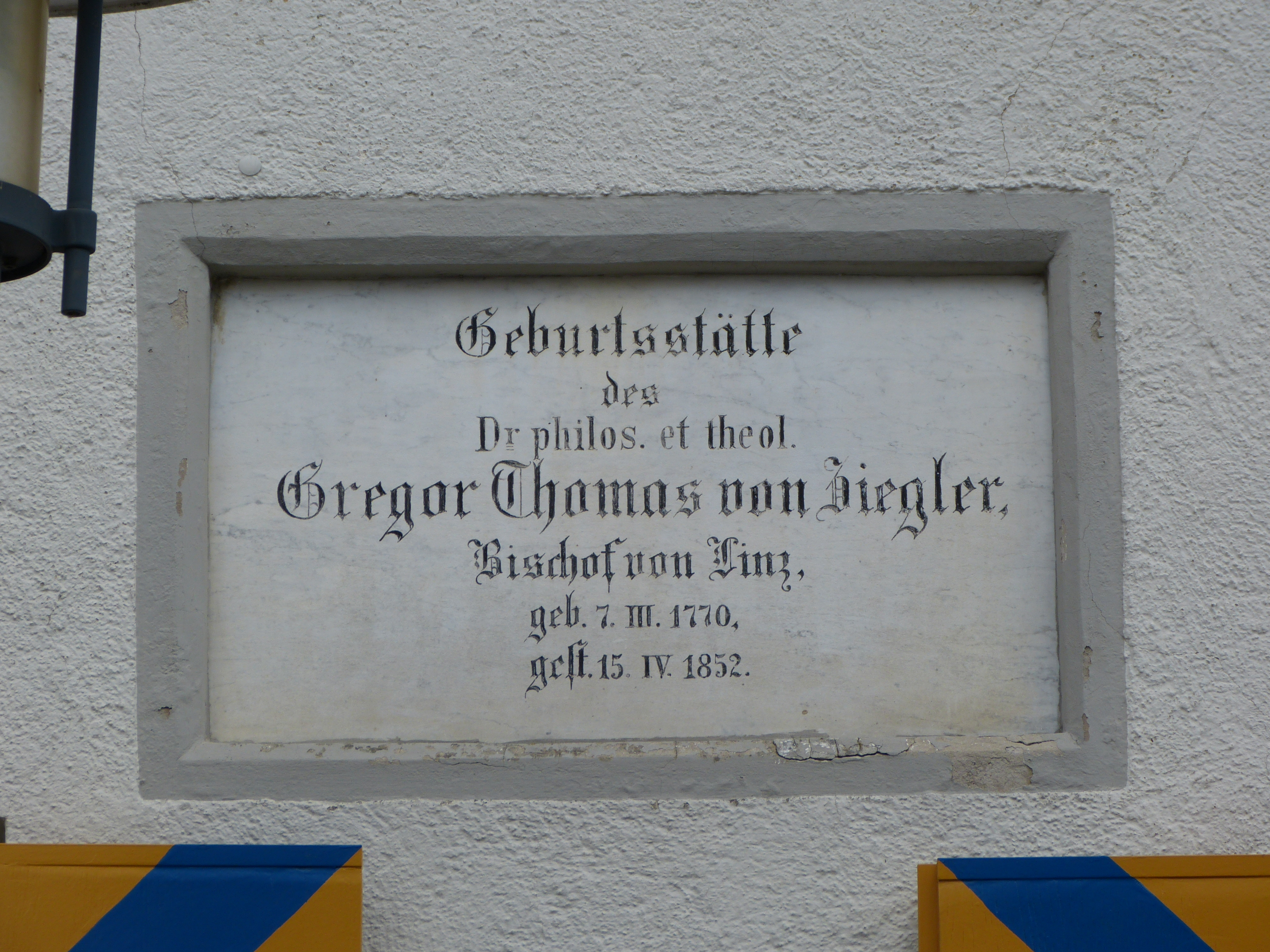
Inscription on Ziegler's birthplace in Kirchheim in Schwaben

Gregorius Thomas Ziegler was bishop of Linz from 7 March 1770 until 15 April 1852. He worked to strengthen the Catholic church in Austria, introducing a number of religious orders to his diocese.

== Biography ==
=== Early life ===
Ziegler was born at Kirchheim in Schwaben near Augsburg. He joined the Benedictines at Wiblingen Abbey in 1788 and was ordained priest on 25 May 1793. He taught in various Benedictine institutions until he became prior of Wiblingen.

After the dissolution of Wiblingen abbey in 1806 he removed with some of his confreres to Tyniec in Poland and taught theology at the neighbouring University of Cracow. When the Benedictines were forced to leave Tyniec in 1809 he was engaged as professor of church history at the Lyceum of Linz, 1809–15, and of theology at Vienna, 1815-22. On 2 February 1822, he became bishop of the new diocese of Tyniec, but transferred his see to Tarnów, where he began the erection of a seminary and renovated the cathedral. The diocese changed its name in Diocese of Tarnow in April 1826 (but Tarnow was previously a diocese in 1783-1805).

=== Bishop of Linz ===
On April 13, 1827, Ziegler was promoted to the diocese of Linz, where he remained until his death.

Although the Catholic church throughout Austria at this date was still dependent to a very great degree on the government in ecclesiastical matters, Ziegler worked to revive and strengthen the ecclesiastical spirit in his clergy and people. With the support of Archduke Maximilian of Este, he introduced the Jesuits to the area, settling them on the Freinberg near Linz. He also founded numerous other religious establishments (Franciscans, Salesians, Sisters of Mercy, etc.).

The Revolution of 1848 not only increased political liberty, but also gave to the Catholic church greater independence in its own province. Ziegler at once made use of the regained freedom to revive popular missions, which had been discontinued since the reign of Maria Theresa. In 1850 at his instance a ten day's mission was held by the Redemptorists, at which the number of communicants was reckoned at 50,000. In the same year, the diocesan theological institute was placed entirely under episcopal supervision, and an examination of candidates for the position of parish priests was established; in October for the first time examinations were held by prosynodal examiners.

== Works ==
Ziegler's works include:

- Die Feier der heil. Firmung in der Kath. Kirche (Vienna, 1817)
- Das Kath. Glaubensprincip (Vienna, 1823)
- Züge und Schilderungern aus dem Leben des sel. Seb. Franz Job (Linz, 1835)

He also wrote various minor works, pastoral letters, occasional lectures, and sermons. In addition, Ziegler re-edited Klypfel's Institutiones theologiae dogmaticae (Vienna, 1819–21) and contributed various theological treatises to Jakob Frint's Theologische Zeitschrift (Vienna, 1813–16).
