= New Cathedral, Linz =

New Cathedral
- Cathedral of the Immaculate Conception
- Mariä-Empfängnis-Dom (German)
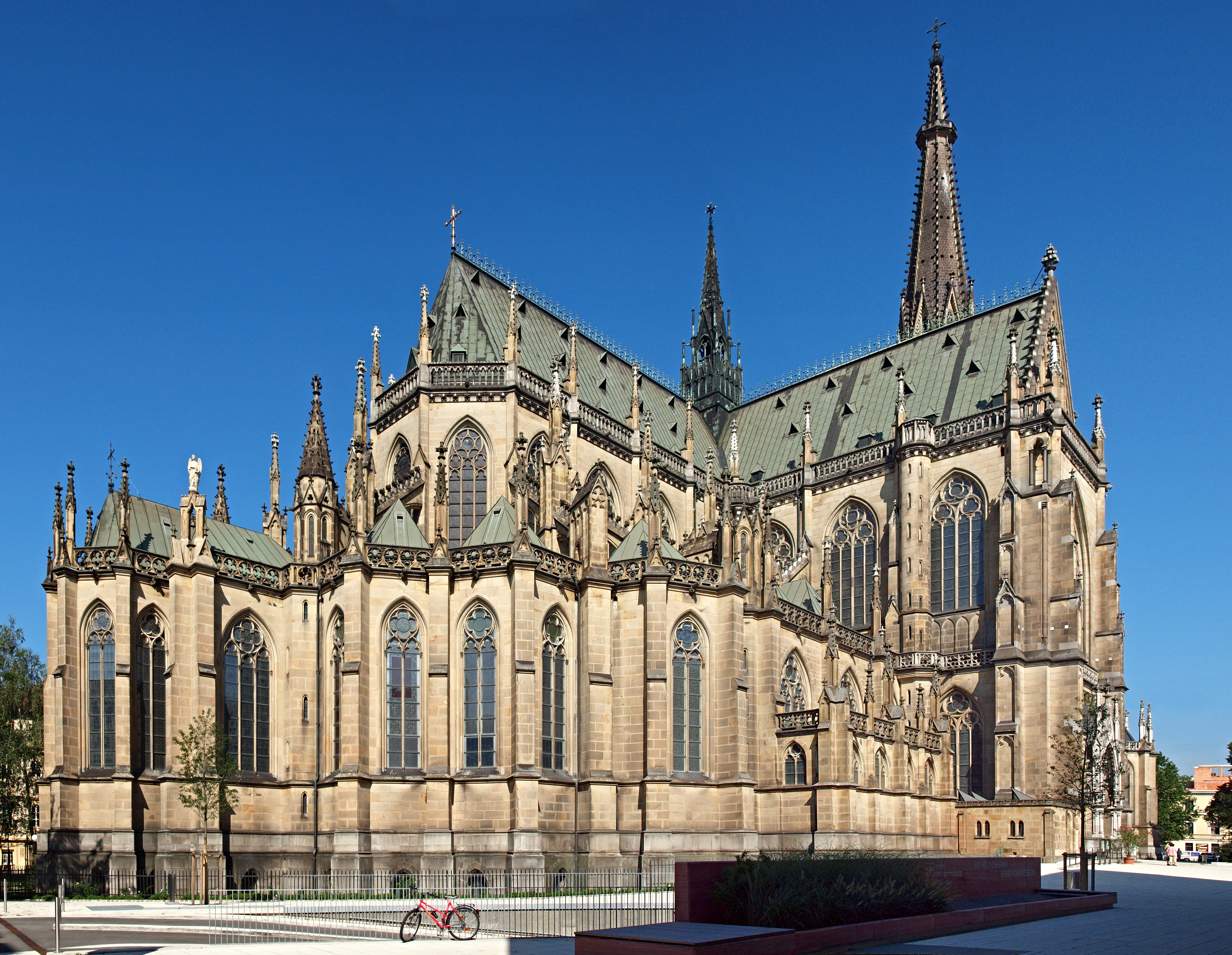

- Location within Austria
- 48°18′2″N 14°17′8″E
- Location: Linz
- Country: Austria
- Denomination: Catholic Church
- Sui iuris church: Latin Church

History
- Status: Cathedral

Architecture
- Functional status: Active
- Style: Gothic Revival
- Years built: 1862–1924

Specifications
- Length: 130 metres (430 ft)
- Height: 135 metres (443 ft)

Administration
- Province: Vienna
- Diocese: Linz

Clergy
- Bishop: Manfred Scheuer

The New Cathedral (German: Neuer Dom), also known as the Cathedral of the Immaculate Conception (German: Mariä-Empfängnis-Dom; Mariendom), is a Roman Catholic cathedral located in Linz, Austria. The neo-Gothic church is the largest church building in Austria.

== History ==
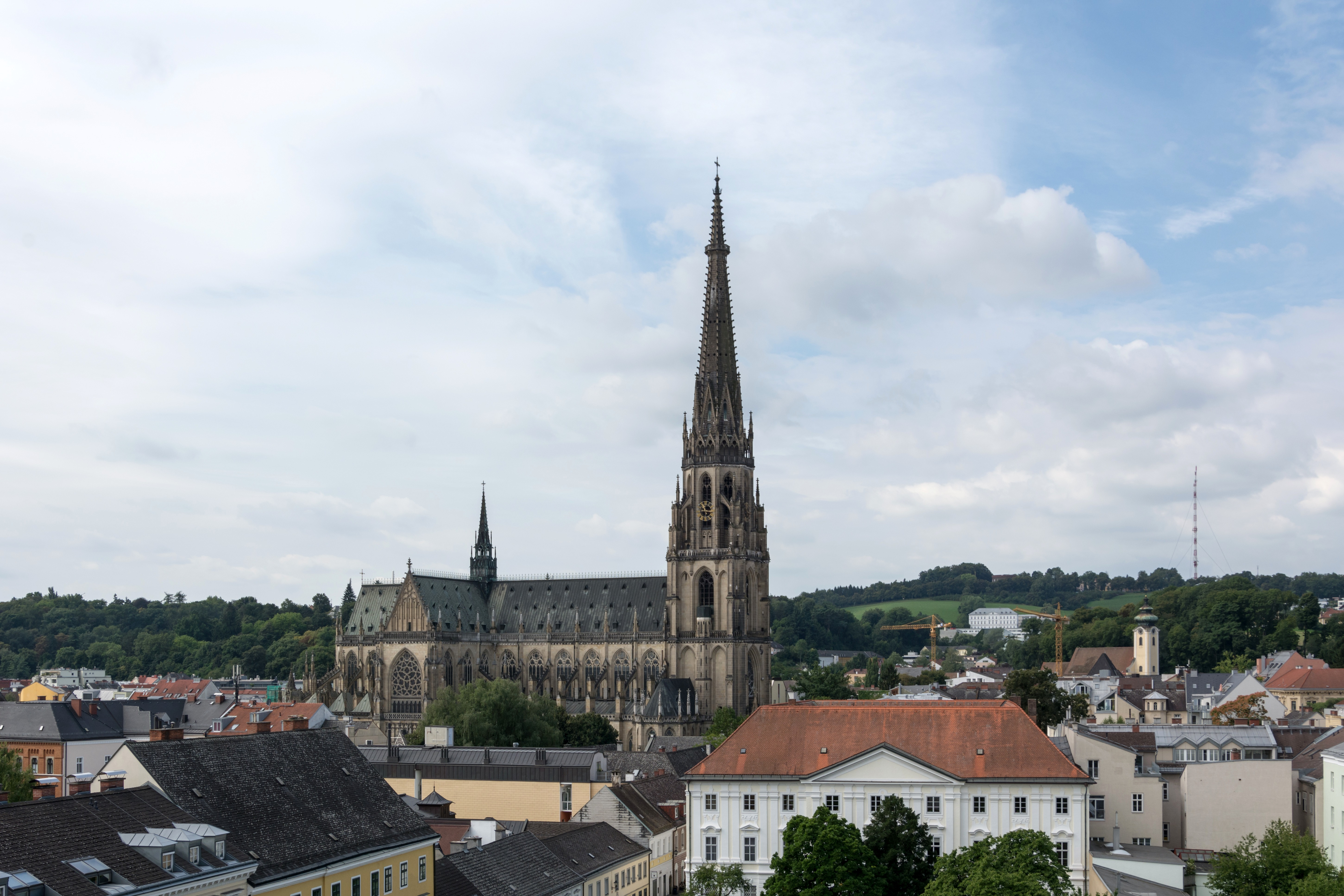
View of the New Cathedral in Linz

Construction plans were started in 1855 by Bishop Franz-Josef Rudigier. The first stone was laid on 1 May 1862—an event solemnised by the performance of Anton Bruckner's Festive Cantata Preiset den Herrn.

In 1924 Bishop Johannes Maria Gföllner consecrated the finished building as the Cathedral of the Immaculate Conception. The plans, drawn by the master builder of the Archdiocese of Cologne, Vincenz Statz, were made in the French high Gothic style.

With room for 20,000 people, the cathedral is the largest (130 meters long, and the floor area 5,170 square meters), but not the highest, church in Austria. The originally-planned, higher spire was not approved, because in Austria-Hungary at the time, no building was allowed to be taller than the South Tower of the St. Stephen's Cathedral in Vienna. At 134.6 m, the New Cathedral is two meters shorter than the Viennese cathedral.

Particularly noteworthy are the cathedral's stained glass windows. The most famous is the Linz Window, which depicts the history of Linz. The windows also contain portraits of the various sponsors of the church's construction. During the Second World War some windows, particularly in the southern part of the cathedral, were damaged. Instead of restoring the original windows, they have been replaced with windows displaying modern art. Also noteworthy is the nativity scene in the church burial vault, with its figures made by S. Osterrieder, the display of the regalia of Bishop Rudigier and the great organ (so called "Rudigierorgel") built in 1968 by the famous Danish organ builder Marcussen & Søn.

== Politics ==
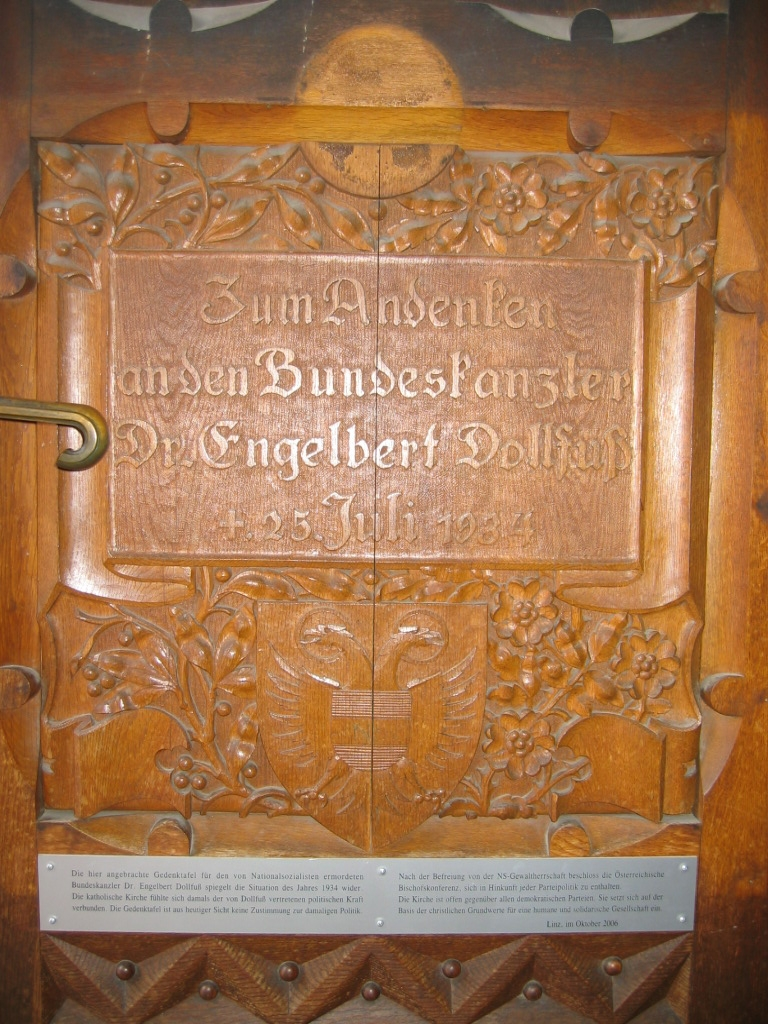
Commemorative cut with plaquet

In October 2006 the Catholic Church added a plaquet to the commemorative wood cut for Engelbert Dollfuß at the New Cathedral, which caused excitement in the ÖVP. In the plaque the church, by resolution of the Austrian Conference of Catholic Bishops, distances itself from the original cut and proclaims the future abstention from party politics. Dollfuß as acting Chancellor of Austria in 1933 eliminated the parliament over formal irregularities. This caused the Austrian Civil War and led to a dictatorship.

== Bells ==
The cathedral has seven swinging bells hung in the tower, placed on two levels; they were all cast by Anton Gugg in 1901. The lower level contains the largest bell or bourdon known as "Immaculata" and it weighs 8 tons, while the upper level contains the rest of the bells. The bourdon used to hang on the upper floor next to the other bells, but just a year after the bell system was completed it had to be moved down one floor due to the tower swaying too much to be relocated. The theee largest bells also serve as clock bells: Peter chimes every quarter hour, while Joseph and the bourdon Immaculata in succession each chime the number of a full hour. In Austria, the bells are always numbered from largest to smallest, Bell 1 is always the tenor or bourdon.

No.	Surname	Weight (kg)	Note (Nominal)	Floor
1	Immaculata (Bourdon Bell)	8,120	F_{0}−	Lower
2	Josephi	3,930	A_{0}	Upper
3	Peter	2,370	C_{1}−	Upper
4	Pilger	1,640	C_{1}−	Upper
5	Agnes	940	F_{1}−	Upper
6	Maximilian	480	A_{1}	Upper
7	Michaelmas	290	C_{2}−	Upper

== Gallery ==
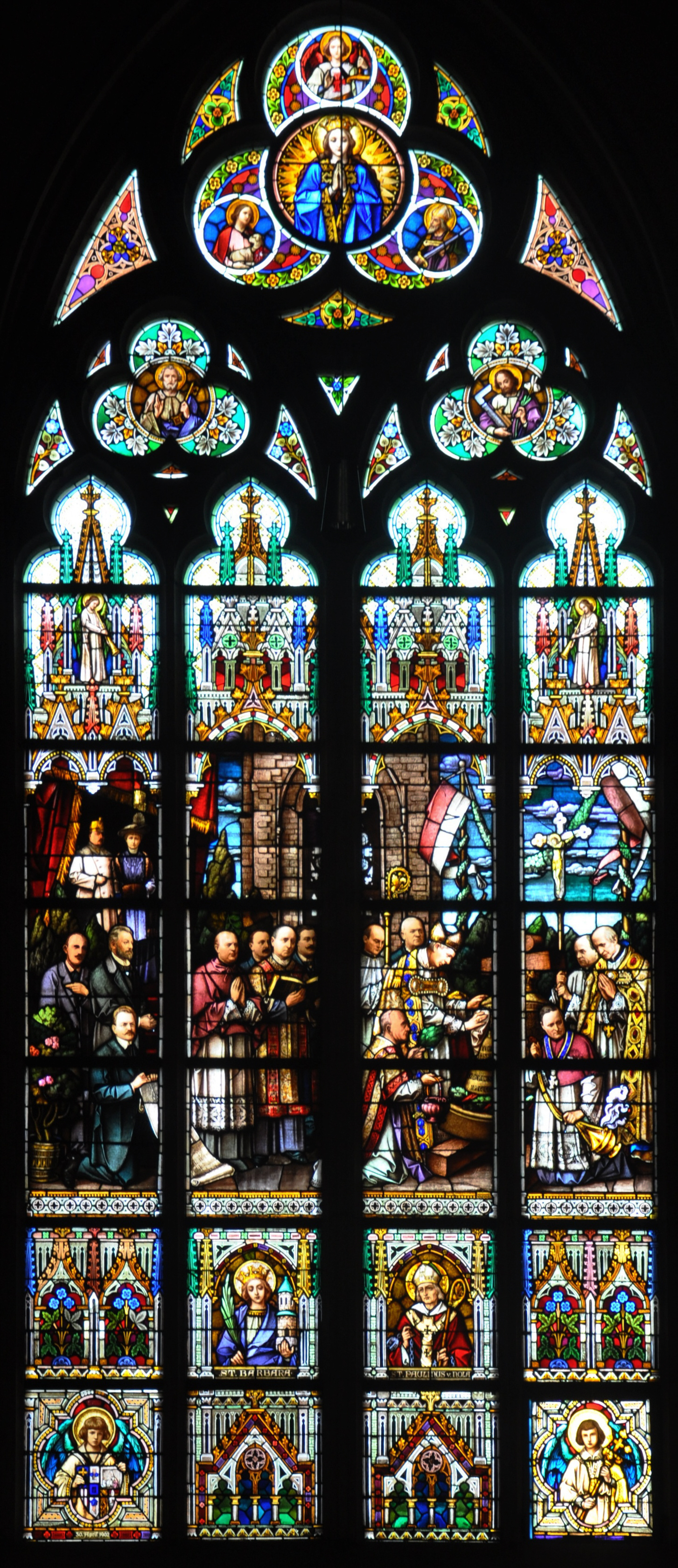

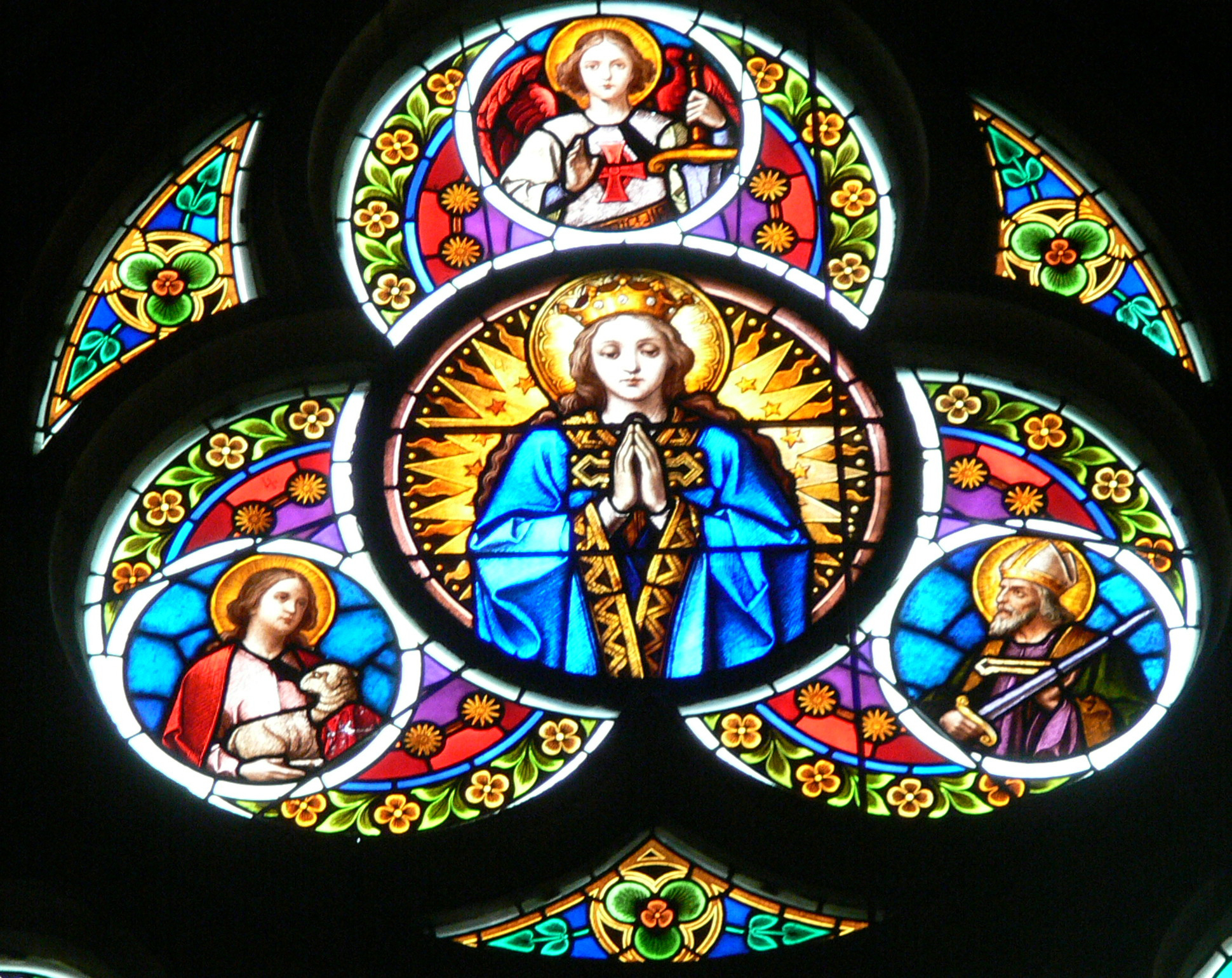

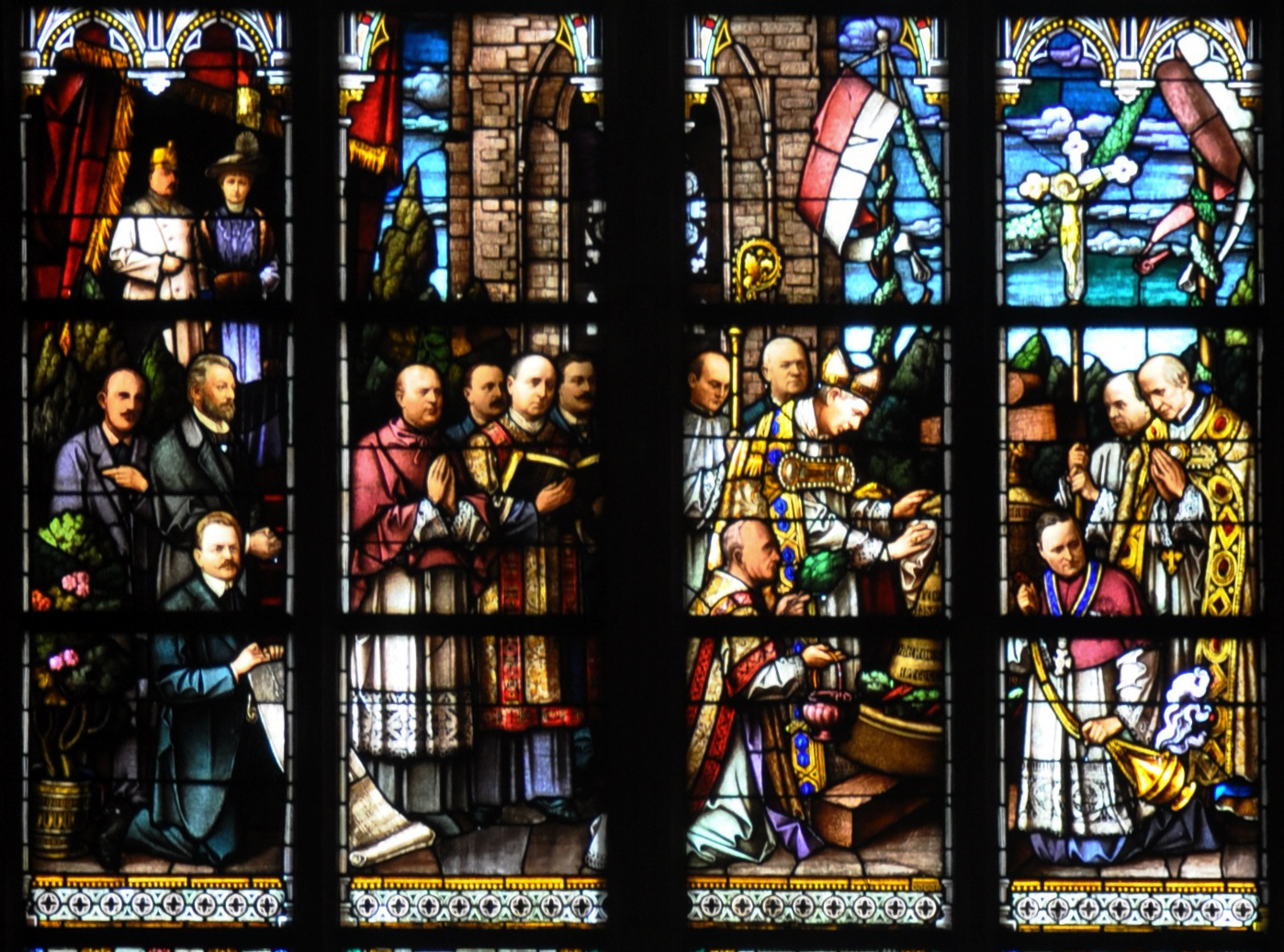
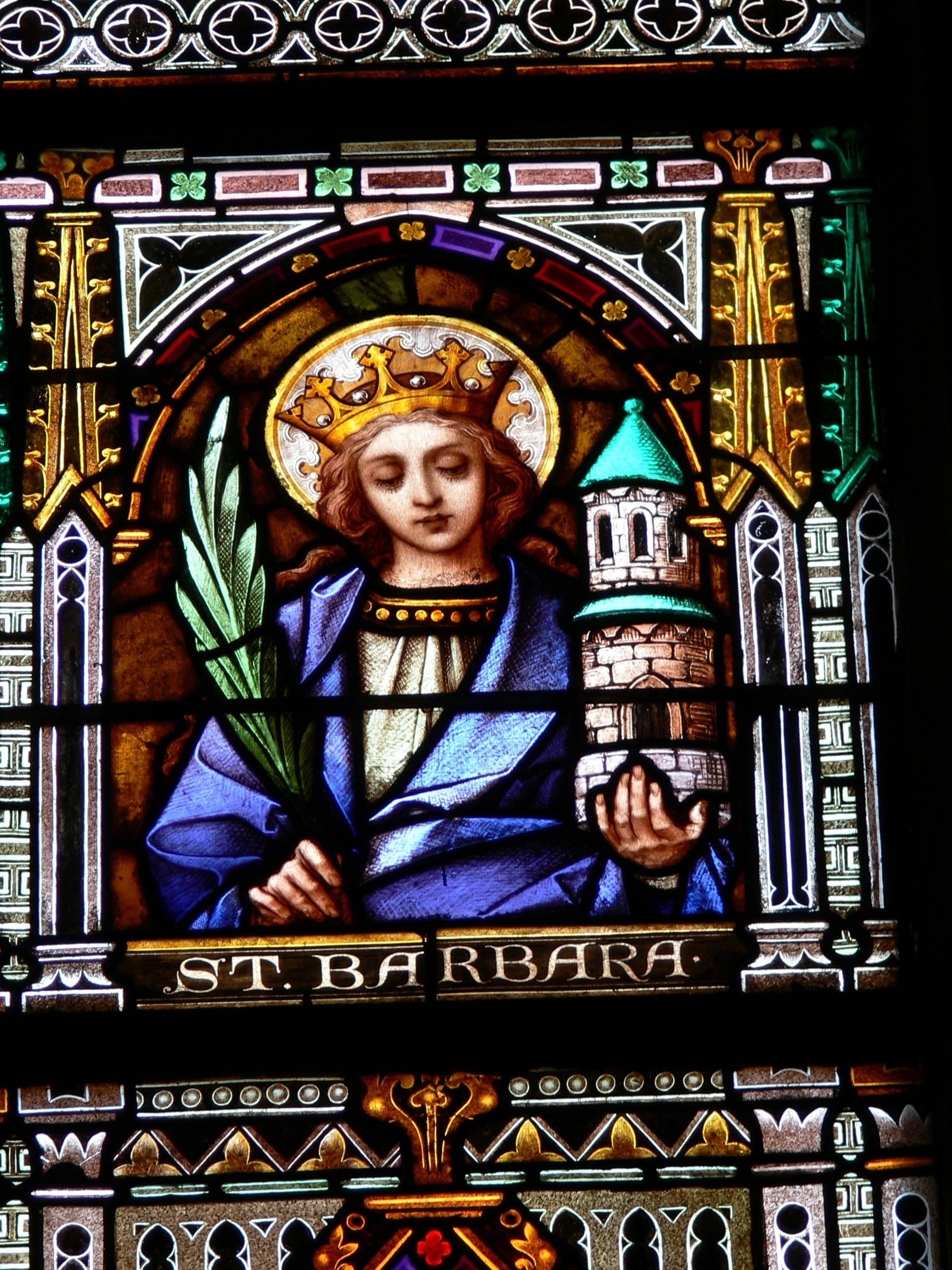
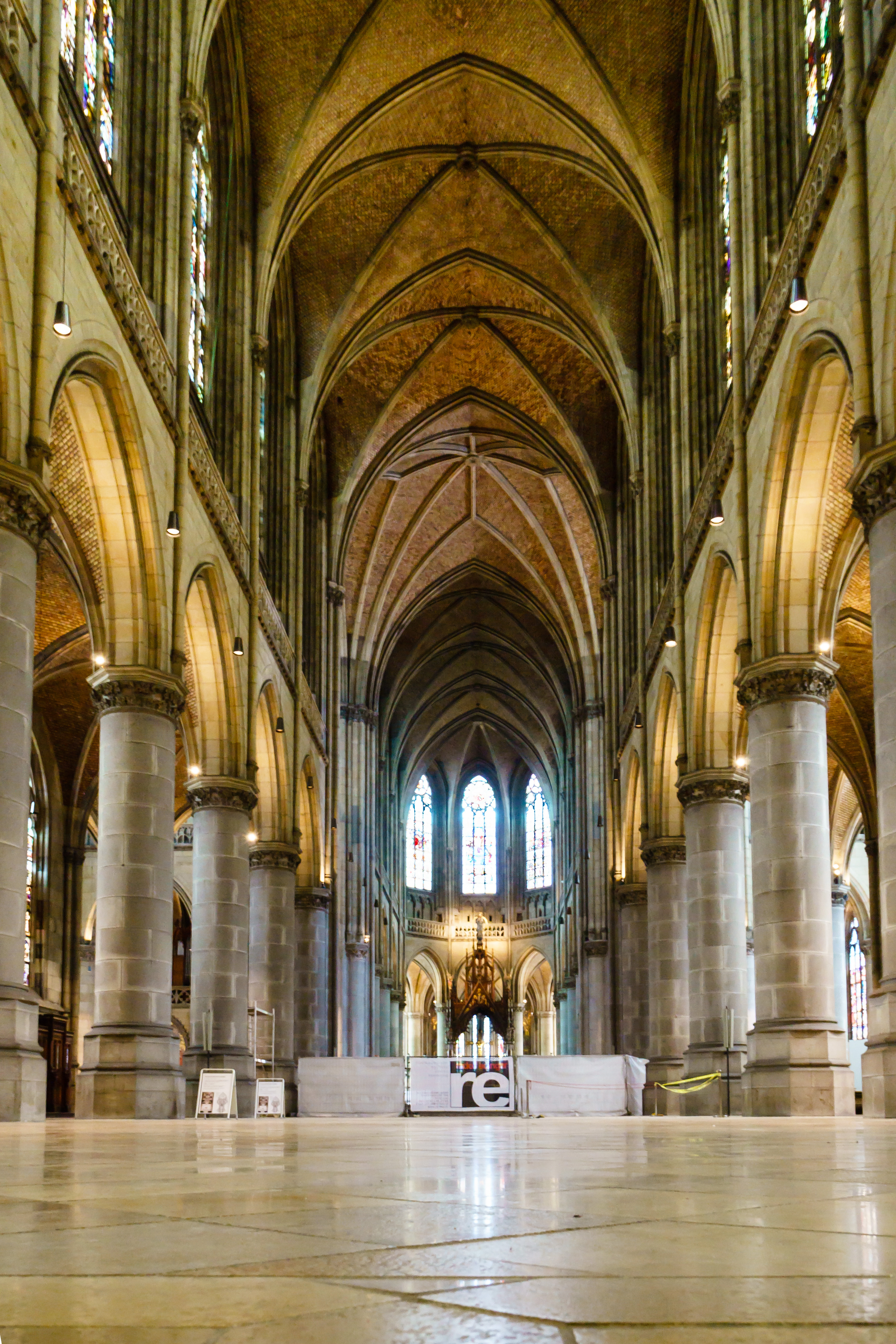
Interior of the cathedral, eastern direction

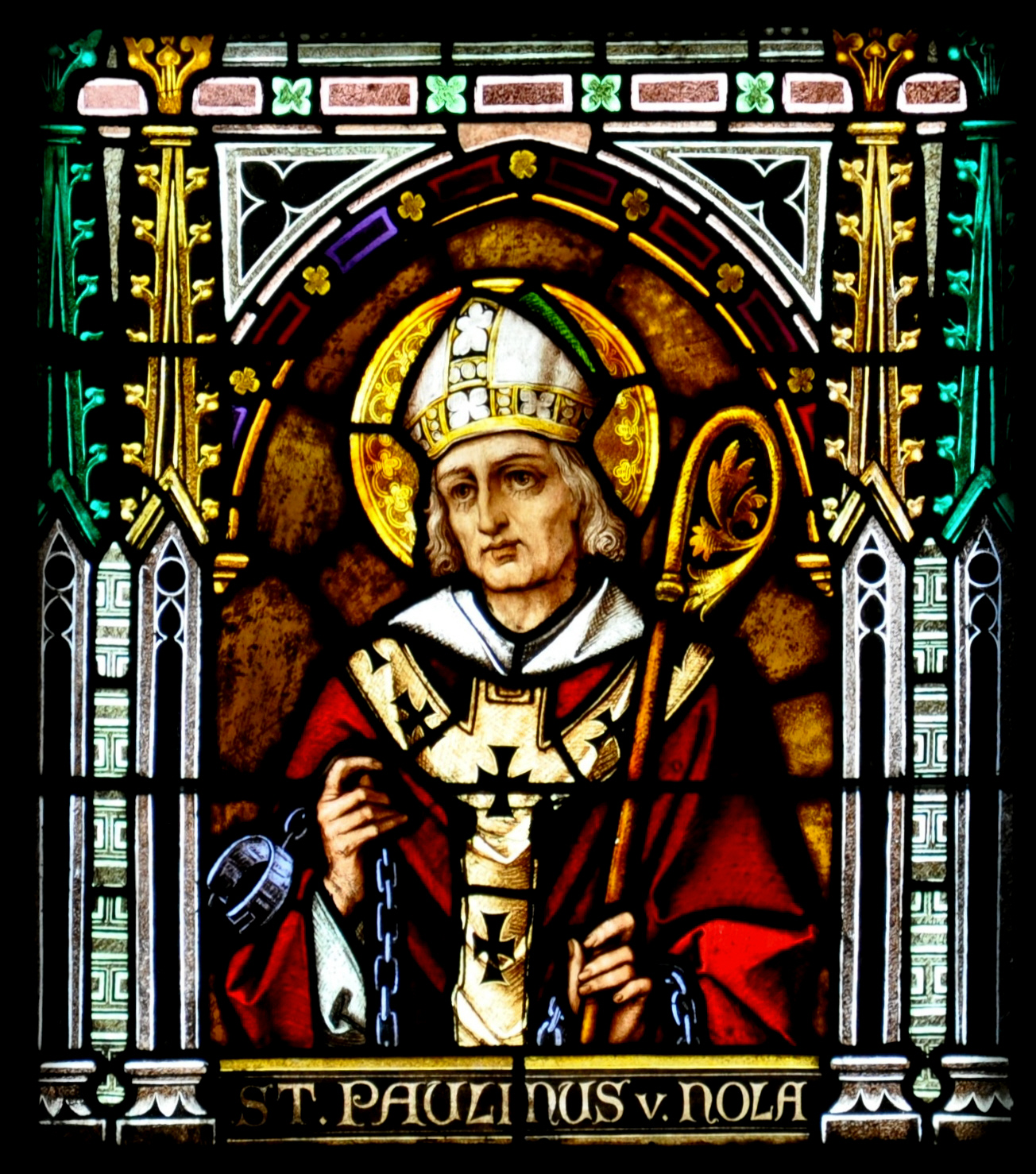
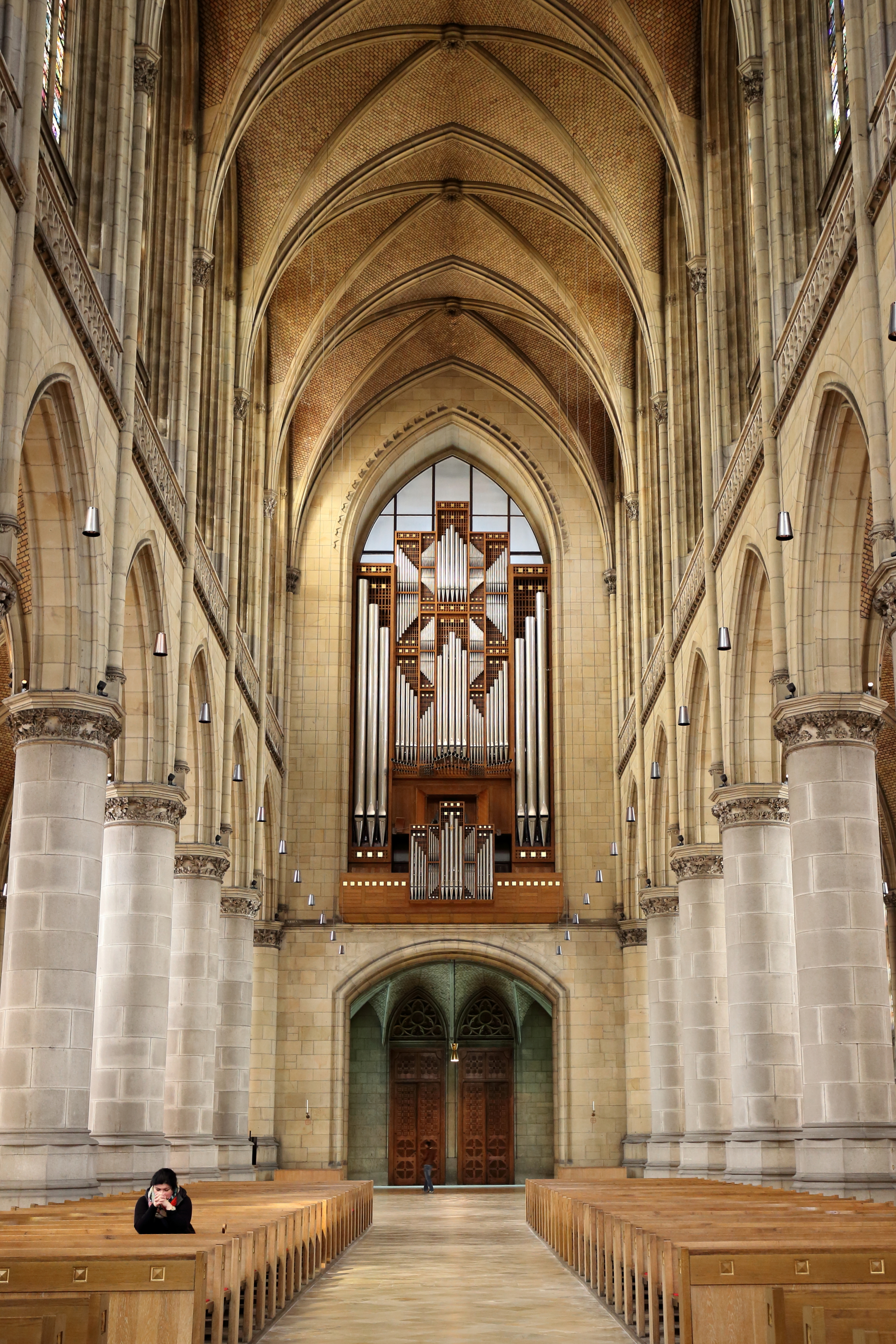
Interior of the cathedral, western direction

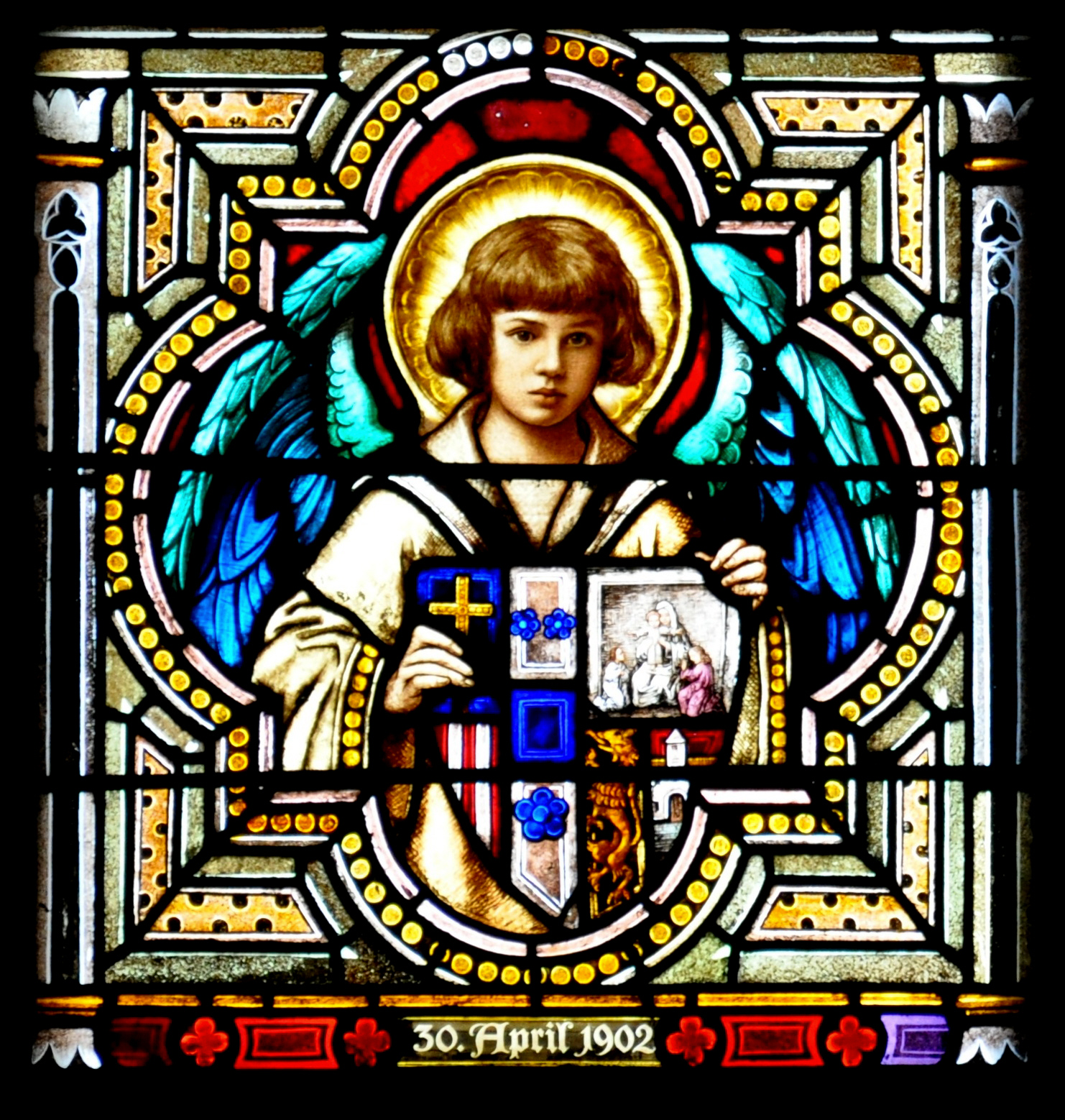
