= Franz Maria Doppelbauer =

Austrian bishop (1845–1908)

- Bishop of Linz
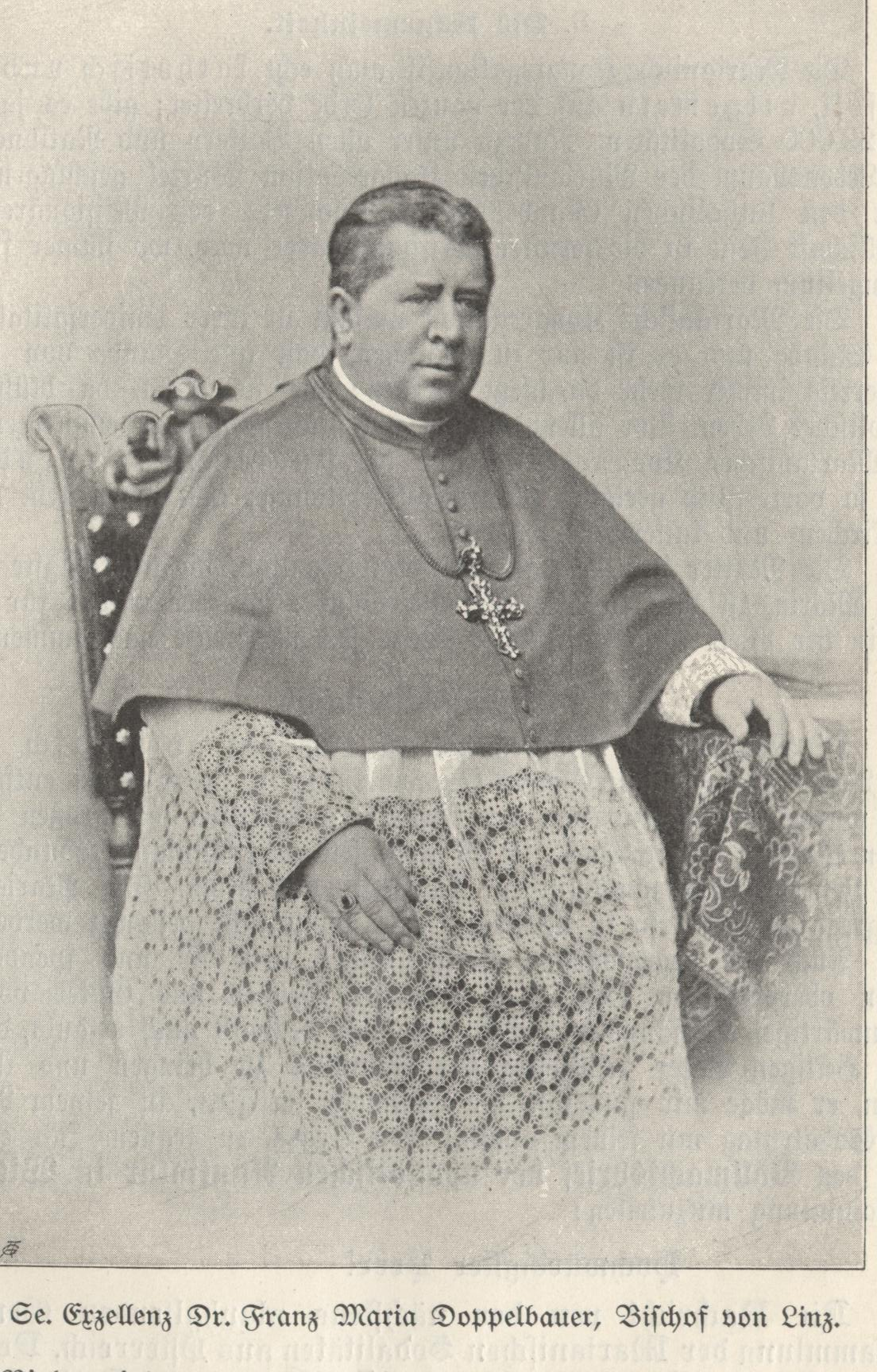
- Franz Maria Doppelbauer, Bishop of Linz
- In office: 1889–1908

Personal details
- Born: 21 January 1845
- Died: 2 December 1908 (aged 63)

Franz Maria Doppelbauer (21 January 1845 – 2 December 1908) was the Catholic bishop of Linz from 1889 to 1908.

Doppelbauer established a newspaper and founded a seminary, the Petrinum, in Urfahr.

Doppelbauer also founded a boy's seminary, the Petrinum, in Urfahr for training future clergy. Moreover, he was responsible for completion of the Linz cathedral in May 1905.
