= Eukarpia =

Ancient city in Turkey

Coordinates: 38°28′20″N 30°07′11″E

Eucarpia or Eukarpia (Ancient Greek: Εὐκαρπία and Εὐκάρπεια) was a city in Phrygia and a bishopric in the late Roman province of Phrygia Salutaris, in Asia Minor.

== Name ==
Eukarpia literally means 'fruitfulness' or 'fertility' in Greek, and it was named because of the fertility of the land.

According to local legend, Zeus gave the land of Eukarpia to Demeter and Dionysus, the deities associated with agriculture, grain, wine, and fertility.

== Location ==
Eukarpia, mentioned by Strabo (XII, 576) and several other geographers, was situated not far from the sources of the Maeander River, on a road from Dorylaeum to Eumeneia, between the Dorylaeum-Acmonia and Dorylaeum-Synnada roads, probably at the modern Emirhissar, between K-Hırka and Emirhisar (Hüyük) in Afyonkarahisar Province.

It was situated in a very fertile district, to which it is said to have been indebted for its name. The vine especially grew there very luxuriously.

Imposing ruins, seen by Hamilton in 1837, have almost disappeared. Little is known about the history of the city. Under Roman dominion, Eucarpia belonged to the conventus of Synnada, to the southwest of which city it was situated. It struck its own coins from the time of Augustus until the reign of Volusianus.

== Notable people ==
- Metrophanes of Eukarpia (Μητροφάνης) was an ancient Greek sophist and historian.

== Ecclesiastical history ==
The bishopric, a suffragan of Synnada, figures in the Notitiae episcopatuum until the twelfth or thirteenth century. Six bishops are known:

- Eugenius, present at the Council of Nicaea (325),
- Auxomenus in 381,
- Cyriacus in 451,
- Dionysius in 536,
- Constantine or Constans in 787 (not mentioned by Le Quien), and Constantine in 879.

Eukarpia is included in the Catholic Church's list of titular sees.
