= Joseph Anton Gall =

- Bishop of Linz
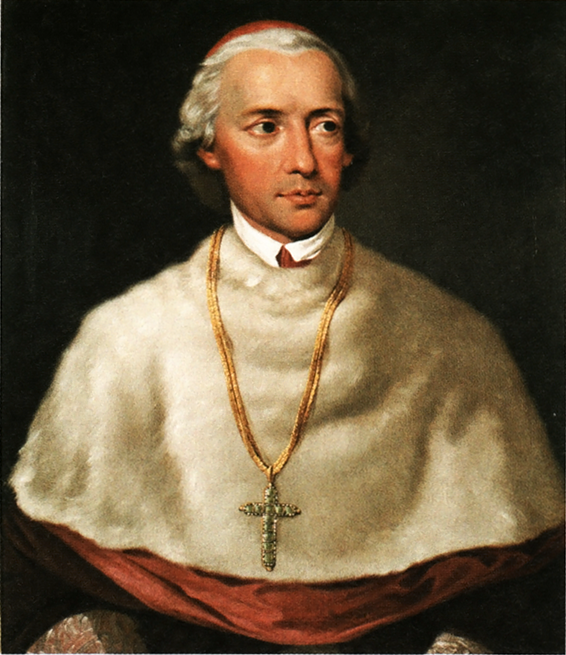
- Church: Roman Catholic Church
- Diocese: Diocese of Linz
- Installed: 1 March 1789
- Term ended: 18 June 1807
- Predecessor: Ernst Johann Nepomuk von Herberstein
- Successor: Sigismund von Hohenwart

Orders
- Ordination: 1772

Personal details
- Born: March 27, 1748 Weil der Stadt, Holy Roman Empire
- Died: June 18, 1807 (aged 59)
- Denomination: Roman Catholic
- Education: Heidelberg

Joseph Anton Gall (27 March 1748 – 18 June 1807) was the bishop of Linz from 1788 to 1807.

== Early life and education ==
He was born in Weil de Stadt. He was one of eleven children of Anton Gall, who was the mayor of Weil de Stadt.

He studied philosophy, theology and law at Heidelberg.

He was ordained as a priest in 1772.

He had an interest in education and was influenced by Johann Ignaz von Felbiger, the Abbot of Sagan. He taught at the Normal School in Vienna for four years. He was then appointed court chaplain by Empress Maria Theresa and went on to become Chief Overseer of Schools in Lower Austria.

He had been of great service to the Austrian school system as cathedral scholasticus and chief supervisor of the normal schools. He was an adherent of Josephinism, and permitted the chancellor of the chapter, George Rechberger, a layman and Josephinist, to exercise great influence over the ecclesiastical administration of his diocese.

He was appointed as Bishop of Linz in 1788 and took up the post on 1 March 1789. He served at this post until his death.

Ecclesiastical conditions became more satisfactory during his episcopate, but much of the credit for this is due to Emperors Leopold II and Francis II who repealed many over-hasty reforms of Joseph II.

The general seminaries introduced in 1783 were set aside, and the training of the clergy was again made the care of the bishops. Bishop Gall, therefore, exerted himself for years to establish a theological institute for his diocese; it was opened in 1794.

Another permanent service of the bishop was the founding of a seminary for priests; for this he bought in 1804 a house out of his own means, and made the institution heir to all his property.

== Legacy ==
in Weil der Stadt there is a street named after him, as well as the Gall House on the market square.
