= List of museums in Styria =

This list of museums in the state of Styria, Austria contains museums which are defined for this context as institutions (including nonprofit organizations, government entities, and private businesses) that collect and care for objects of cultural, artistic, scientific, or historical interest and make their collections or related exhibits available for public viewing. Also included are non-profit art galleries and university art galleries.

== The list ==
Name	Location	Type	Summary
Admont Abbey	Admont	Multiple	Tours of the Benedictine monastery with Baroque architecture and museum collections of art, manuscripts and natural history displays
Archaeology Museum of the University of Graz	Graz	Archaeology	website, original artifacts and casts of sculptures from Ancient Greece and Rome
Austrian Aviation Museum	Graz	Aviation	website
Austrian Open Air Museum Stübing	Stuebing	Open-air	website, historic rural buildings from all over Austria
Austrian Sculpture Park	Unterpremstätten	Art	Park with outdoor sculptures, part of Universalmuseum Joanneum
Brahms Museum Mürzzuschlag	Mürzzuschlag	Biography	website, life of composer Johannes Brahms
City Museum Graz	Graz	Local	website, city history, culture, art exhibits, includes Museumsapotheke, a complete historic pharmacy
Diocesan Museum Graz	Graz	Religious	website, historical and ecclesiastical monuments of the diocese Graz-Seckau
Dobl Transmitter	Dobl	Technology	Former radio transmitter and equipment
Erzberg Adventure	Eisenerz	Mining	website, above and below ground tours of the Erzberg mine
Folk Life Museum	Graz	Art	Pre-industrial period home life, clothing, beliefs, part of Universalmuseum Joanneum
Frida and Fred	Graz	Children's	website
Gipsmuseum	Graz	Art	website, plaster casts of ancient Greek and Roman sculpture
Gösting Castle	Gösting	History	
Hallstatt Museum	Großklein	Archaeology	website, artifacts from the Neolithic Age to the late Middle Ages, the emphasis in the Hallstatt period
Hans Gross Criminal Museum	Graz	Law enforcement	website
Hanns Schell Collection	Graz	Decorative arts	website, locks, keys, boxes, wrought and cast iron items
House of Architecture	Graz	Architecture	website
Johann Puch Museum	Graz	Automotive	website, motorcycles and cars designed by Johann Puch
Kunsthaus Graz	Graz	Art	Contemporary art including architecture, design, new media, CGI, film and photography, part of Universalmuseum Joanneum
Künstlerhaus Graz	Graz	Art	Contemporary art of Styria, part of Universalmuseum Joanneum
Museum im Palais	Graz	Art	Decorative arts including furnishings, handcrafts made of metal, wood, ivory, ceramic, glass, textiles, wrought iron, costumes, musical instruments, part of Universalmuseum Joanneum
Museum of Perception	Graz	Art	website, perceptual installations and exhibitions
Natural History Museum	Graz	Art	Opening in 2013, part of Universalmuseum Joanneum
Neue Galerie Graz	Graz	Art	Includes painting, graphic art, poster art, sculpture, photography and video, part of Universalmuseum Joanneum
Railway Museum Knittelfeld	Knittelfeld	Railway	website
Riegersburg Castle	Riegersburg	Historic house	Medieval castle with exhibits about the 17th-century age of witch hunting in Styria and the fate of two castle women during that period
Roman Museum	Wagna	Archaeology	Excavated Roman city, part of Universalmuseum Joanneum
Schloss Eggenberg	Graz	Historic house	Baroque palace complex with gardens, art, archaeology and coin collections from the Universalmuseum Joanneum
Schloss Herberstein	Sankt Johann bei Herberstein	Historic house	Medieval castle with historic gardens, a zoo and the Gironcoli Museum which features works by contemporary Austrian artist Bruno Gironcoli
Schloss Seggau	Seggauberg	Historic house	
Schloss Stainz	Stainz	Multiple	Former Baroque monastery that houses Styrian Hunting Museum and the Museum of Agriculture and Forestry, two collections of the Universalmuseum Joanneum
Schloss Trautenfels	Pürgg-Trautenfels	Multiple	Palace complex that include the Regional Landscape Museum of the Universalmuseum Joanneum, exhibits of the natural and the cultural history of the Ennstal Valley
Styrian Armory	Graz	Military	Armory with weapons, tools, suits of armour, part of Universalmuseum Joanneum
Styrian Fire Service Museum	Groß Sankt Florian	Firefighting	website
Tramway Museum Graz	Graz	Transportation	website, vintage trams
Winter Sport Museum	Mürzzuschlag	Sports	website
Pfeilburg, Fürstenfeld	Fürstenfeld	Multiple	website
