= Brahms Museum =

Brahms Museum may refer to:

- Brahms Museum (Hamburg), a museum in Hamburg, Germany
- Brahms House (Baden-Baden), a museum in Baden-Baden, Germany
- Brahms-Haus Heide, a museum in Heide, Germany
- Brahms Museum, Mürzzuschlag, a museum in Mürzzuschlag, Austria
