= Franz Ignaz Flurer =

German painter

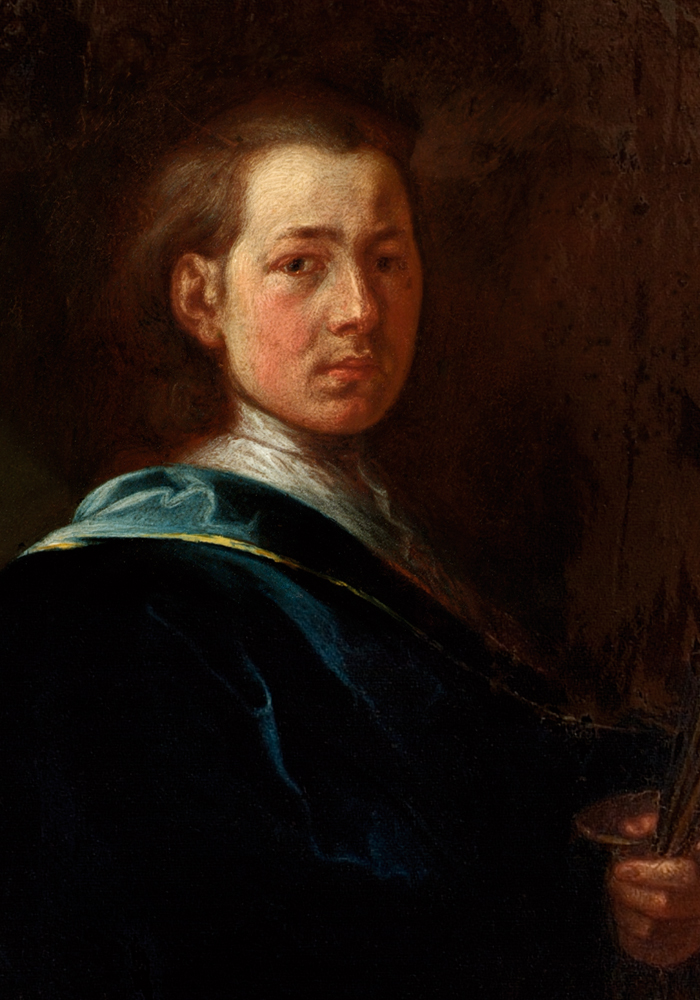
- Self-portrait (detail)
- Born: July or August 1688; Augsburg
- Died: 25 June 1742 (aged 53); Graz

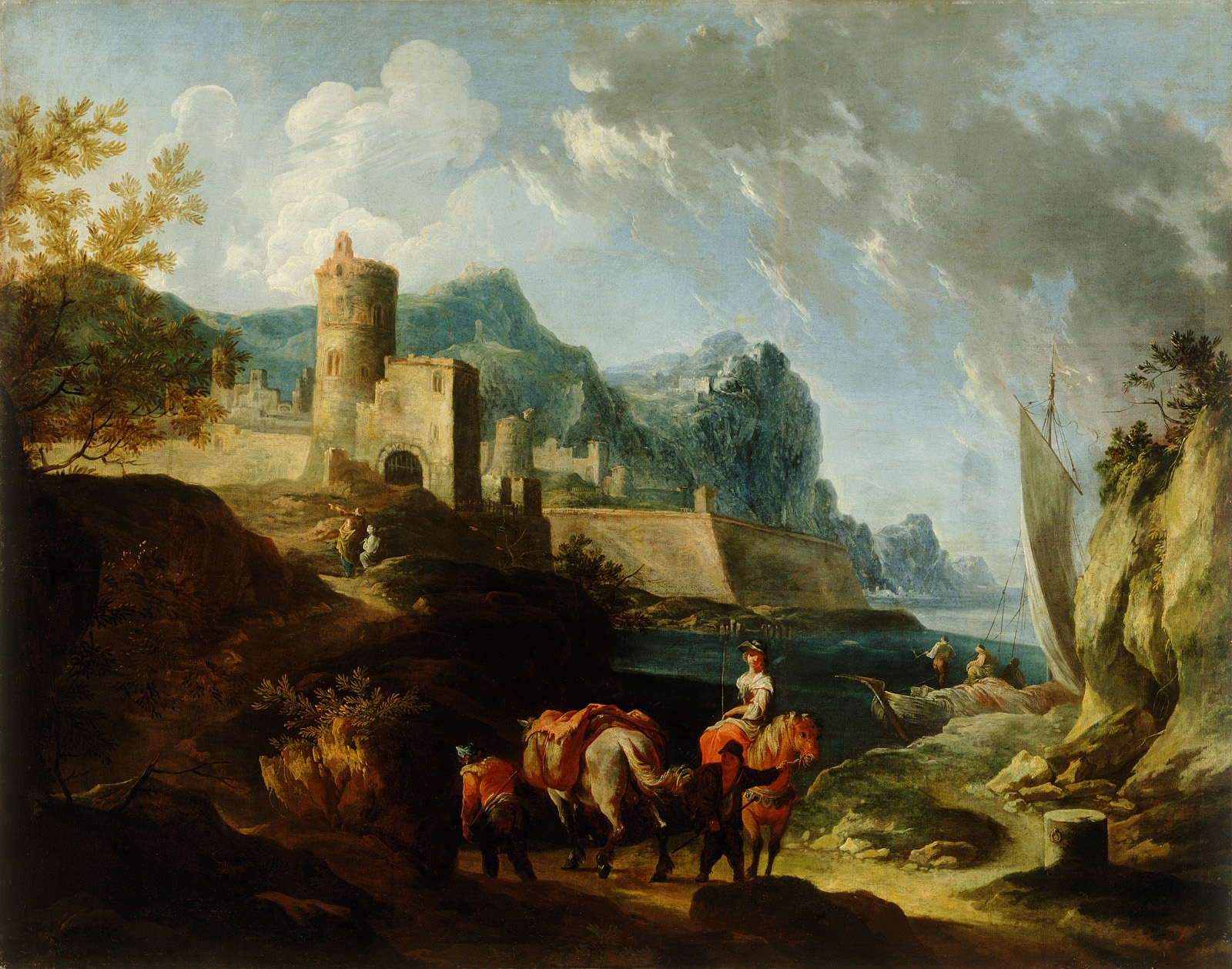
Seacoast with Travelers and a Town

Franz Ignaz Josef Flurer (July or August 1688 – 25 June 1742) was a German painter, best known for his landscapes with figures. Much of his work was done in Austria.

== Biography ==
He trained in Augsburg from 1701 to 1706 with Johann Rieger. Little is known of his next few years, but he apparently spent most of them in Styria. By 1720, he was in the employ of Ignaz Maria Graf Attems (?–1732). His work included painting canvases and frescoes for the Graf's manors at Slovenska Bistrica, Brežice, and Gösting (now part of Graz); work with which he was occupied until 1729. The paintings at Gösting have since been destroyed.

In the early 1730s, he executed frescoes for the casino at Haselsdorf-Tobelbad and the garden pavilion at Schloss Brunnsee in Mureck. He also painted religious works, primarily in Graz. These include a portrait of Saint Giles for the altar in Graz Cathedral. In 1733, he was able to purchase a large home and settle in Graz.

His compositional style was heavily influenced by the works of Annibale Carracci and Pietro da Cortona, and his general style derives from the Venetian painters Marco Ricci and Luca Carlevaris. Certain resemblances to the works of Gaspard Dughet and Pieter Mulier have also been pointed out. Although Dughet and Mulier were French and Dutch, respectively, they spent most of their careers in Italy, which suggests that Flurer spent some time there as well, most likely after studying with Rieger.
