= Roman Sebastian Zängerle =

Prince-Bishop of Seckau, Austria

Roman Sebastian Zängerle O.S.B.
- Prince-Bishop of Seckau
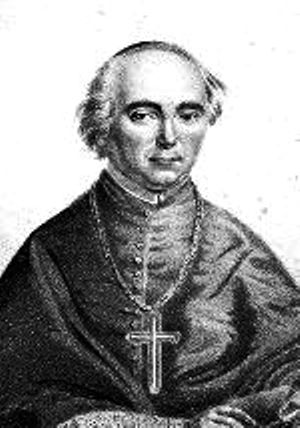
- Roman Sebastian Zängerle, contemporary lithograph
- Church: Catholic Church
- Diocese: Diocese of Seckau
- In office: 10 September 1824 – 27 April 1848
- Predecessor: Simon Melchior de Petris
- Successor: Joseph Othmar von Rauscher

Orders
- Ordination: 21 December 1793
- Consecration: 12 September 1824 by Augustin Johann Joseph Gruber

Personal details
- Born: 20 January 1771 Oberkirchberg, County of Kirchberg and Weissenhorn, Swabian Circle, Holy Roman Empire
- Died: 27 April 1848 (aged 77)

Roman Sebastian Zängerle (20 January 1771, Oberkirchberg – 17 April 1848 at Seckau) was Prince-Bishop of Seckau.

== Biography ==
After studying with the Benedictines at Wiblingen Abbey, Zängerle became a novice there in 1788, took his vows on 5 February 1792, and was ordained priest on 21 December 1793.

From 1794–95 he studied Semitic languages at the monastery of Zwiefalten, and then taught scripture at Wiblingen 1796–99, at Mehrerau 1799-1801, again at Wiblingen 1801–03, at the Benedictine University of Salzburg 1803–07, at the University of Cracow 1807–09, at the University of Prague 1811–13, and at the University of Vienna 1813–24.

In 1824, fifteen years after the suppression of his monastery, when there was no further hope of its restoration, he obtained dispensation from his religious vows in order to accept a canonry at Vienna. On 24 April 1824, he became Prince-Bishop of Seckau and administrator of the diocese of Leoben. These two dioceses, with a population of 800,000, had been without a bishop for twelve years, during which time the government had free scope to infuse Josephinistic ideas into the clergy and laity. The monasteries, almost without exception, had relaxed in discipline; the clergy, both secular and regular, were for the most part worldly-minded and exceedingly lax as pastors of the faithful. Despite governmental opposition, Zängerle inaugurated a thorough religious renovation in both dioceses, reformed the existing monasteries, introduced the Redemptorists, Jesuits, Carmelites and Vincentian Sisters, founded the School Sisters of the Third Order (1843), erected a boys' seminary for both dioceses at Leoben, thoroughly renovated the diocesan seminary religiously and educationally, introduced annual retreats for the clergy, and in many other ways provided for the welfare of both dioceses.

He died in Seckau in 1848.
