= Wilhelm Krautwaschl =

Austrian bishop (born 1963)

- Bishop of Graz-Seckau
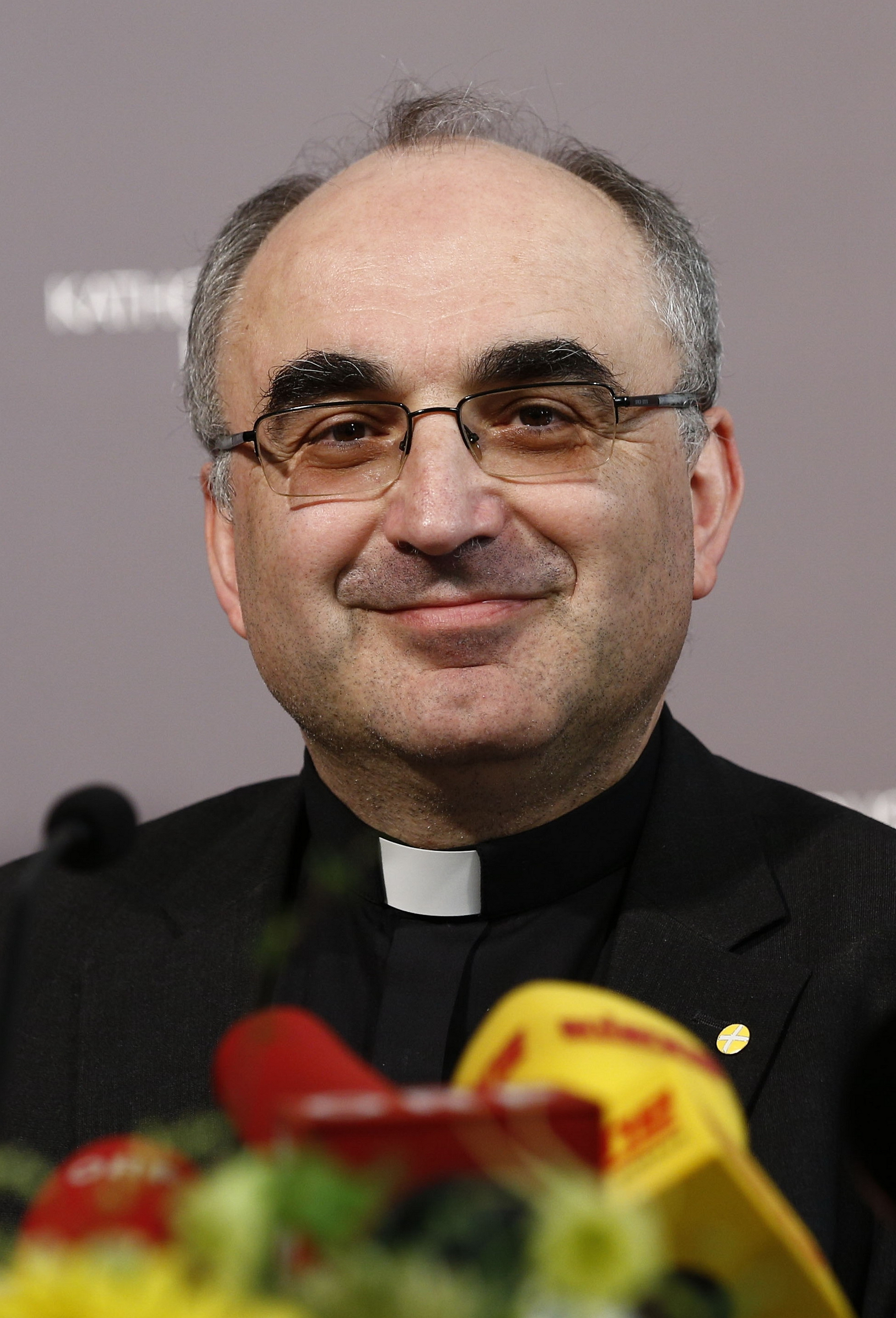
- Church: Catholic Church
- Diocese: Diocese of Graz-Seckau
- Appointed: 16 April 2015
- Predecessor: Egon Kapellari

Orders
- Ordination: 1 July 1990 by Johann Weber
- Consecration: 14 June 2015 by Franz Lackner

Personal details
- Born: 5 March 1963 (age 63) Gleisdorf, Austria
- Coat of arms

Wilhelm Krautwaschl (born 5 March 1963) is an Austrian Roman Catholic prelate. He has served as the bishop of Graz-Seckau since 2015.

== Biography ==
Wilhelm Krautwaschl was born on 5 March 1963 in Gleisdorf (Styria). He studied philosophy and theology at the University of Graz from 1981 to 1990, earning a doctorate in theology. He was ordained a priest of the Diocese of Graz-Seckau on 7 July 1990.

From 1990 to 1999, he fulfilled a series of assignments as assistant parish priest in Hartberg, Knittelfeld, Lind-Maβweg, Schönberg ob Knittelfeld, and St. Margarethen Knittelfeld, Rachau. He became parish priest in Bruck an der Muhr, St. Dionysen-Oberaich, and Pernegg in 1999.

From 2002 to 2006, he was dean of the Deanery of Bruck an der Mur. He then became rector of the Episcopal Seminary of Graz, as well as head of Vocations Ministry and the Support of Priests. He was also a judge at the Diocesan Court.

Pope Francis named him bishop of Graz-Seckau on 16 April 2015. He received his episcopal consecration from Franz Lackner, Archbishop of Salzburg, on 14 June 2015.
