= Diocese of Graz-Seckau =

Catholic ecclesiastical territory

Coordinates: 47°04′19″N 15°26′32″E

Diocese of Graz-Seckau Dioecesis Seccoviensis (Latin) Diözese Graz-Seckau (German)

Catholic
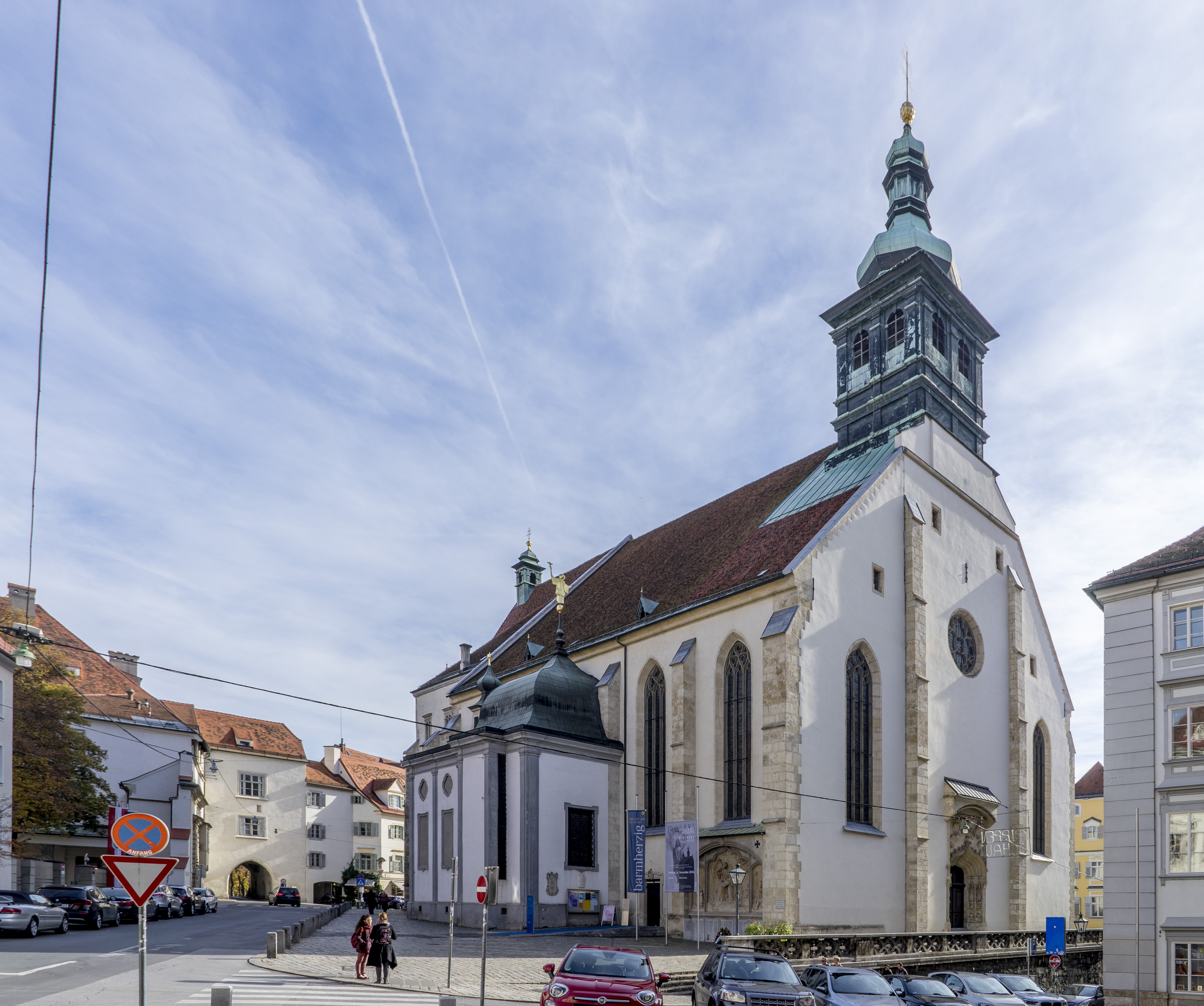
- Graz Cathedral

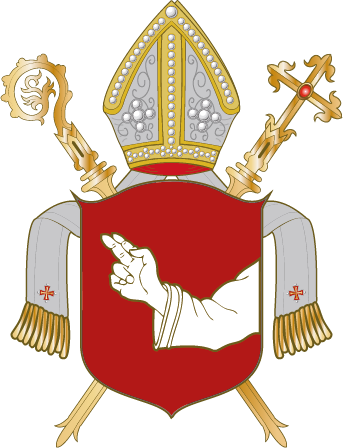
- Coat of arms

Location
- Country: Austria
- Territory: Styria
- Ecclesiastical province: Salzburg
- Metropolitan: Archdiocese of Salzburg

Statistics
- Area: 16,392 km^{2} (6,329 sq mi)
- Population: Total; Catholics: (as of 2019); 1,240,214; 817,000 (65.9%)

Information
- Denomination: Roman Catholic
- Rite: Roman Rite
- Established: June 22, 1218
- Cathedral: Graz Cathedral
- Patron saint: Saint Rupert; Saint Virgil

Current leadership
- Pope: Leo XIV
- Bishop: Wilhelm Krautwaschl
- Metropolitan Archbishop: Franz Lackner
- Bishops emeritus: Egon Kapellari

Map
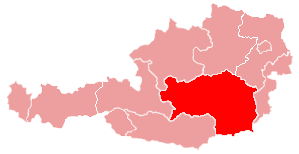
- Location of the Diocese of Graz-Seckau in Austria

Website
- Website of the Diocese

The Diocese of Graz-Seckau (Latin: Dioecesis Seccoviensis, German: Diözese Graz-Seckau) is a Latin Church diocese of the Catholic Church comprising the Austrian state of Styria. It is part of the Ecclesiastical Province of Salzburg.

== History ==
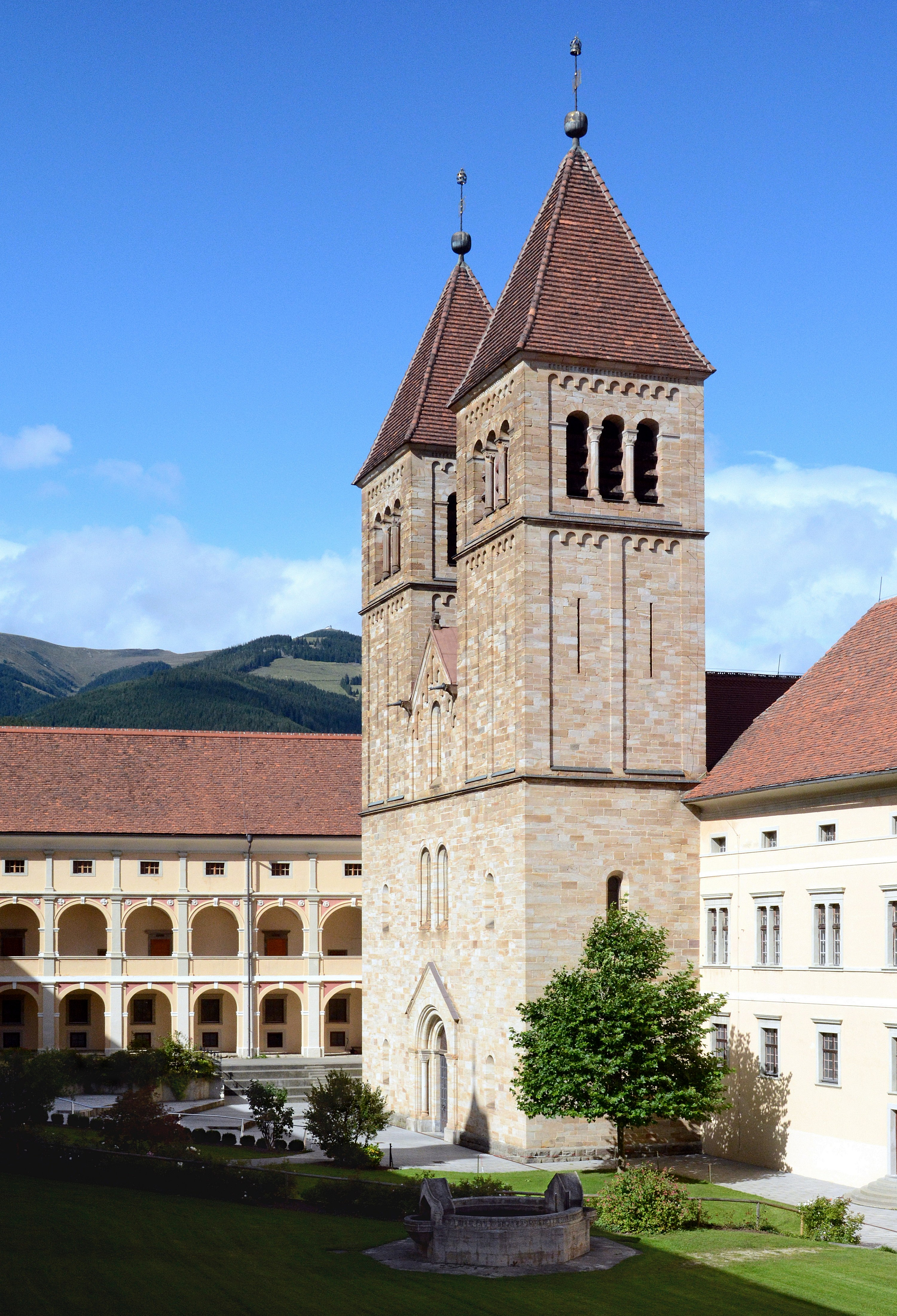
Seckau basilica

The See of Seckau was founded on 22 June 1218, then the third suffragan of the metropolitan diocese of Salzburg after Gurk (1072) and Chiemsee (1215), by Archbishop Eberhard von Regensberg with permission from Pope Honorius III. Emperor Frederick II gave his consent on 26 October 1218; he conferred on the incumbent of the see the dignity of a Prince of the Roman Empire, though with no secular power. A fourth suffragan diocese, Lavant, followed in 1228.

The first bishop was Provost Karl von Friesach (1218–1230) who had his see at Seckau Abbey in Upper Styria; his diocese only comprised 13 parishes. Most of the time, the Seckau bishops resided at Seggau Castle near Leibnitz and at Graz, they also served as vicars in the Duchy of Styria. Under the Habsburg emperor Joseph II, the diocese was reorganised and its territory was enlarged. However, the original intention of the emperor to establish an archbishopric at Graz, the capital of Styria, was frustrated by the opposition of the Archbishop of Salzburg.

In 1786, the episcopal see was finally transferred from Seckau to Graz Cathedral, though the name of the diocese remained unchanged until 1963. A new cathedral chapter was installed, composed at first of three dignitaries and four canons. The see included thenceforth the Salzburg territory in Styria; at the same time, the short-lived Diocese of Leoben was created in Upper Styria. After the death of the first and only Bishop of Leoben, the administration of this see was again entrusted in 1808 to the Bishops of Seckau at Graz. The limits of Seckau are due to a regulation of 1859, incorporating the Diocese of Leoben into that of Seckau, while Seckau ceded Lower Styria with its (chiefly) Slovene-speaking population to the Diocese of Lavant with its see at Maribor (Marburg).

== Special churches ==
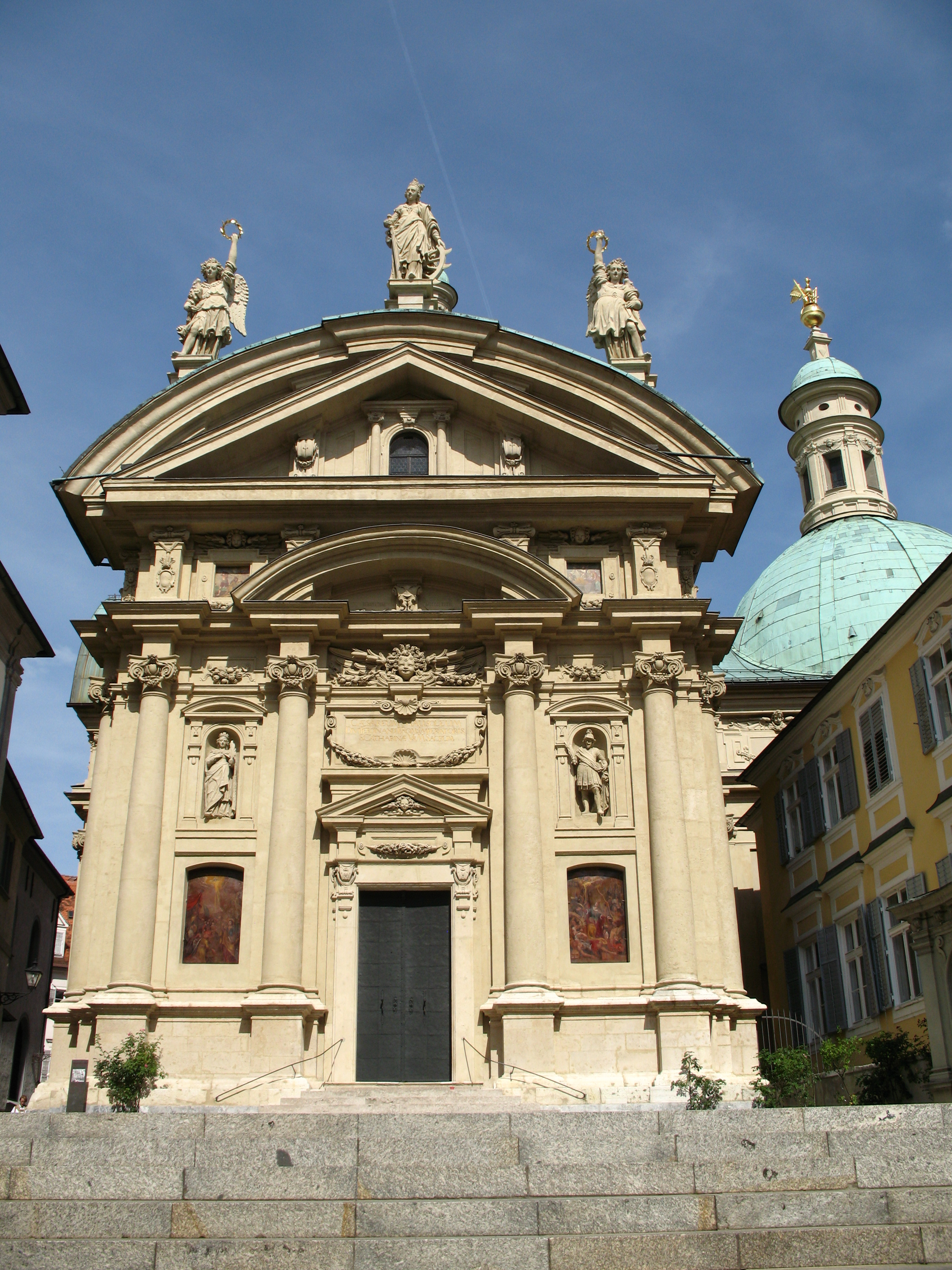
St Catherine's Church and Mausoleum, Graz

- Church of Göss Abbey, briefly the cathedral of the Diocese of Leoben (Dom Sankt Maria und Andreas): parish church; former abbey church and former cathedral
- Mariazell Basilica (Basilika Mariä Geburt) in Mariazell: minor basilica and national shrine
- Mariatrost Basilica (Basilika Maria Trost) in Mariatrost: minor basilica
- Church of Rein Abbey: abbey church and minor basilica

The diocese also operates a religious museum (Diözesanmuseum), housed in the former Jesuit University building in the Graz Old Town across from the cathedral and the Church of St. Catherine of Alexandria with the mausoleum of Emperor Ferdinand II.

== List of bishops ==
=== Bishops of Seckau ===
- Karl I von Friesach (1218–1230)
- Heinrich I (1231–1243)
- Ulrich I (1243–1268)
- Wernhard von Marsbach (1268–1283)
- Leopold I (1283–1291)
- Heinrich II (1292–1297)
- Ulrich II von Paldau (1297–1308)
- Friedrich I von Mitterkirchen (1308–1317)
- Wocho (1317–1334)
- Heinrich III von Burghausen (1334–1337)
- Rudmar von Hader (1337–1355)
- Ulrich III von Weißenegg (1355–1372)
- Augustin Münzmeister von Breisach (1372–1380)
- Johann I von Neuberg (1380–1399, anti-bishop from 1372)
- Friedrich II von Perneck (1399–1414)
- Sigmar von Holleneck (1414–1417)
- Ulrich IV von Albeck (1417–1431)
- Konrad von Reisberg (1431–1443)
- Georg I Lembucher (1443–1446)
- Friedrich III Gren (1446–1452)
- Georg II Überacker (1452–1477)
- Christoph I von Trautmannsdorf (1477–1480)
- Johann II Serlinger (1480–1481)
- Matthias Scheit (1482–1502)
- Christoph II von Zach (1502–1508)
- Matthias Scheit (1508–1512)
- Christoph III Rauber (1512–1530) (apostolic administrator), coadjutor since 1508
- Georg III von Tessing (1536–1541)
- Christoph IV von Lamberg (1541–1546), coadjutor since 1537
- Johann III von Malentein (1546–1550)
- Philipp Renner (1551–1553) (apostolic administrator)
- Petrus Percic (1553–1572)
- Georg IV Agricola (1572–1584)
- Sigmund von Arzt (1584)
- Martin Brenner (bishop) (1585–1615)
- Jakob I Eberlein (1615–1633)
- Johannes Markus Freiherr von Aldringen (22 August 1633 – 2 February 1664)
- Maximilian Gandolph von Künburg (7 February 1665 – 30 July 1668), appointed Archbishop of Salzburg
- Maximilian Gandolph von Künburg (apostolic administrator 12 November 1668 – 3 May 1687)
- Wenzel Wilhelm Reichsgraf von Hofkirchen (20 February 1670 – 6 November 1679)
- Johann Ernst Reichsgraf von Thun (29 December 1679 – 24 November 1687), appointed Archbishop of Salzburg
- Rudolf Joseph Reichsgraf von Thun (16 February 1690 – 20 May 1702)
- Franz Anton Adolph Graf von Wagensperg (1702 – 18 February 1712)
- Joseph Dominicus von Lamberg (13 March 1712 – 15 March 1723), appointed Bishop of Passau
- Karl Joseph Reichsgraf von Kuenburg (21 April 1723 – 4 October 1723)
- Leopold Anton Eleutherius Reichsfreiherr von Firmian (1724 – 22 December 1727), appointed Archbishop of Salzburg
- Jakob Ernst Graf von Liechtenstein-Kastelkorn (17 January 1728 – 26 January 1739), appointed Bishop of Olomouc
- Leopold Ernest von Firmian (13 February 1739 – 1 September 1763), appointed Bishop of Passau
- Joseph Philipp Franz Reichsgraf von Spaur (1 October 1763 – 20 March 1780)

=== Bishops of Graz-Seckau ===
- Joseph Adam Graf Arco (1 January 1780 – 3 June 1802), became bishop of Graz-Seckau in 1786
- Johann Friedrich Graf von Waldenstein-Wartenberg (21 July 1802 – 15 April 1812)
- Simon Melchior de Petris (19 April 1812 – 1 August 1823), was vicar apostolic; was never consecrated bishop
- Roman Sebastian Zängerle (18 May 1824 – 27 April 1848)
- Joseph Othmar von Rauscher (29 January 1849 – 27 June 1853), appointed Archbishop of Vienna
- Ottokar Maria Graf von Attems (10 September 1853 – 12 April 1867)
- Johann Baptist Zwerger (14 August 1867 – 14 August 1893)
- Leopold Schuster (20 October 1893 – 18 March 1927)
- Ferdinand Stanislaus Pawlikowski (26 April 1927 – 7 December 1953)
- Josef Schoiswohl (18 January 1954 – 22 April 1963)
- Bishops of Graz-Seckau:
- Josef Schoiswohl (22 April 1963 – 1 January 1969)
- Johann Weber (10 June 1969 – 14 March 2001)
- Egon Kapellari (14 March 2001 – 28 January 2015)
- Wilhelm Krautwaschl (16 April 2015 –)

== See also ==
- Roman Catholicism in Austria
- Parish church of Kainach bei Voitsberg

== Sources ==
- GCatholic.org
- Catholic Hierarchy
- Diocese website
- Diocesan Museum Graz
