= Diocese of Leoben =

Catholic diocese in Austria (1785–1959)

Map of Austria showing the Diocese of Leoben
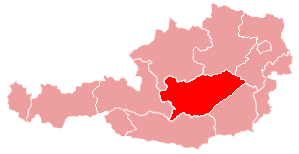

The Diocese of Leoben was an Austrian Roman Catholic diocese which covered parts of Styria previously in the Archdiocese of Salzburg. It was founded on 28 January 1785 but after the death in 1800 of its first and only bishop, its incorporation into the Diocese of Seckau was ordered in 1804 by Holy Roman Emperor Francis II. Although the bishops of Seckau administered it from 1808, Papal consent to the unification was not given until 1859.

== History ==
The Diocese of Leoben was created at the wish of Holy Roman Emperor Joseph II, who was also Archduke of Austria, from territory belonging to the Archdiocese of Salzburg. Pope Pius VI gave his consent to its creation on 17 March 1786.

The first and only Bishop of Leoben was Alexander Franz Joseph Graf Engl von und zu Wagrain, appointed on 20 Nov 1783 and ordained bishop on 30 Apr 1786. The episcopal seat was in the church of the former Göss Abbey near Leoben, where a cathedral chapter was set up.

The diocesan territory comprised the districts of Bruck an der Mur and Judenburg together with the area round Aussee, and contained 157 parishes.

After the death of Bishop Engl on 22 February 1800, the diocese was administered by the chapter until 1808, and thereafter by the bishops of Seckau.

As early as 13 July 1804, the unification of the Diocese of Leoben with the Diocese of Seckau was ordered by Emperor Francis II. The papacy delayed its ratification however, and the unification did not actually take place until 1 September 1859.

== Literature ==
- Tomek, Ernst, 1935-39: Kirchengeschichte Österreichs. Innsbruck-Vienna-Munich: Tyrolia
- Wodka, Josef, 1959: Kirche in Österreich. Wegweiser durch ihre Geschichte. Vienna: Herder
