= Graz Cathedral =

- Dom St. Ägidius
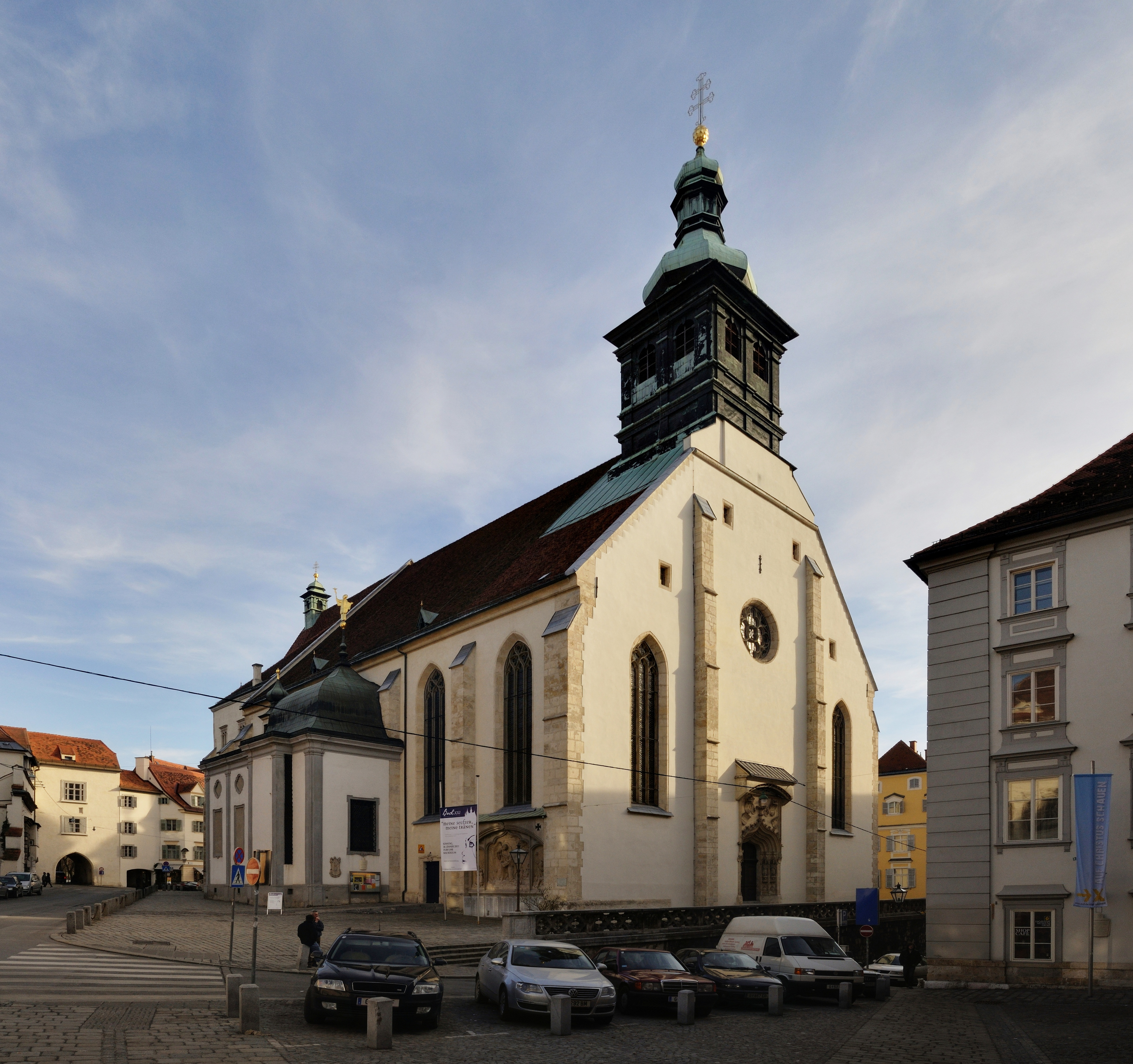
- Graz Cathedral
- 47°04′19.2″N 15°26′31.92″E
- Location: Graz, Styria
- Country: Austria
- Denomination: Roman Catholic

Architecture
- Style: Gothic
- Years built: 1438-62

Administration
- Archdiocese: Salzburg
- Diocese: Graz-Seckau

Graz Cathedral (German: Grazer Dom), also called St. Giles' Cathedral (German: Dom St. Ägidius), is the Roman Catholic cathedral of the Diocese of Graz–Seckau in Graz, Austria. It is dedicated to Saint Giles (Ägidius), the patron saint of Graz, and serves as the seat of the bishop. The church was originally built between 1438 and 1462 as the Hofkirche (court church) of Emperor Frederick III in the Gothic style, and later served as the Jesuit collegiate and university church from 1577 to 1773, during which period it was modified in the Baroque style.

It stands adjacent to the Mausoleum Emperor Ferdinand II. The cathedral’s hall-like design combines Gothic architecture with later Baroque elements, it houses significant artworks such as medieval frescoes and altarpieces, a high Baroque altar (1730–33 by Georg Kraxner) with a painting of St. Giles, and two historic ivory reliquaries (originally Paola Gonzaga’s bridal chests).

== History ==
The site of Graz Cathedral has been sacred since at least the 12th century. A church dedicated to Saint Giles is first documented in a 1174 donation to Seckau Abbey. That early church stood outside the medieval city walls as a fortified chapel, but no part of it survives. In 1438 Emperor Frederick III, who was establishing a new residence (Graz Castle) on the adjacent hill, ordered the complete rebuilding of the church. The new Gothic church (or court church) was largely finished by about 1464, its master builder is thought to have been the Swabian architect Hans Niesenberge. In the following centuries the cathedral was continually updated, a sacristy was added in 1615, and four new side chapels were built between 1617 and 1667 under Habsburg patronage, dedicated to Saints Rochus, Mater Dolorosa, Francis Xavier and the Cross. In 1577 Archduke Charles II of Inner Austria handed the church over to the Jesuits, after that it then served as the Collegiate Church of the Jesuit college and, after the founding of the University of Graz in 1585, as its university church.

In 1786, during Emperor Joseph II’s reforms, the Diocese of Seckau was split and Graz became the episcopal seat of the new Diocese of Graz–Seckau. The former St. Giles parish church was formally elevated to cathedral status, and Joseph Adam Graf von Arco became its first bishop. In the 19th century the old covered passage linking the cathedral to the castle was removed between 1853 and 1854. The cathedral has since undergone various restorations, the interior was renovated in 1962–63, the last major refurbishment before 2017. A comprehensive restoration project began in 2017 with exterior repairs and continued through 2023, including interior renovations, the installation of a new altar, and the rebuilding of the organ, which was consecrated in 2023. Throughout its history, Graz Cathedral has served both as a key religious center for the Diocese of Graz–Seckau and as a parish church, while also reflecting the city's imperial and Catholic heritage.

== Architecture ==
Graz Cathedral is a Gothic hall church (Hallenkirche), a style typical of late medieval Austria. It is constructed of brick and limestone and is oriented along an east–west axis. The exterior is relatively plain, with primarily whitewashed walls, remnants of the original painted stone façades, including fragments of frescoes, are still visible. The church’s floor plan consists of a single broad nave flanked by two narrower side aisles, all covered by a continuous roof. Eight octagonal piers support the high vaults, dividing the interior into three aisles. Several small chapels open off the aisles on each side, and a Baroque gallery (organ loft) spans the rear of the nave. The design is similar to that of mendicant churches, such as those of the Dominicans and Franciscans in Graz, reflecting the building’s 15th-century origins.

The west entrance portal (1456) is the church’s most elaborately decorated external feature, its surrounding sculpture and tracery are characteristic of the ornate late-Gothic style. Although much of the original polychrome façade painting has been lost, one notable fresco remains visible on the south exterior wall, the 1485 Landplagenbild by Thomas von Villach, which depicts the plagues that affected Graz, namely a Turkish attack, locusts, and pestilence, as divine punishment. The cathedral’s roofline features a small clock tower with a ridge turret added in 1653 and a larger octagonal lantern above the crossing. In front of the east wall is a bronze statue of Saint Giles by Erwin Huber (1998). The exterior reflects the simplicity and structural clarity of its original Gothic design, while the interior incorporates later Baroque additions.

== Interior and Artworks ==
The interior of Graz Cathedral combines its Gothic structure with Baroque elements. The central nave is high and well-lit, with plastered walls and stucco ribs on the vaults, while sunlight enters through high lancet windows. Prominent on the south wall are two late medieval frescoes of Saint Christopher (circa 1460–70), one of which depicts Emperor Friedrich III wearing a ducal hat. Baroque furnishings are prominent throughout the space. The high altar (1730–33), designed by Georg Kraxner, is made of richly veined marble, and its main altarpiece (by Franz Ignaz Flurer, 1733) depicts the patron Saint Giles, flanked by statues of the Four Evangelists. The pulpit and choir stalls also from the 18th century are intricately carved with Jesuit symbols. Two Renaissance reliquaries stand on pedestals at the entrance to the chancel arch, these are the ornate ivory-inlaid Brauttruhen (bridal chests) of Paola Gonzaga, repurposed by the Jesuits as reliquaries for martyrs.

Among the cathedral’s most significant medieval artworks is the Gothic crucifixion panel (1457) by Conrad Laib of Salzburg. This oil-on-wood piece, titled Crucifixion in the Crowd (Kreuzigung im Gedräng), was originally part of a high altar, later rediscovered in fragments, and subsequently restored. It is regarded as one of the finest late-Gothic paintings in Austria and has recently been reinstalled in the former Friedrichskapelle (Imperial Oratory) in the south aisle. Another notable relic of the Gothic era is the Landplagenbild (1485), which remains on the exterior wall as a rare example of early fresco painting. The cathedral interior combines its 15th-century architectural structure with a Baroque ensemble of altars, statues, and paintings, reflecting successive periods of devotional art.

== Religious Significance ==
Graz Cathedral is dedicated to Saint Giles (Ägidius), a 7th-century hermit who is venerated as one of the Fourteen Holy Helpers. He is traditionally invoked for protection in times of danger and illness and has been the focus of devotion in Graz since the medieval period. His feast day (September 1) is celebrated by the cathedral parish, and a statuette of the saint is featured on the high altar. In local tradition Giles is recognized as the city’s patron saint, and the church’s annual Kirchweih (dedication festival) has been held on May 1 or on the first Sunday in Advent.

Today, the cathedral serves as a central religious institution in Styria. It is the bishop’s church of the Diocese of Graz–Seckau and also functions as the parish church of Graz-Dom. The building houses the cathedral chapter and hosts major diocesan liturgies, including ordinations and celebrations of principal feast days. In 2020, the new altar installation included the interment of relics of two local martyrs (Johannes Sarkander and Johannes Gapp) in the high altar. Over the centuries, the cathedral’s patronage by rulers and bishops has resulted in the accumulation of numerous votive offerings and liturgical treasures. As an active place of worship, it holds daily Masses, and its liturgical calendar follows the Catholic rites, details of services and music are published in the diocesan liturgy booklet.

== Current Use ==
In recent years Graz Cathedral has undergone extensive renovation to ensure its continued use. A six‑year, €6.5 million restoration project lasting from 2017–2023 addressed both structure and art. The entire nave, choir and side chapels were cleaned and repaired, a new basalt altar and ambo were installed, and a modern LED lighting system now doubles the interior illumination while consuming less energy. The cathedral’s organ built in 1978 was completely rebuilt by Rieger, its 5,300+ pipes were reduced to about 4,200 and updated under new design, and the instrument was consecrated in a November 2023 ceremony. The Bishop of Graz–Seckau expressed hope that the renovated Bischofskirche will inspire the faithful for generations to come.

The cathedral remains open to visitors and pilgrims every day with free admission, except during services. Guided tours are available by arrangement, as announced by the parish. It continues to function as an active parish church with a full schedule of Masses, confessions and sacraments. The church also hosts cultural events, notably organ concerts which includes the annual post-renovation inauguration concert and occasional choral performances. In all its current roles, Graz Cathedral stands as both a historical monument and a vibrant center of faith in the city.

== Gallery ==
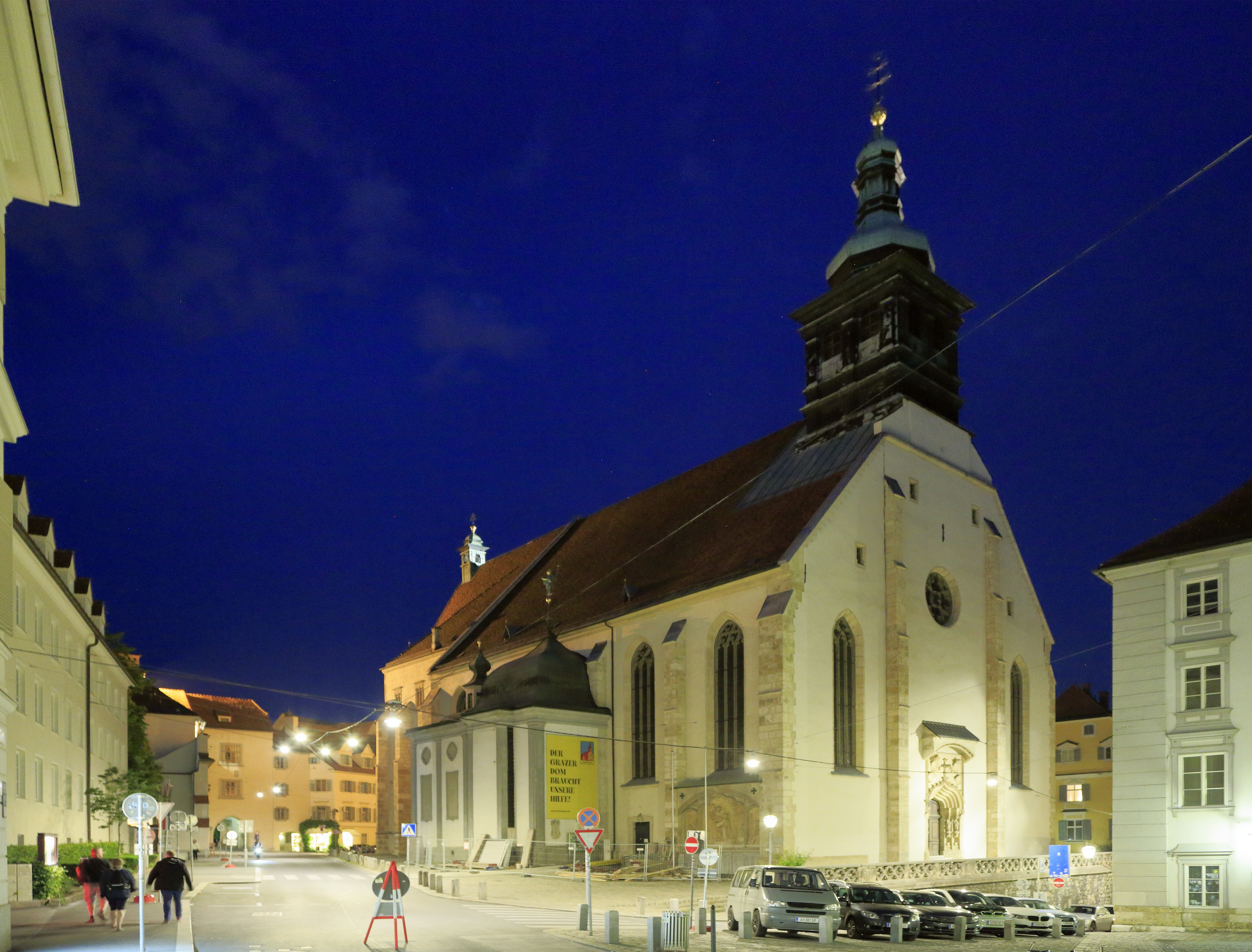
Outside View (Night)

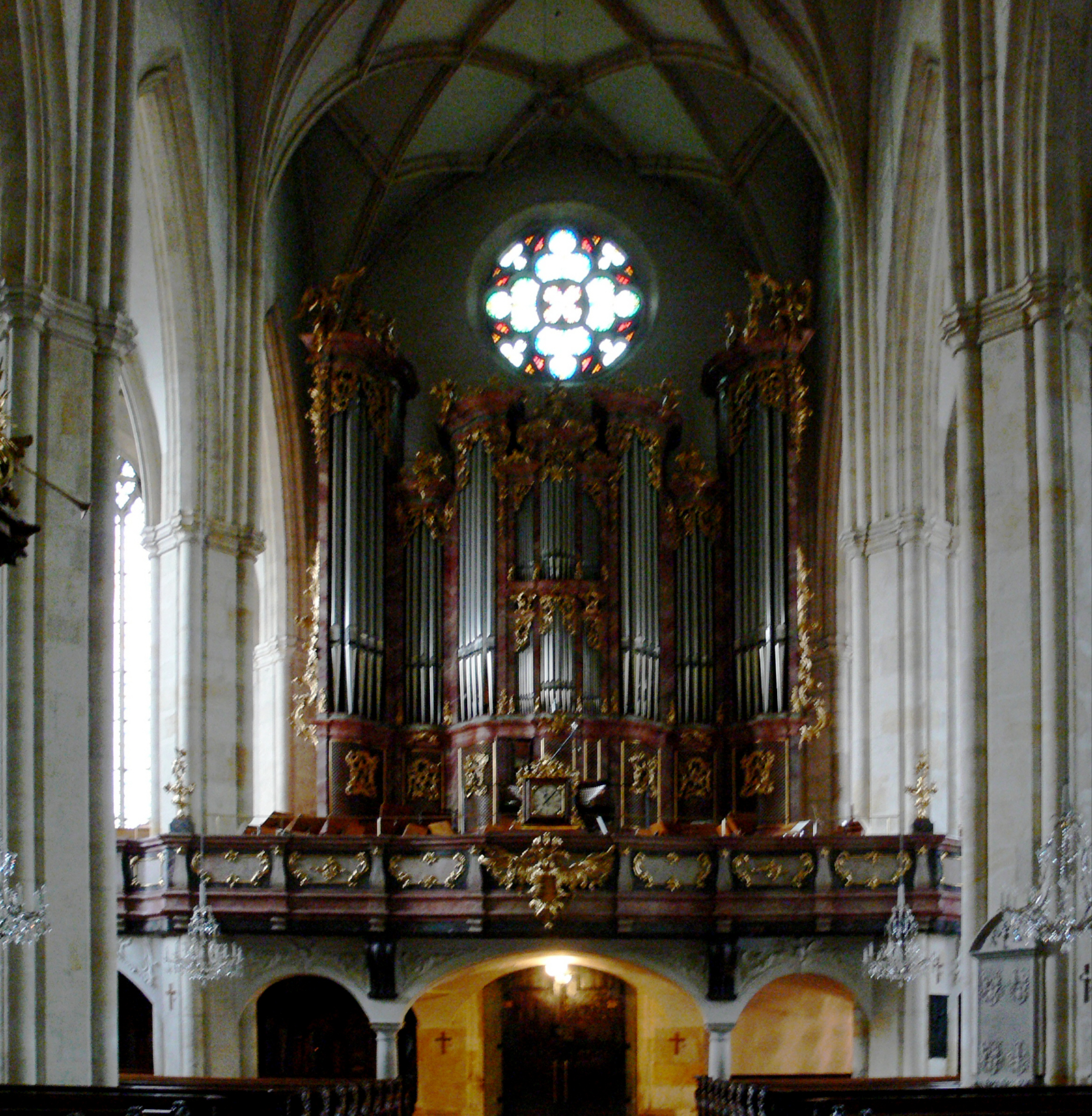
Organ

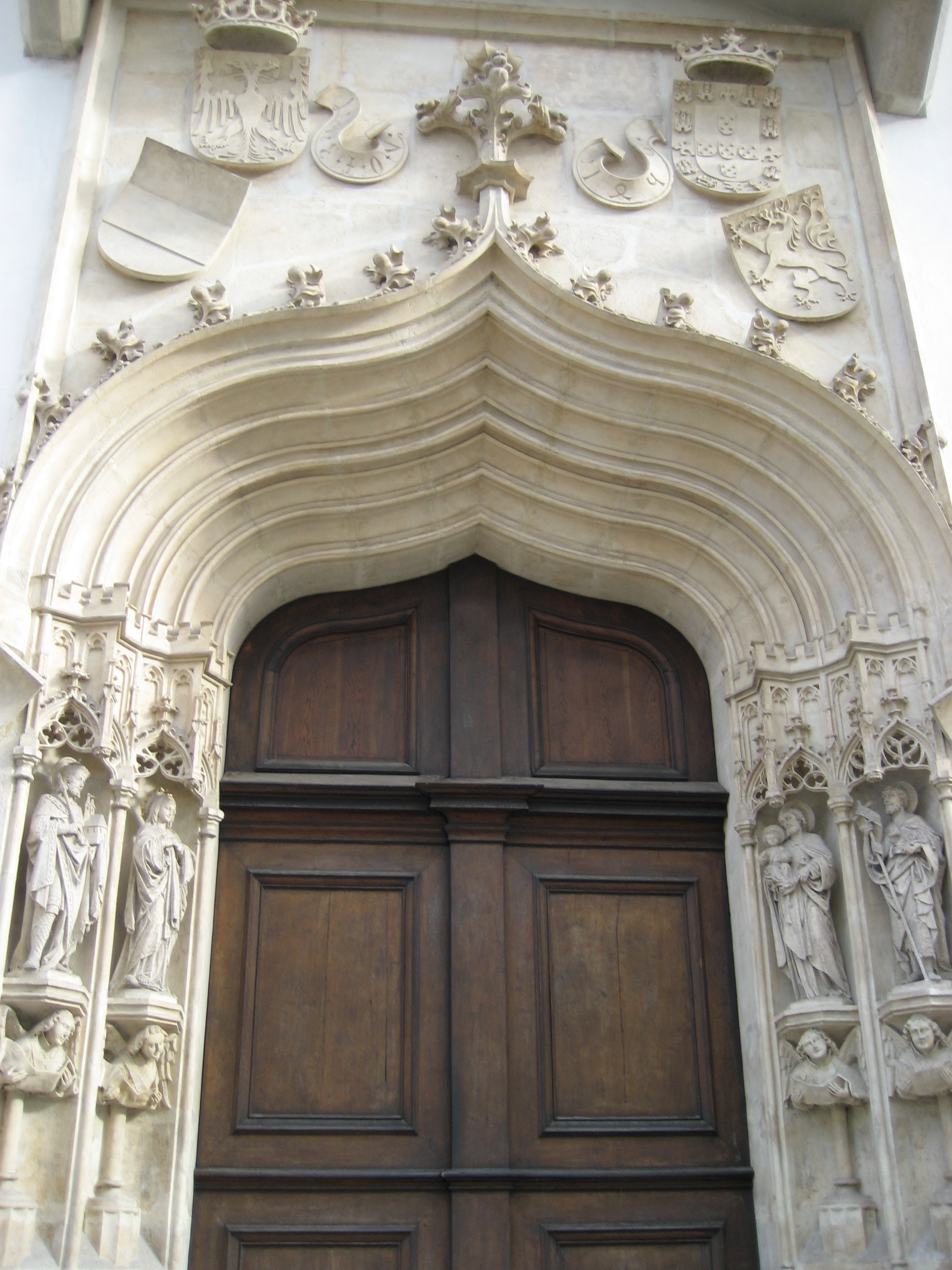
Front Entry

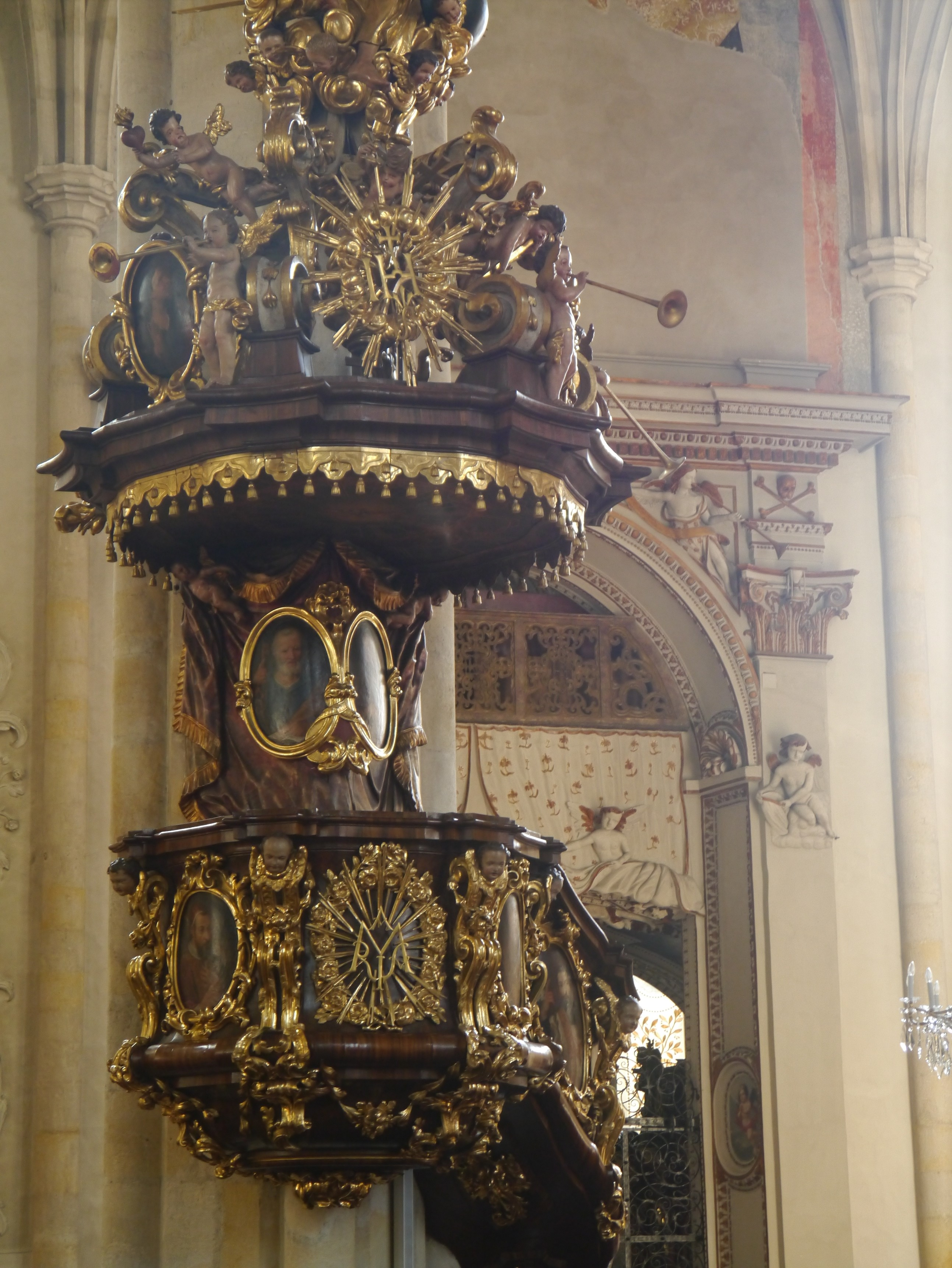
Pulpit

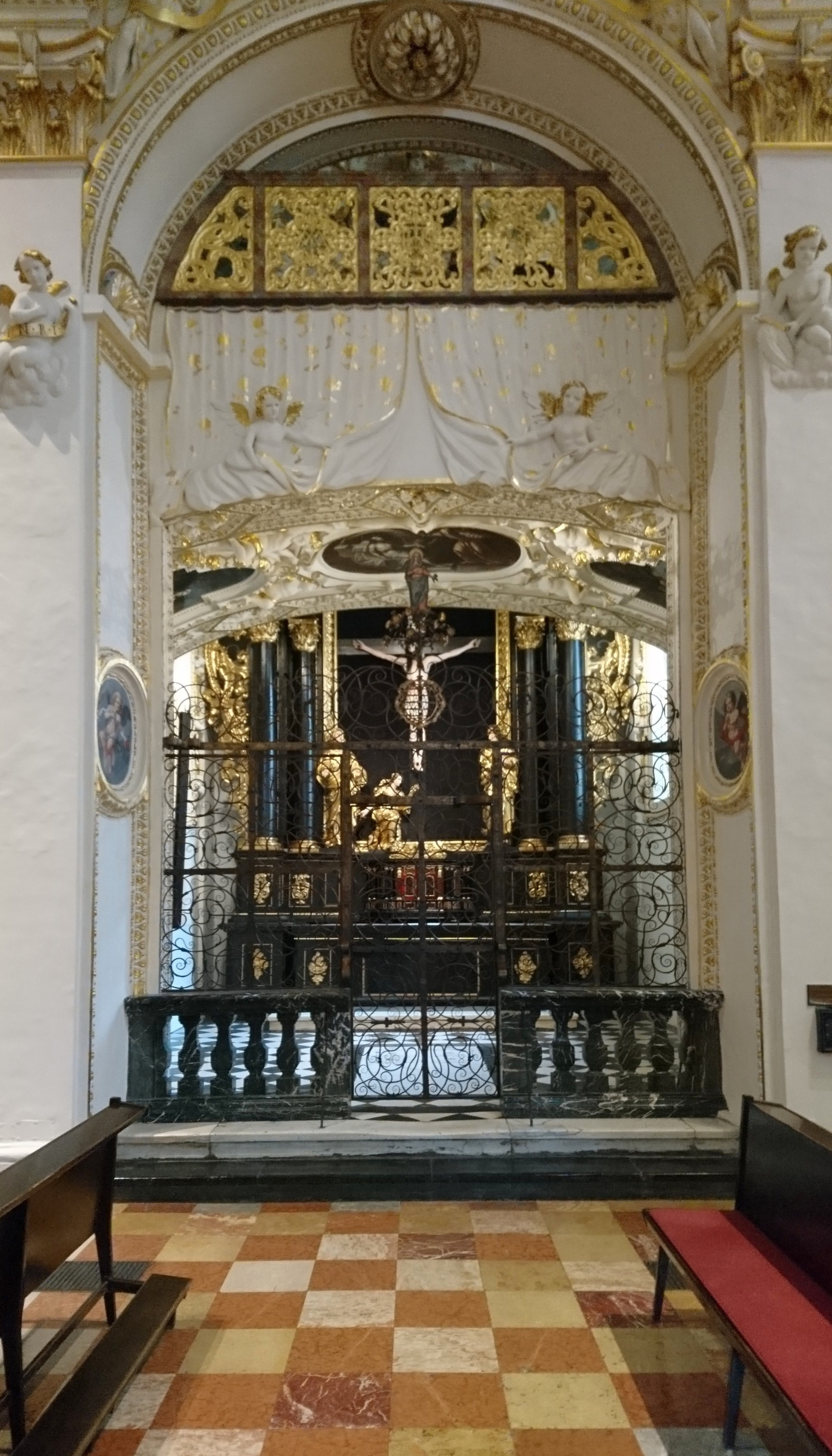
Bishop Crypt

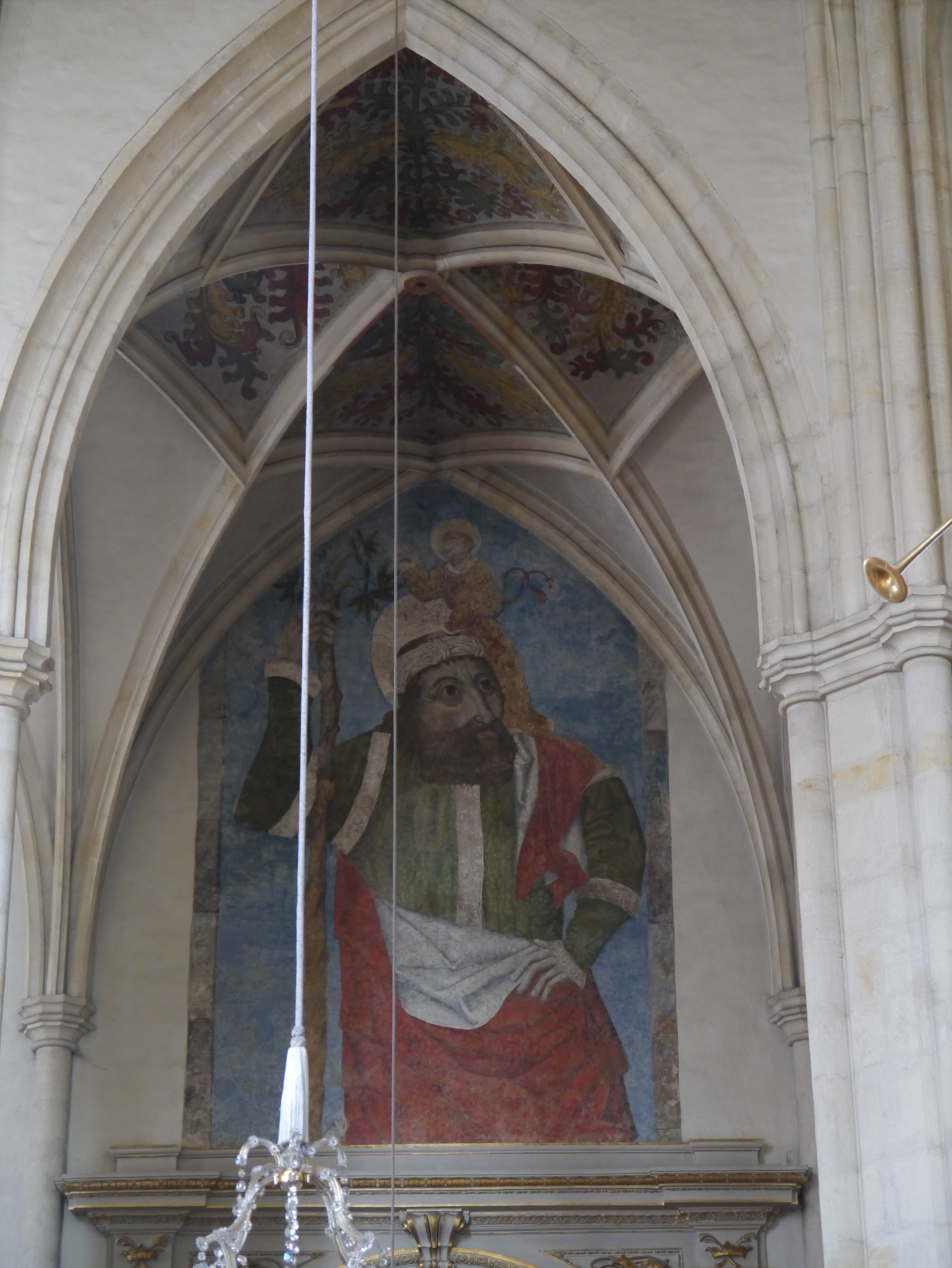
Fresco of St. Ägidius

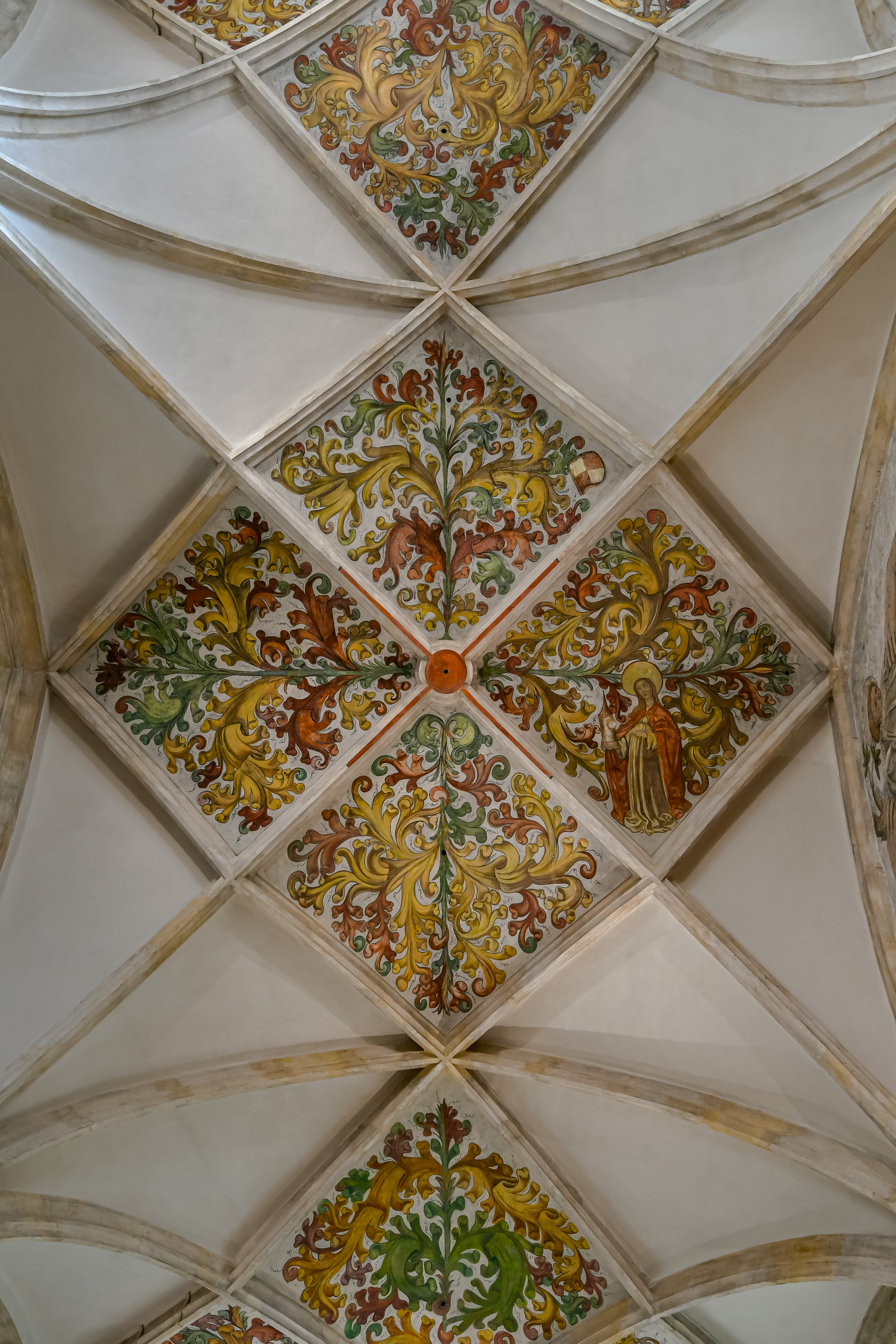
Roof

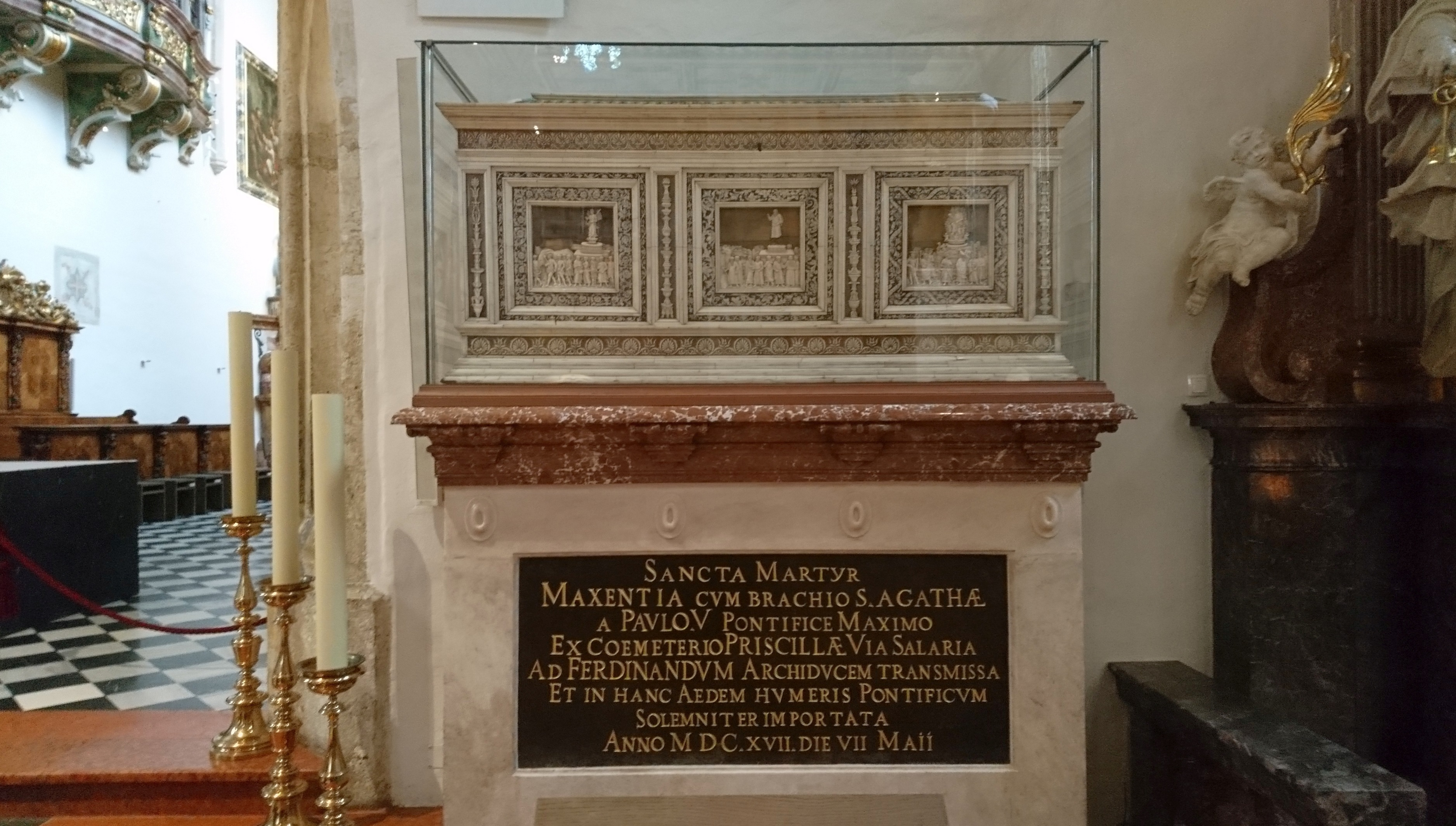
Chasse

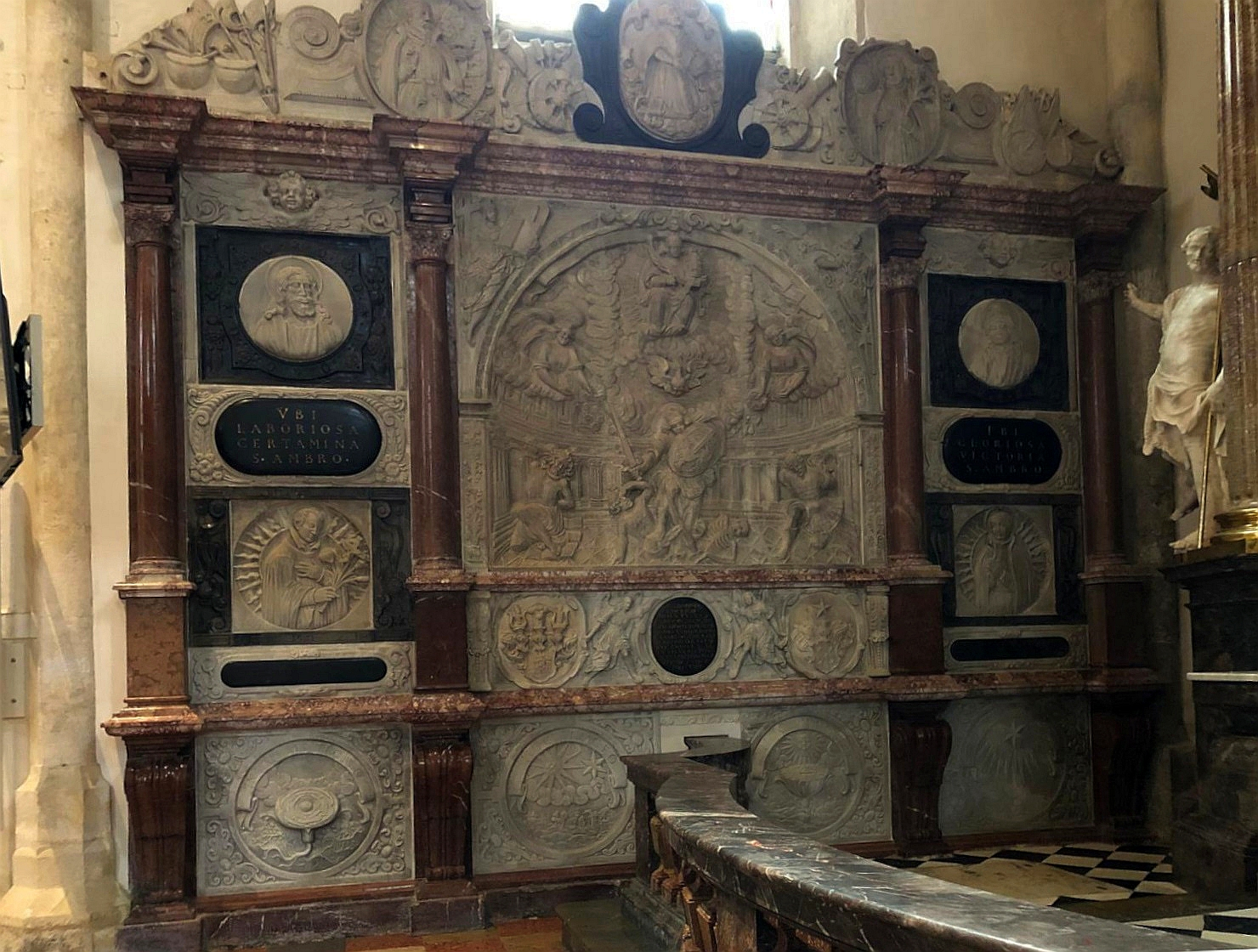
Trauttmansdorff Monument
