= Brahms Museum, Mürzzuschlag =

Brahms Museum
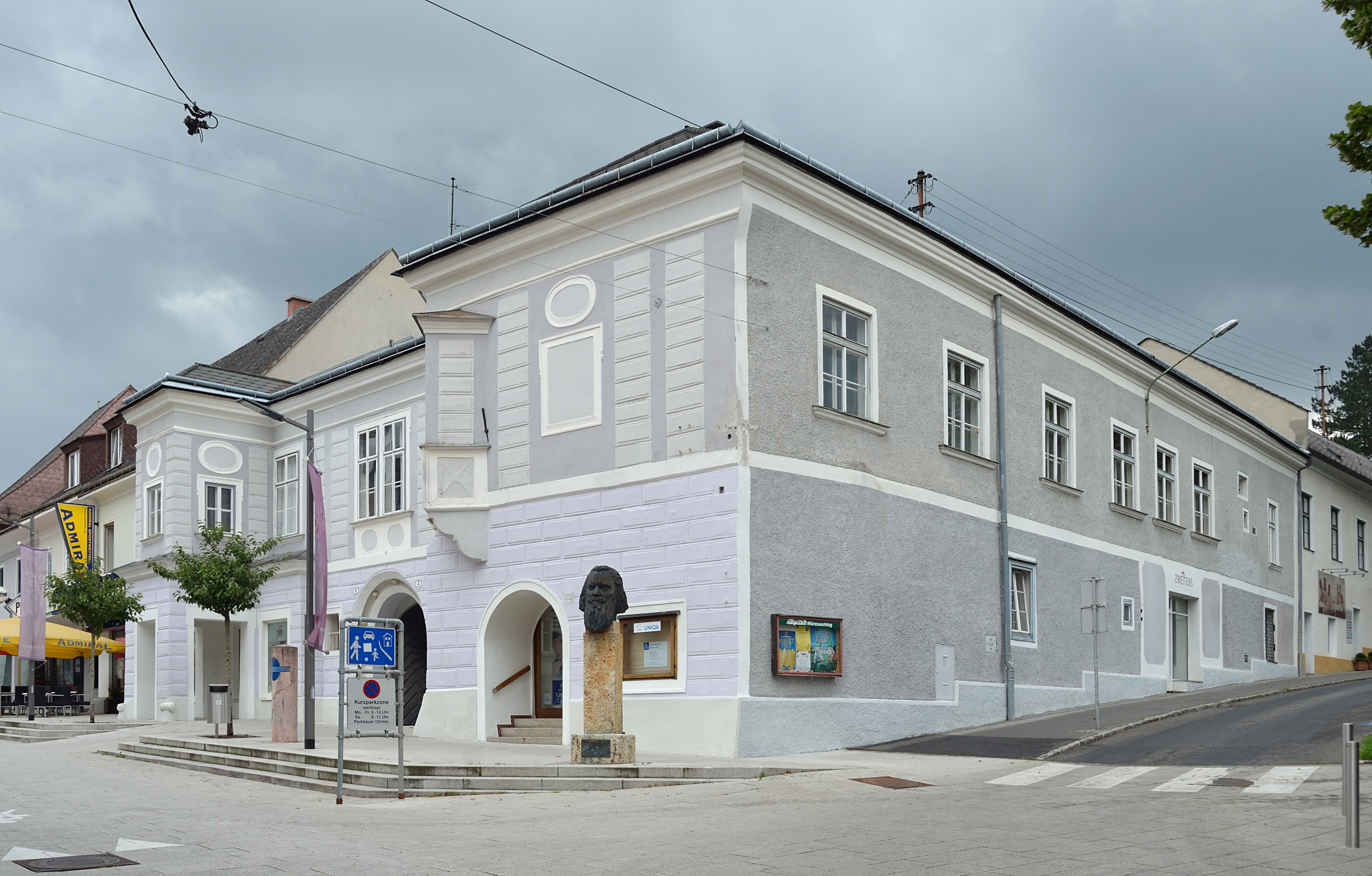

General information
- Address: Wiener Straße 4; 8680 Mürzzuschlag
- Country: Austria
- Coordinates: 47°36′20.2″N 15°40′19.6″E

Website
- www.brahmsmuseum.at

The Brahms Museum, in Mürzzuschlag, in Styria, Austria, is dedicated to the composer Johannes Brahms. He lived here during the summers of 1884 and 1885.

== Description ==
The composer's living quarters were restored in 2015. There is a permanent exhibition about Brahms, particularly his time at Mürzzuschlag. He lived here, over the two years 1884 and 1885, for a total of nine months; during this time he composed his Symphony No. 4, and many songs.

There are items and photographs relating to Brahms, and a grand piano owned by the composer. The exhibition describes the composer's circle of friends, some of whom visited him during his stay.

== See also ==
- List of music museums
- List of museums in Styria
