= Johann Weber (bishop) =

Austrian bishop (1927–2020)

- Bishop of Graz-Seckau
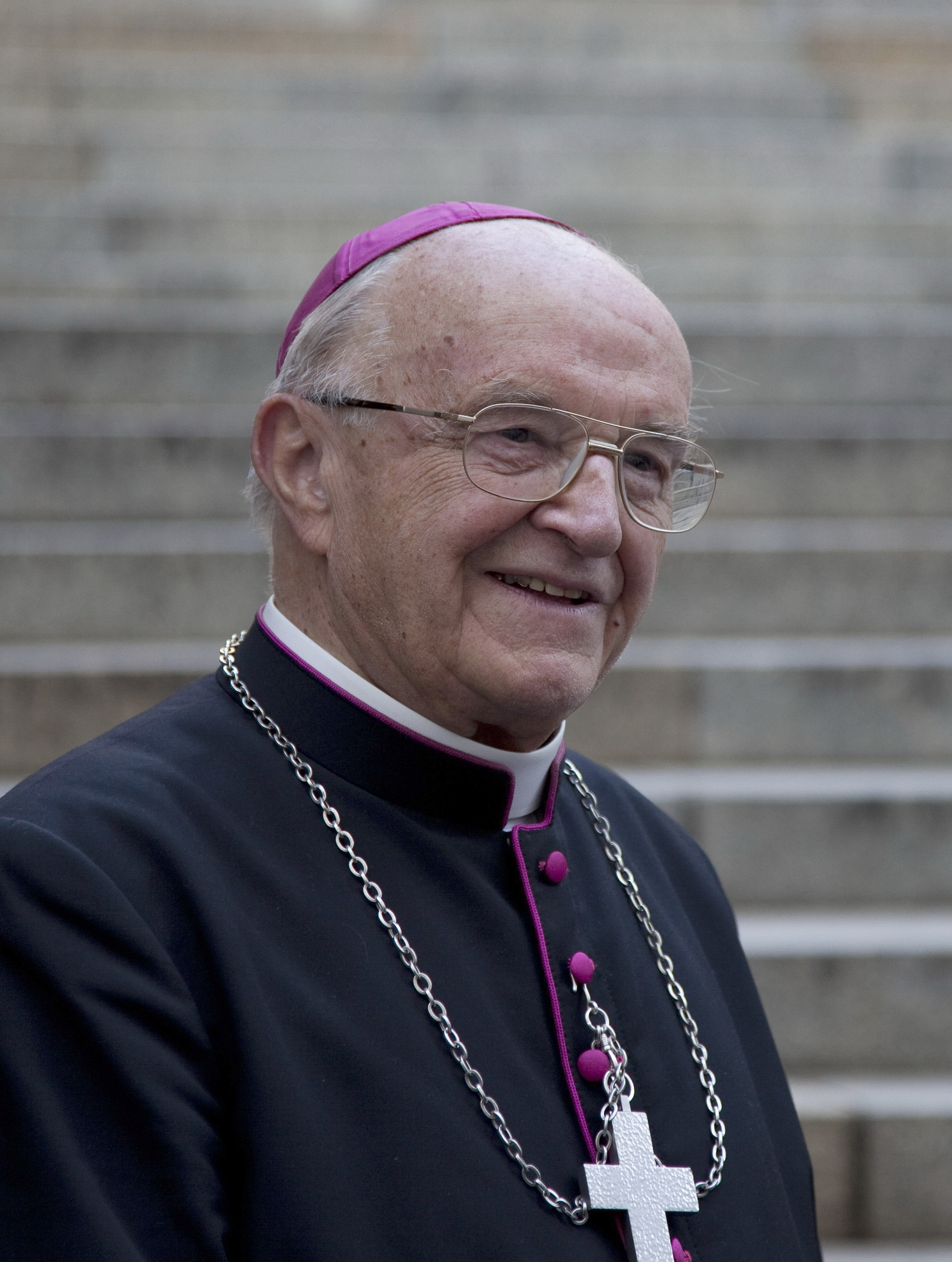
- Johann Weber 2009
- Church: Catholic Church
- Diocese: Diocese of Graz-Seckau
- In office: 10 June 1969 – 14 March 2001
- Predecessor: Josef Schoiswohl
- Successor: Egon Kapellari

Orders
- Ordination: 2 July 1950
- Consecration: 28 September 1969 by Andreas Rohracher

Personal details
- Born: 26 April 1927 Graz, Austria
- Died: 23 May 2020 (aged 93) Graz, Austria

Johann Weber (26 April 1927 – 23 May 2020) was an Austrian Catholic bishop.

Weber was born in Austria and was ordained to the priesthood in 1950. He served as bishop of the Diocese of Graz-Seckau, Austria, from 1969 until 2001. Weber was also Chairman of the Episcopal Conference of Austria between 1995 and 1998.
