= Joseph Othmar von Rauscher =

Austrian Roman Catholic archbishop (1797–1875)

His Eminence Joseph Othmar von Rauscher
- Cardinal, Archbishop of Vienna
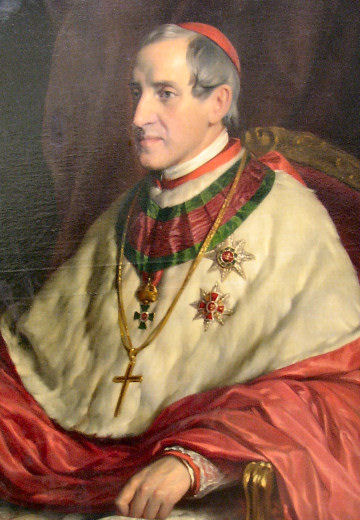
- Church: Roman Catholic
- Archdiocese: Vienna
- Installed: 15 August 1853
- Term ended: 24 November 1875
- Predecessor: Vinzenz Eduard Milde
- Successor: Johann Rudolf Kutschker
- Other post: Cardinal-Priest of Santa Maria della Vittoria
- Previous post: Bishop of Seckau (1849–1853)

Orders
- Ordination: 21 March 1823
- Consecration: 15 April 1849
- Created cardinal: 17 December 1855 by Pius IX
- Rank: Cardinal-Priest

Personal details
- Born: 6 October 1797 Vienna, Austria
- Died: 24 November 1875 (aged 78) Vienna, Austro-Hungarian Empire
- Buried: St. Stephen's Cathedral, Vienna
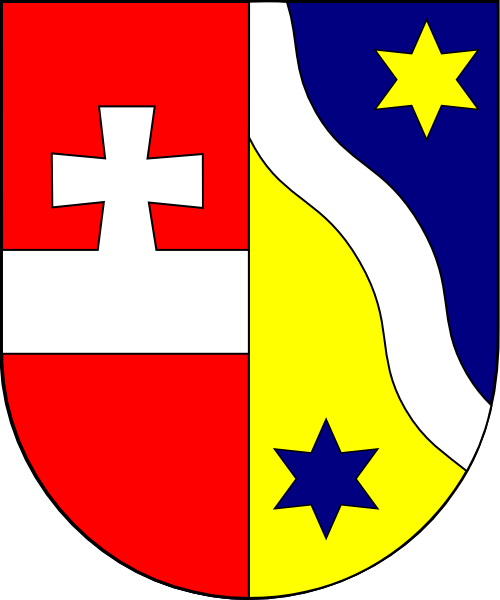
- Coat of arms

Joseph Othmar Ritter von Rauscher (6 October 1797 – 24 November 1875) was an Austrian Prince-Archbishop of Vienna and cardinal.

== Life ==
Joseph Othmar von Rauscher was born in Vienna on 6 October 1797. He received his earlier education at the gymnasium in Vienna, devoting himself chiefly to the study of jurisprudence; he also gave much time to the study of poetry, and many examples of his verses have survived. Later his desire to enter Holy Orders was opposed by his parents, but he finally overcame their objections.

After his ordination he was appointed curate in Hütteldorf, and later professor of church history and canon law at Salzburg, where Friedrich Prince Schwarzenberg, director of the Oriental Academy at Vienna, was among his pupils. In January 1849 Cardinal Schwarzenberg named his former teacher Prince-Bishop of Sekkau, "in recognition of his distinguished qualities, knowledge, and services".

In this capacity Rauscher introduced pastoral conferences, and restored to the Redemptorists their mission houses. He also fostered religious associations, and put an end to the intrigues of the Rongeaner, although important business detained him for the most part in Vienna. He attended the episcopal assembly which inaugurated the ecclesiastical revival in Austria; between 29 April and 20 June 1849, twenty-five bishops and four episcopal proxies held sixty sessions. The last in order of consecration, Rauscher took the most prominent part in the transactions. He laid before the assembly a promemoria, which served as the programme of the business, and drafted five of the seven memorials addressed to the Ministry of the Interior. He also drew up the decrees to serve for the bishops "as the common rule of their aim and activity". The pastoral of the bishops to the clergy was also composed by him. Before the bishops separated, they chose a committee of five members for the settlement of the memorials and the arrangement of all current affairs. As the reporter of this committee, he acted at times as its sole agent.

== Prince-Archbishop of Vienna ==
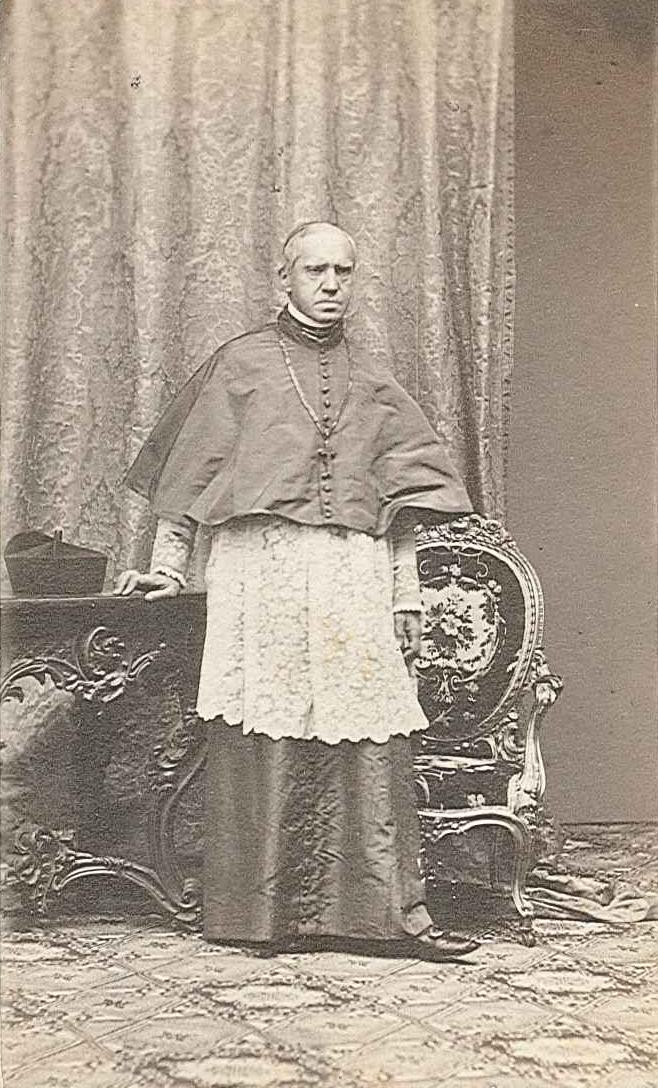
Archbishop Joseph Ritter von Rauscher. Photography, before 1866

Rauscher was the father of the Concordat of 1855. On 14 September 1852, a cabinet order appeared, naming him imperial plenipotentiary for the conclusion of a concordat. The negotiations were long and troublesome; during them Rauscher was named Prince-Archbishop of Vienna, and made his solemn entry into the Cathedral of St. Stephen on 15 August 1853. To promote the Concordat he found it necessary to visit Rome, where he was engaged in the most difficult negotiations for seven months. He was thus able to take part in the solemnities in connexion with the definition of the Immaculate Conception. Finally, on 18 August 1855, the Concordat was signed and on 5 November it was published as a law "applicable throughout the empire". For the homogeneous introduction of the concordat sixty-six bishops assembled in Vienna in 1856. Rauscher was raised to the cardinalate in 1855. By 1 January 1857, ecclesiastical courts, for which Rauscher composed the instructions (Instructio pro indiciis ecclesiasticis), were established in all the episcopal sees. Provincial synods prescribed the special application of the Concordat to the individual dioceses. The decrees of the Viennese Council of 1858, directed by Rauscher and ratified by Rome, served as an important form of clerical life and ecclesiastical activity.

After Austria's wars of 1859–66, he found himself on the defensive, since blame for the defeats was referred to the Concordat. The archbishops and prince-bishops were members of the House of Peers; thus, when the war on the Concordat opened in the Reichstag in 1861 and its revision was demanded, Rauscher with the other episcopal members of the Upper House deliberated concerning an address to the emperor. When the House of Delegates demanded the removal of the religious orders from the penitentiaries, hospitals, and other state institutions, he declared in the House of Peers:

Since 1859 no effort of artificial agitation has been spared to open a campaign against defenceless women, who ask of this earthly life only necessities, and serve their fellow-creatures in privations and discomforts. This unworthy agitation bears the stamp of hatred towards Christianity, but it has likewise in it something cowardly and ignoble, of which even one estranged from Christianity should be ashamed.

In consequence of the events of 1866, a storm against the Concordat and the Church broke out violently, and the Press added to it. When the drafts of the new laws concerning marriage, the schools, and the interconfessional relations, in respect to which points there were many gaps in the Concordat, came up for discussion in the House of Peers, Rauscher delivered a speech on the Concordat, urging harmony between the spiritual and secular powers. When the decrees had been sanctioned, and the new laws had been condemned by the pope, there arose great dissatisfaction and turmoil. Rauscher demanded: "Is it not permissible for a pope to pronounce a law unjust? Every newspaper arrogates to itself the right of stigmatizing the injustice of all laws which do not agree with its partisan views". A little later the pastoral of Bishop Rudigier of Linz was seized, and the bishop himself subsequently condemned to fourteen days' imprisonment with costs; the pastoral was to be suppressed. However, Rauscher immediately obtained from the emperor the annulment of the sentence and of the consequences which it entailed with respect to civil rights and relations.

The Austrian bishops proceeded to the First Vatican Council immediately after the conflict over the Concordat. Rauscher regarded the assembly with the greatest hopes and issued two pastorals dealing with the council on 15 November 1869. Pope Pius IX appointed him to the commission pro recipiendis, which had to investigate all motions submitted. At the first real session of the council (the General Congregation of 28 December) he delivered the first address, and twice spoke against the opportuneness of a universal catechism; the needs and the degrees of culture of the individual peoples were too different. As to the question which finally most strongly stirred the minds of those in and outside the council, that of the infallibility of the pope teaching ex cathedra, Rauscher was the leader of the bishops who combatted the expediency of the definition. His work, "Observationes quædam de infallibilitatis ecclesiæ subjecto", appeared at Naples, and was reprinted at Vienna; the author later explained that it "was especially intended to emphasize the fact that the proposed decision would afford parties hostile to the Church those subterfuges of which they were in need". In the general debate Rauscher, who was ill, had his speech read by Bishop Hefele; it lasted over an hour, and ends characteristically: "But always shall I adore the ways of the Lord", He repeatedly took part in the special debates (8, 9, and 15 June), and at the ballot in the General Congregation of 13 July he voted non placet. However, he did not sign the memorial of the fifty-five bishops of the minority to Pius IX on 17 July, believing he had done all that he should. On 17 July he took leave of the pope, and later, as Archbishop of Vienna, promulgated the doctrinal decrees of the Vatican Council. He protested the suppression of the Papal States, on 20 September 1870. In May 1874 Austrian laws concerning the external legal position of the Catholic Church, the contributions to the religious funds, and the legal recognition of religious societies were issued.

He died in Vienna on 24 November 1875. His body rests in Our Lady's Choir of the Stephanskirche before the steps of the altar. At the wall beneath the Rauscher window is his monument.

== In popular culture ==
In the television series The Empress, he was portrayed by actor August Schmölzer.

== Sources ==
- Rauscher, Hirtenbriefe, Predigten, Anreden (Vienna, 1858)
- ____, Hirtenbriefe, Reden, Zuschriften, new ed., I-II (Vienna, 1875), III (1889)
- Cölestin Wolfsgruber, Cardinal Rauscher. Mit dem Porträte Rauschers u. einem Facsimile seiner Handschrift (Freiburg, 1888)
