= Gösting Castle =

- Styria, Austria
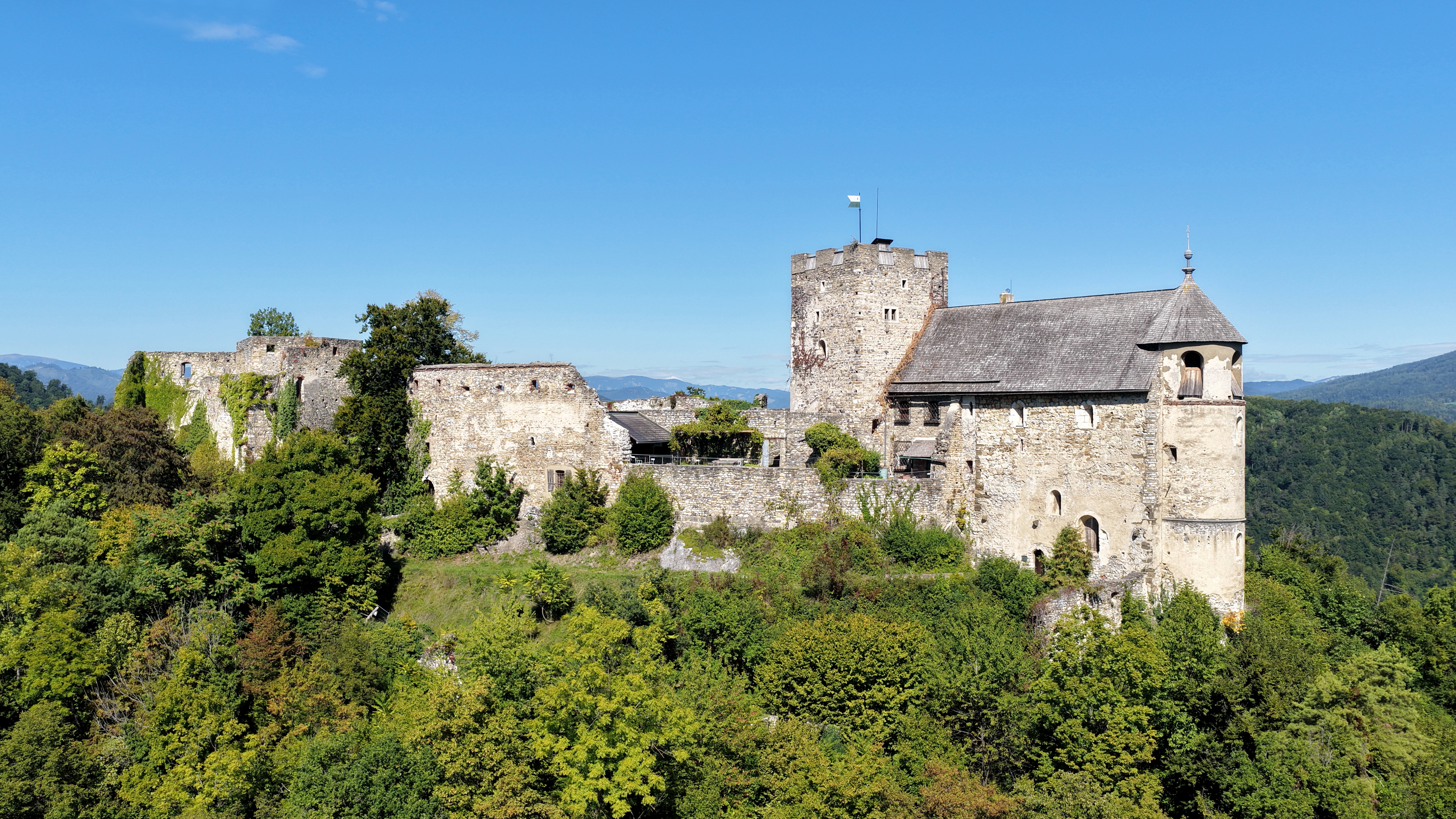
- Southeast view of the Gösting castle ruins

Site information
- Type: Castle
- Owner: Auer Family
- Open to the public: yes
- Condition: ruin

Location
- Coordinates: 47°6′14″N 15°22′52″E

Site history
- Built: before 1042
- Demolished: struck by lightning on 10 July 1723

Gösting Castle (German: Burg Gösting) is a ruined castle in Gösting, the 13th borough in the northwest of the Styrian capital Graz, Austria.

== Location ==
Due to its good strategic location, the castle controlled the narrow Mura valley north of Graz, which opens out into the Graz basin, and therefore the traffic and trade to and from Graz. The castle ruin, which is 200 metres (660 ft) above Graz, is a popular place to visit, since it offers a panoramic view of the Graz basin and the eastern Styrian hill country even today.

== History ==
The castle was built in the 11th century; the first record dates to the year 1042. It continued to be extended until the 15th century. In that century, the castle was expanded to a fortress to provide protection against the Turks and Hungarians. It was part of the signalling fire system, which was supposed to warn the population in case of danger.

In 1707, the castle and domain were acquired by the Counts of Attems. On 10 July 1723 lightning struck the gunpowder magazine and a large part of the castle burnt down. It was not rebuilt, but was replaced as the new residence of the Attems family by the Baroque Schloss Gösting or Neugösting at the foot of the mountain, which was completed in 1728.

Since 1999 the ruin and surrounding forests have been owned by the Auer family, who are bakers. The ruin is maintained by the castle foundation, which was founded in 1925.

== Construction ==
Today only the chapel, the keep, and the remains of some of the walls are still standing. The tower now houses a small museum, and a tavern has been established. The castle can be reached on foot in only 30 minutes from the Schlossplatz in Gösting.

== See also ==
- List of castles in Austria
