= Brahms House (Baden-Baden) =

German music museum

- Brahms-Haus
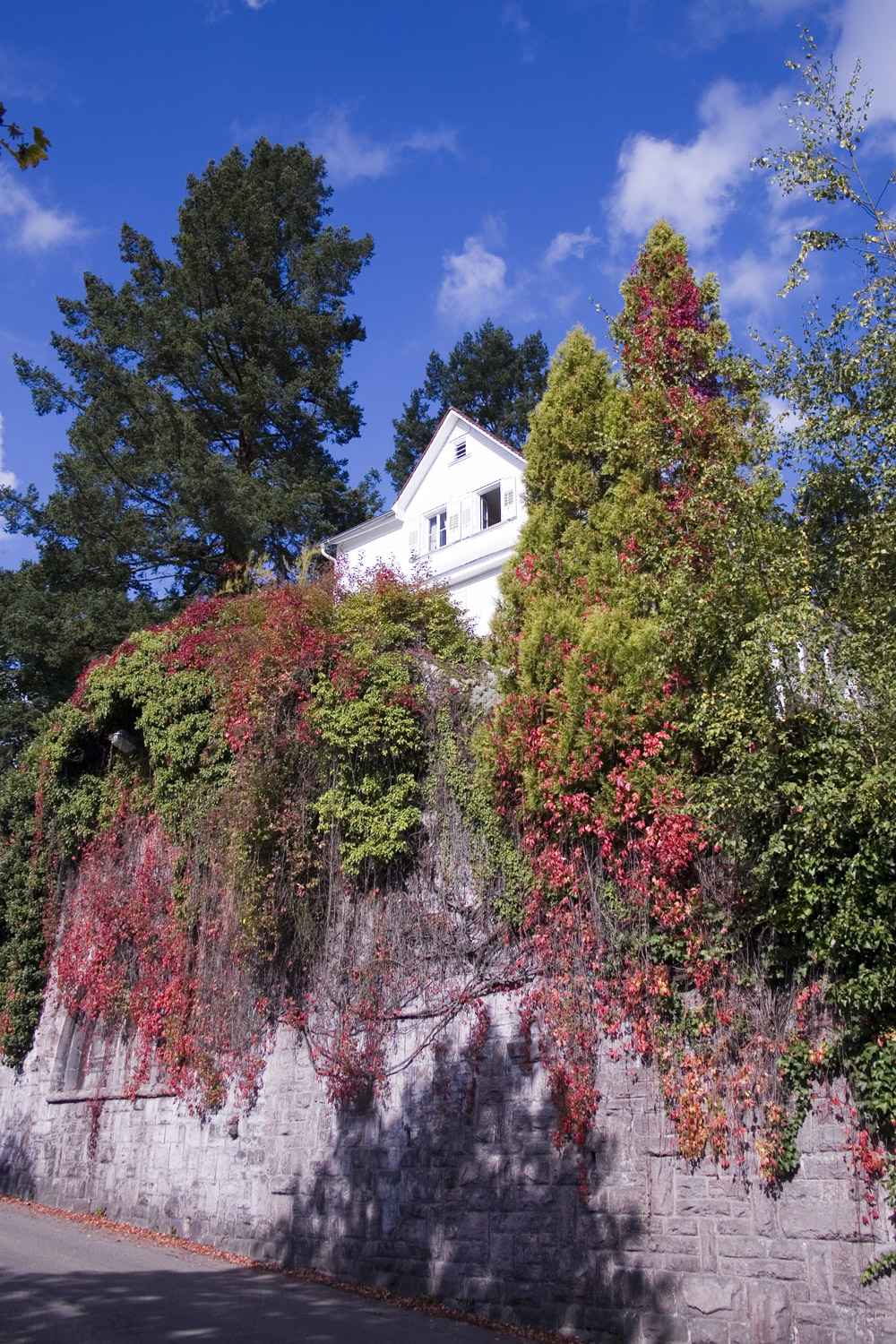
- Brahms House in 2010
- Location: Maximilianstraße. 85, Baden-Baden
- Coordinates: 48°44′40″N 8°15′40″E
- Type: Biographical museum
- Website: brahms-baden-baden.de

The Brahms House (Brahms-Haus), also known as Lichtental No. 8, is a biographical museum dedicated to Johannes Brahms in Baden-Baden, Germany. The museum is centered on the building's attic, where Brahms lived and worked on his music while in residence.

== History ==
Johannes Brahms lived seasonally in Lichtental No. 8 from 1865 to 1874, originally because of a tip from Clara Schumann. His first stay at the house lasted from May to October 1865. While residing here, Brahms worked on his first and second symphonies, the piano quintet, second string sextet, the Alto Rhapsody, and parts of A German Requiem.

By 1963, Lichtental No. 8 was in disrepair and was faced with demolition. To prevent this, the Brahms Society of Baden-Baden (Brahms Gesellschaft Baden-Baden) was formed in 1966 and began gathering donations. With those funds, the Society purchased the house in June 1967 and began renovating it. The house was opened to the public as the Brahms-Haus Museum a year later.

== Museum ==
Brahms's summer-time residence in the attic of Lichtental No. 8 is the center of the museum documenting the composer's life.

Every two years, the Baden-Baden Brahms Society organizes and hosts the Brahms Days in the city's concert halls.

A studio apartment is made available to qualifying guest musicians selected by the museum staff.

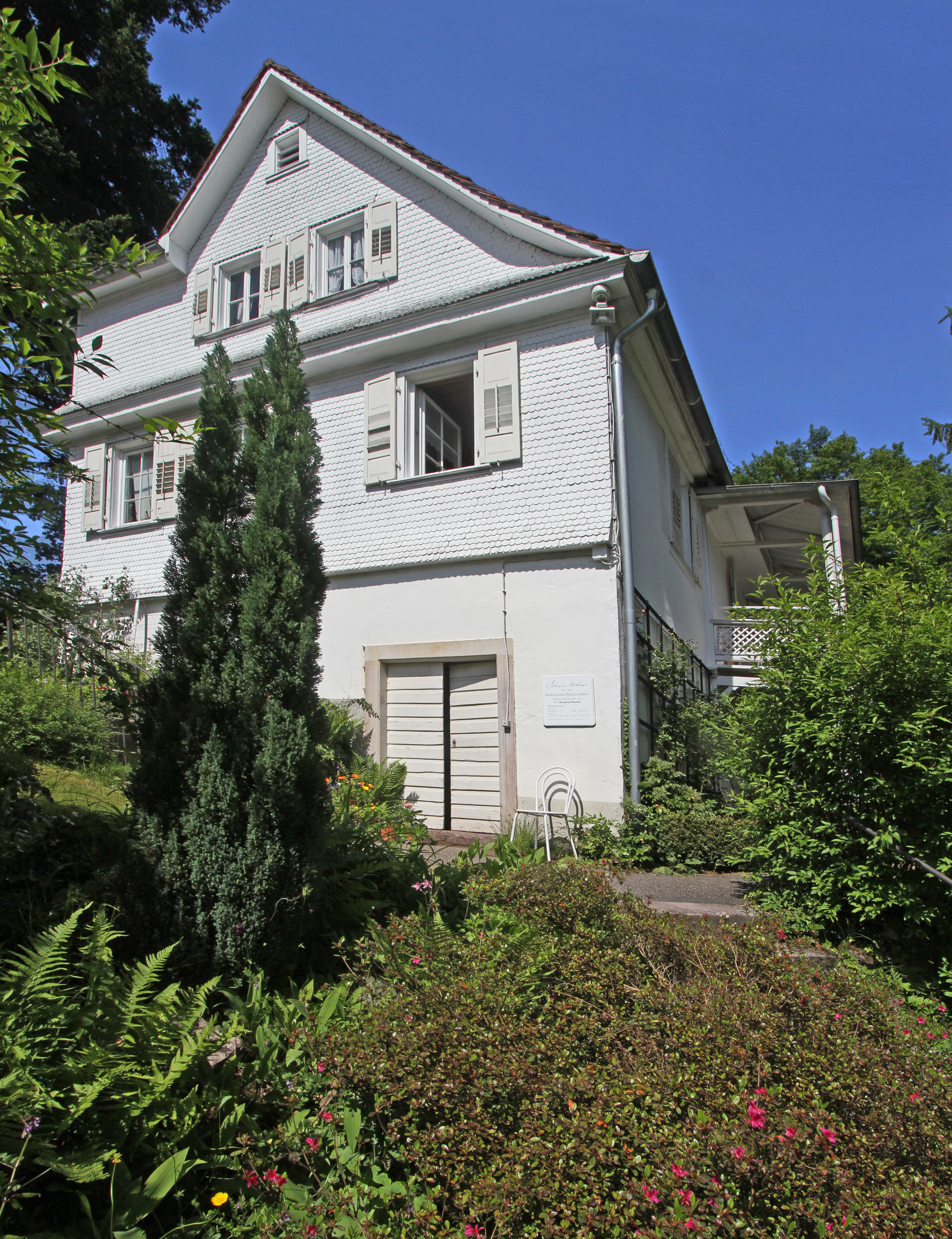

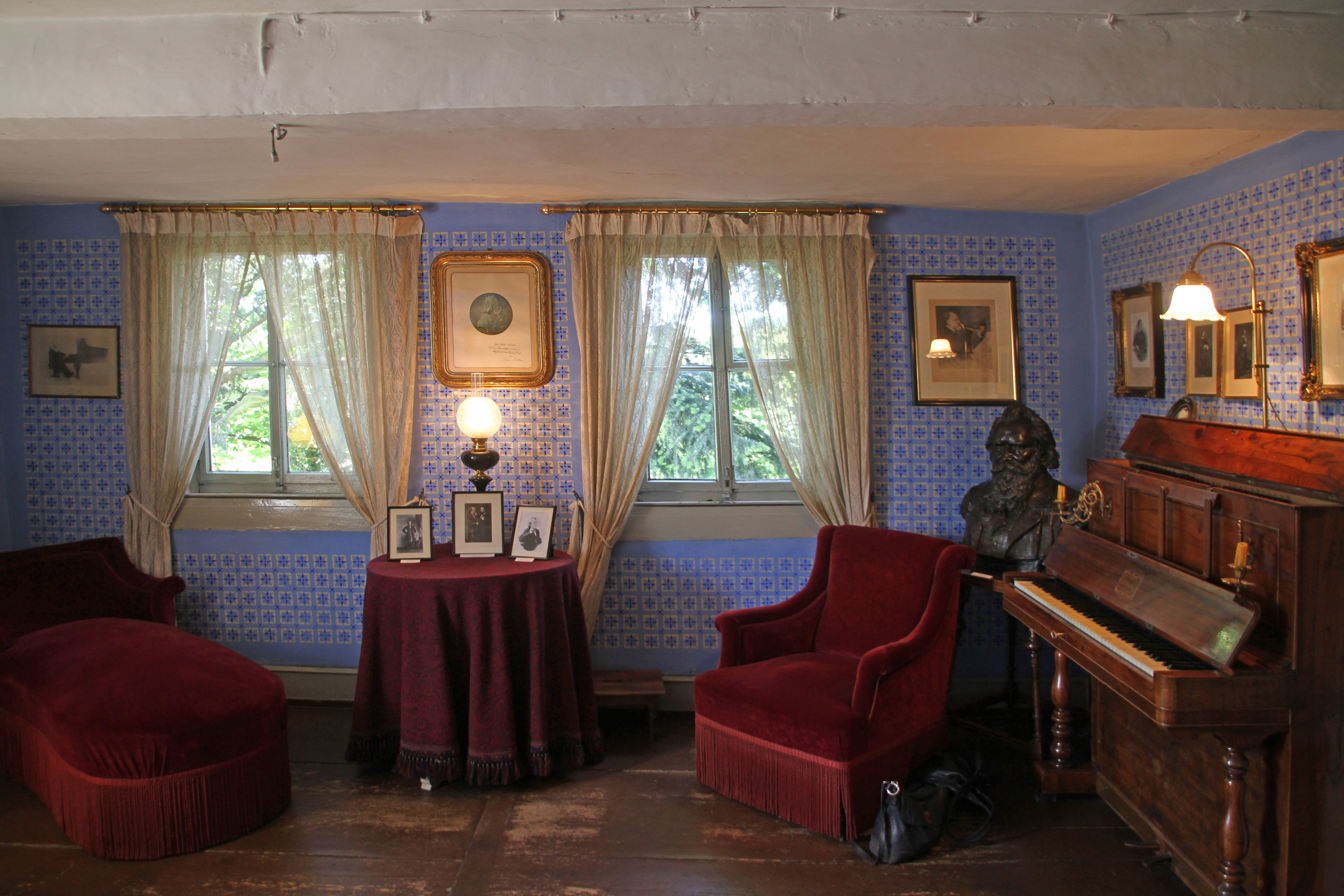

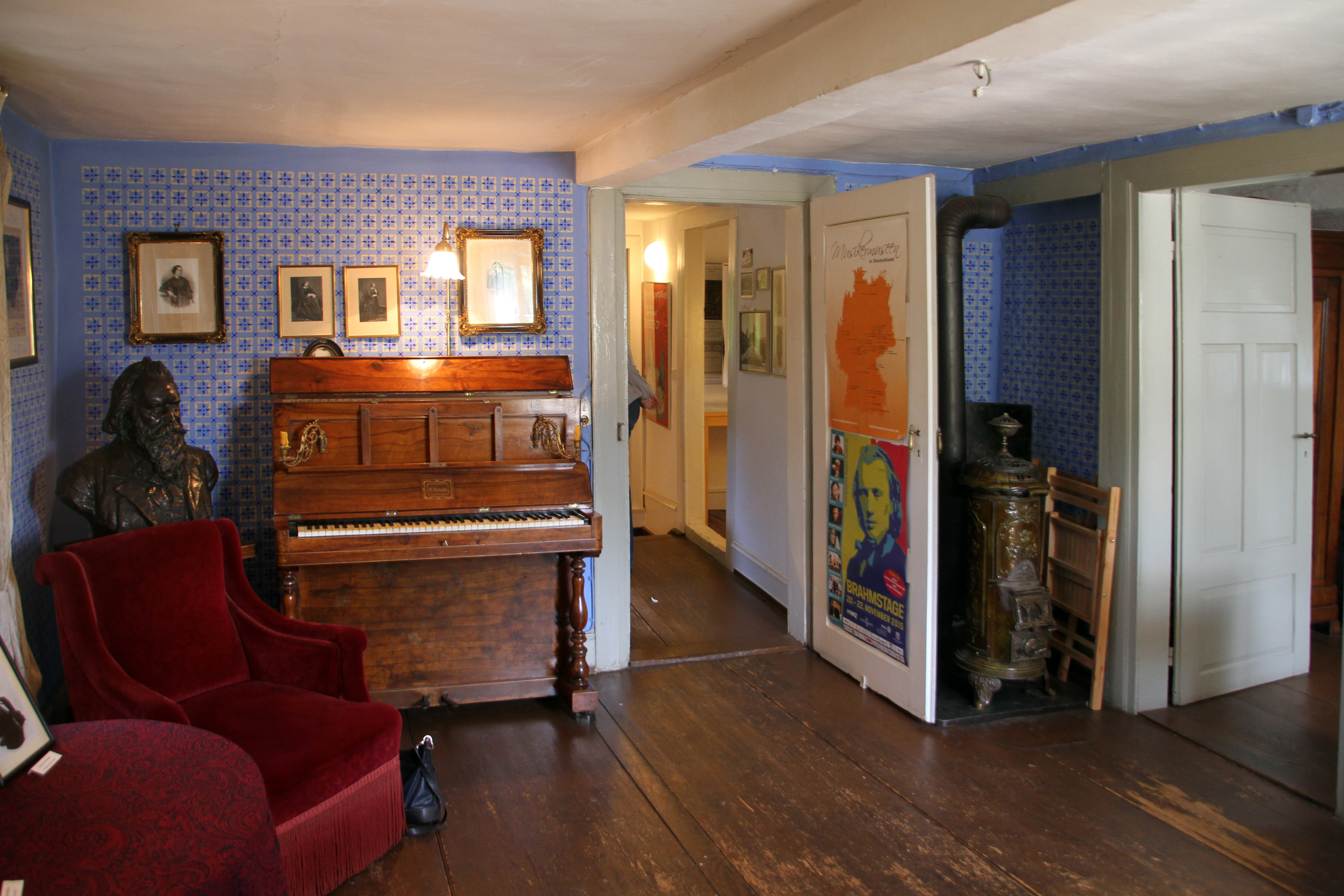

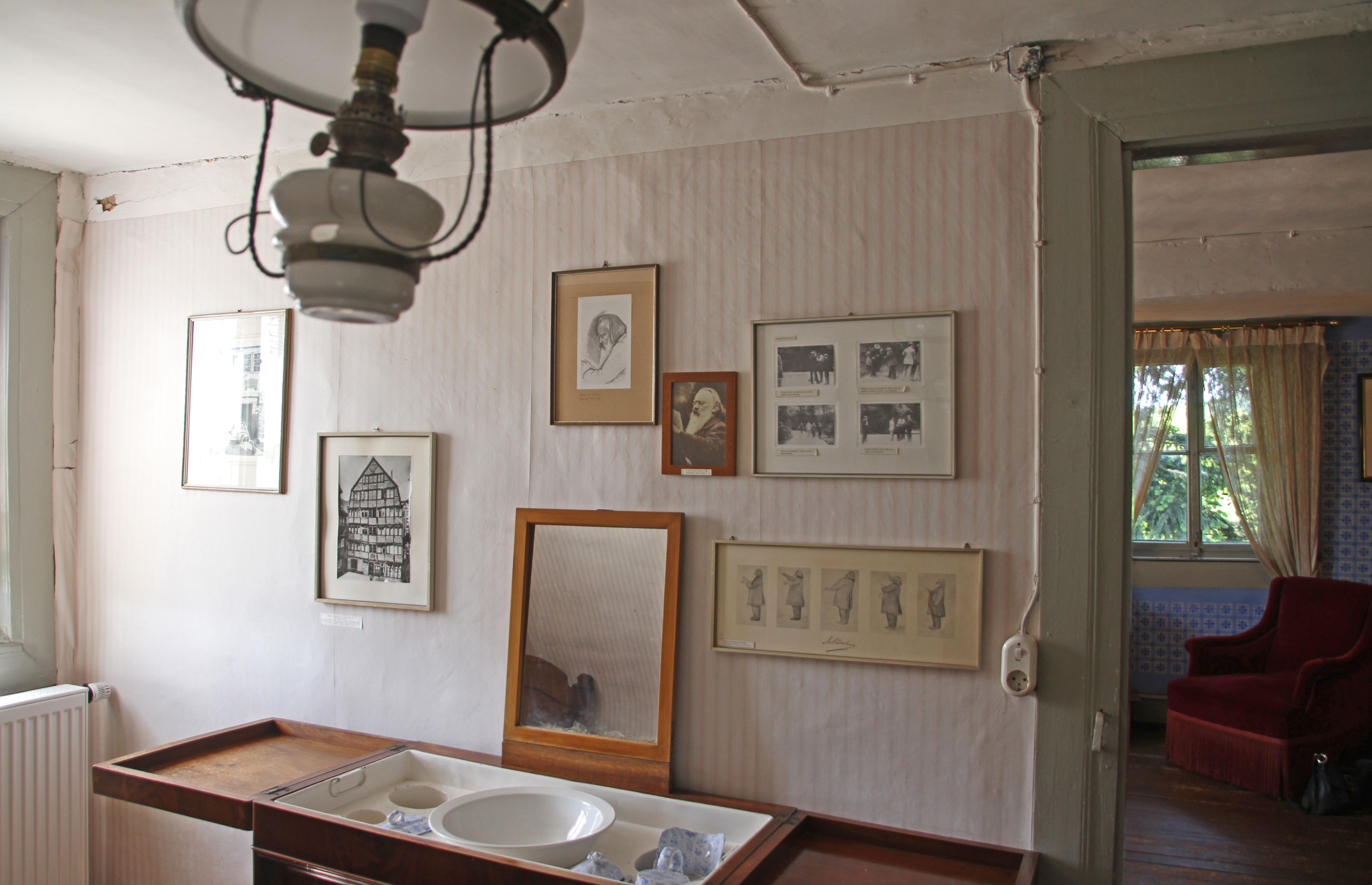

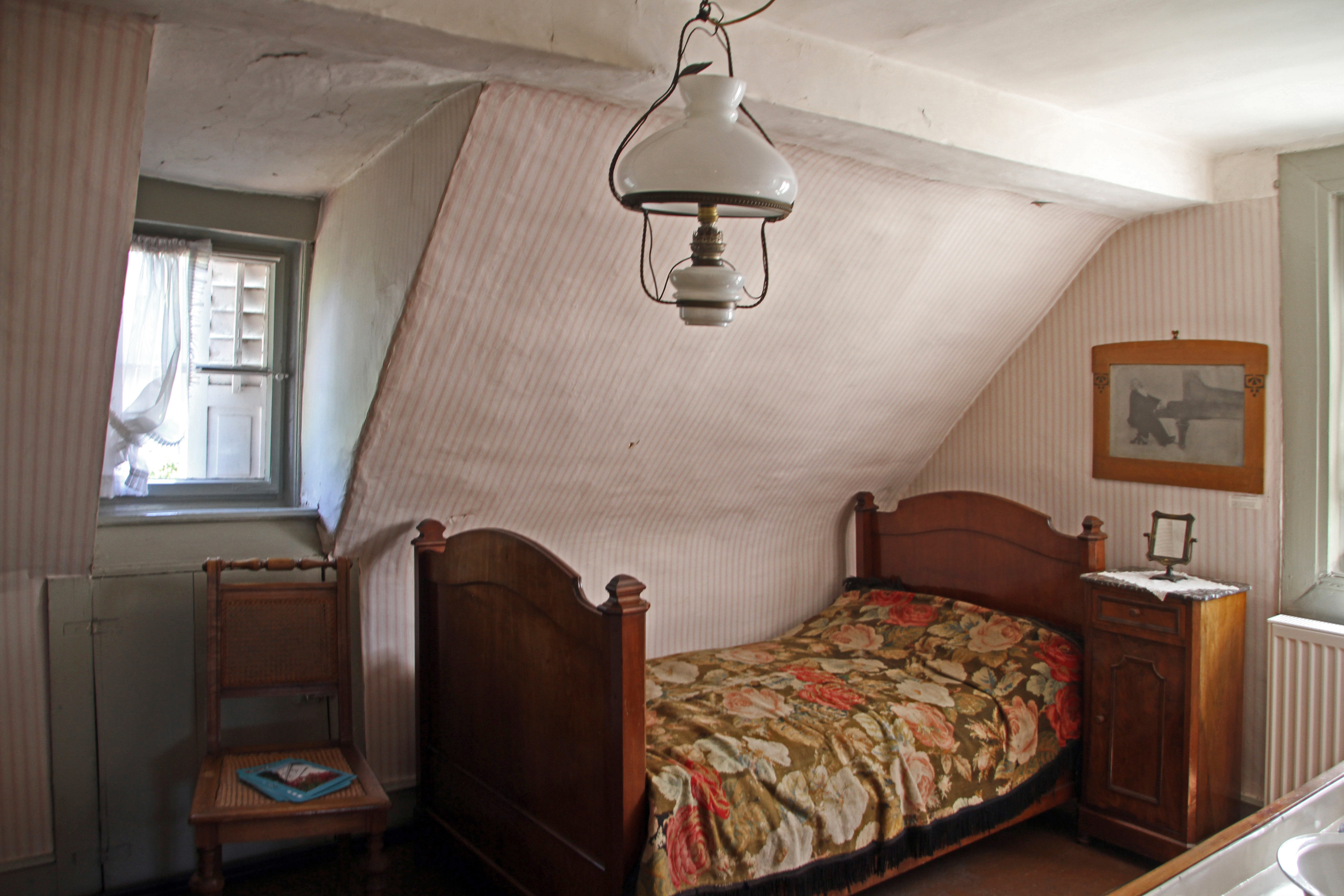

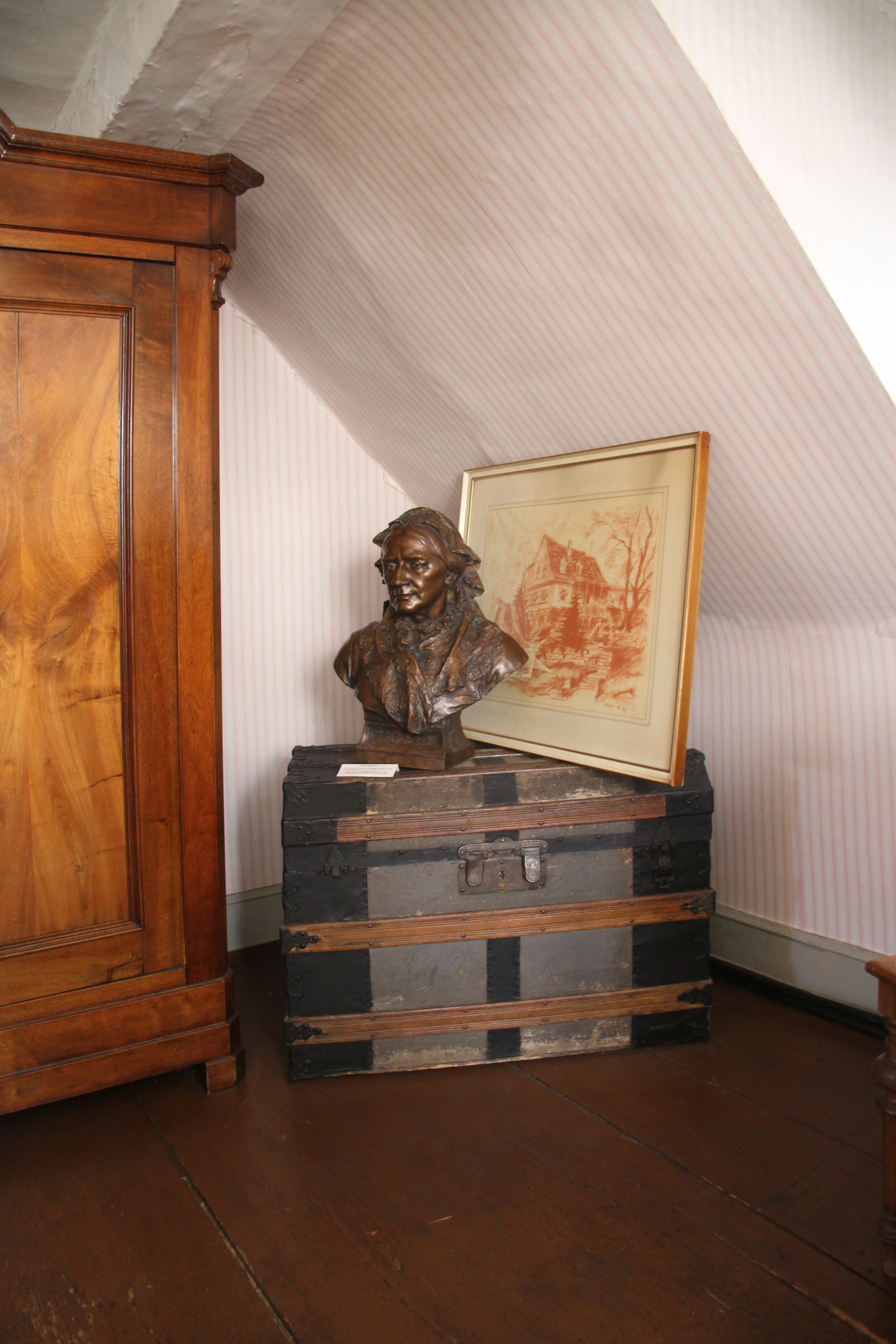

== See also ==
- List of music museums
