= Gösting =

Coordinates: 47°05′46″N 15°23′41″E

- 13th city district of Graz
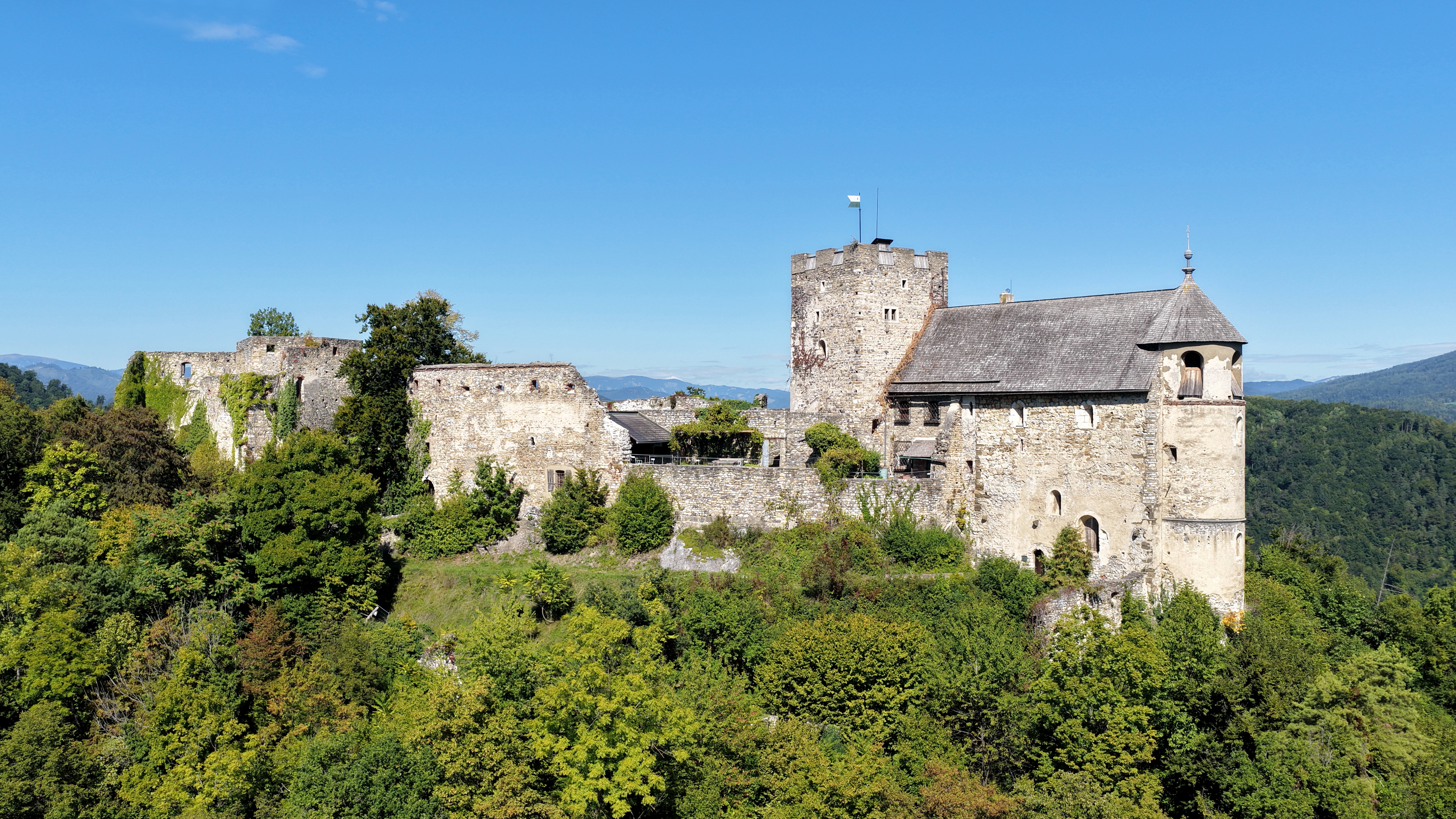
- The ruined Gösting Castle in 2006.
- Interactive map of Gösting
- Country: Austria
- Province: Styria
- Statutory city: Graz

Area
  - Total: 10.83 km^{2} (4.18 sq mi)

Population (2023)
  - Total: 11.129
  - Density: 1.028/km^{2} (2.661/sq mi)
- Postal codes: 8045, 8051, 8055

Gösting (German: [ɡœstiŋ]; from Slavic gostinca = hostel, or gozd = mountain forest) is the 13th city district of Graz, in the Austrian province of Styria. It is situated in the north-west of the city between the river Mur and the Plabutsch mountain and the range north of it on which the ruined Gösting Castle is located.

== History ==
Before the year 1138 the village and the castle were founded by the Aribon Swiker von Gösting. About 1430 the village contained 33 farms and several craftsmen among which were two millers in the still today called miller's quarter (Müllerviertel) and am Thalbach stream.

In 1707 the castle and the fiefdom (Herrschaft) were bought by the Counts of Attems. In the 18th century the castle fell more and more into disrepair after a fire caused by a lightning strike in 1723 destroyed it almost completely.

From 1850 until 1938 Gösting was a community of its own that was governed by its community leaders and since 1919 by its mayors. Some street names still bear their names, for example Franz Weixelbaum or Josef Pock. In 1931 Gösting got the market right and in 1938 became a part of Graz. Since 1946 it has been the 13th city district of the Styrian capital Graz. To the district also belongs the settlement Raach which is located further north and which developed during the 1940s on former pasture land.

== Buildings ==
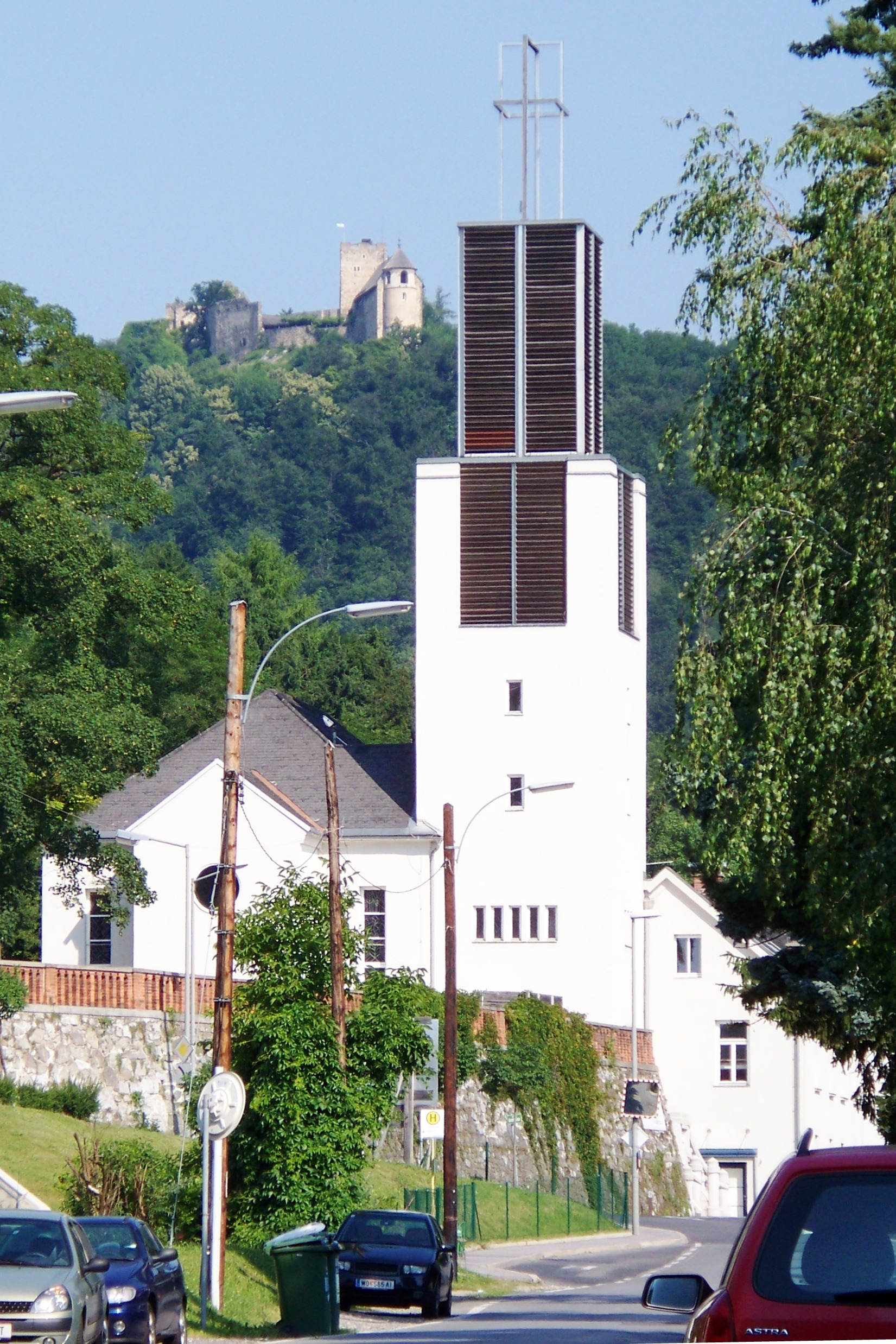
Church of St. Anne with the ruins of Gösting Castle in the background.

- Gösting Castle ruins: Today only its chapel, its keep and several remains of the walls remain. In the tower a small museum and a tavern were installed. There are magnificent views from the ruins over the Graz basin and the East Styrian hill country.
- Schloss Gösting: Built for the Attems family to replace the castle in the mountains after it burnt down, this simple Baroque residence stands on the Schlossplatz at the foot of the castle mountain.
- The Plabutscherschlössel
- The Church of St. Anne is situated in the former brewery in a closed down outpost of the Puntigam brewery.

== Economy, schools and traffic ==
- Several industrial facilities, that have settled along the freight railway station of Graz.
- Until the end of the 19th century there were vineyards on the hillsides. Until the beginning of the 21st century the Kleinoscheg sparkling wine cellars Kleinoscheg were situated here. Today only the street name Weinbergweg (vineyard way) indicates the former usage.
- Big wooden areas on the Plabutsch and Ruinenberg mountains
- The vocational school Höhere Technische Bundeslehranstalt BULME (since 1920 on today's location)
- North entrance to the Plabutsch tunnel of the Pyhrn Autobahn (opened in 1987)
- City bus lines number 40, 48, 52 and 85. From 1901 until the 1950s there was also a tram line towards the center of Graz. A railway station of the Graz - Bruck an der Mur part of the Southern Railway also existed once.
- In the district there is also a sport club called ASV Gösting. Its soccer team plays in the Styrian 1st class league.
