= Manfred Scheuer =

Austrian Roman Catholic bishop (born 1955)

The Most Reverend Manfred Scheuer
- Bishop of Linz
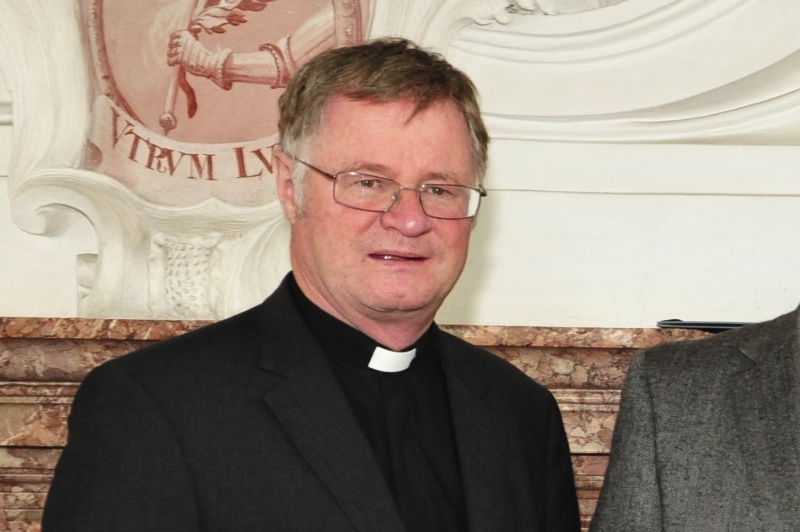
- Scheuer in 2016
- Church: Catholic Church
- Diocese: Linz
- Appointed: 18 November 2015
- Installed: 17 January 2016
- Predecessor: Ludwig Schwarz
- Previous post: Bishop of Innsbruck (2003–2015)

Orders
- Ordination: 10 October 1980 by Joseph Schröffer
- Consecration: 14 December 2003 by Alois Kothgasser

Personal details
- Born: Manfred Scheuer; 10 August 1955 (age 71) Haibach ob der Donau, Upper Austria, Austria
- Motto: Spiritus vivificat
- Coat of arms: Manfred Scheuer's coat of arms

Manfred Scheuer (born 10 August 1955) is an Austrian Roman Catholic prelate who has served as the Bishop of Linz since 17 January 2016. He previously served as Bishop of Innsbruck from 2003 to 2015. He was appointed to the Diocese of Linz by Pope Francis on 18 November 2015, succeeding Ludwig Schwarz.

Scheuer studied theology in Linz and Rome and subsequently pursued an academic career in Germany and Austria, specialising in dogmatic theology. Before his episcopal appointment, he was a professor at the Faculty of Theology in Trier. He was consecrated a bishop in December 2003.

== Early life and education ==
Scheuer was born on 10 August 1955 in Haibach ob der Donau, Upper Austria, in the Diocese of Linz. After completing his secondary education at the Episcopal Gymnasium Petrinum in Linz in 1974, he studied theology at the Philosophical-Theological College in Linz and entered the diocesan seminary. From 1976 to 1981, he continued his theological studies at the Pontifical Gregorian University in Rome, where he obtained a bachelor's degree in theology in 1979 and a licentiate in 1981.

== Priesthood and academic career ==
Scheuer was ordained a priest on 10 October 1980 in Rome for the Diocese of Linz. From 1981 to 1985, he served in pastoral ministry, initially in Steyr and subsequently in St. Georgen an der Gusen.

From 1985 to 1988, he worked as an assistant at the Institute of Dogmatic and Ecumenical Theology at the University of Freiburg. He completed his doctoral studies in theology there. Between 1988 and 1996, he served as spiritual director of the major seminary of the Diocese of Linz and taught spirituality at its theological faculty.

In 1997, Scheuer returned to Freiburg, where he worked in student chaplaincy and prepared his habilitation, which he completed in February 1999. During this period, he also undertook teaching assignments in Freiburg, Salzburg and St. Pölten. In 1999, he was appointed moderator of the cathedral parish in Linz and taught dogmatic theology at the Philosophical-Theological University of St. Pölten.

From 2000 to 2003, he was professor of dogmatic theology and the history of dogma at the Faculty of Theology of the University of Trier.

== Episcopal ministry ==
=== Bishop of Innsbruck ===
On 21 October 2003, Pope John Paul II appointed Scheuer Bishop of Innsbruck, succeeding Alois Kothgasser, who had been appointed Archbishop of Salzburg. At the time of his appointment, Scheuer was a professor of dogmatic theology at the University of Trier.

He received episcopal consecration on 14 December 2003 in Innsbruck Cathedral. The principal consecrator was Archbishop Alois Kothgasser, with Bishop Maximilian Aichern and Bishop Reinhold Stecher serving as co-consecrators. Scheuer adopted the episcopal motto Spiritus vivificat (The Spirit gives life).

During his twelve years in Innsbruck, Scheuer was involved in pastoral work, ecumenical dialogue and interreligious relations. He also advocated religious freedom and expressed concern for persecuted Christians, particularly in the Middle East.

In July 2015, Scheuer reiterated the Catholic Church's rejection of the cult surrounding Anderl von Rinn, associated with an antisemitic ritual murder legend. He affirmed that the cult was no longer recognised by the Church and supported the Church's rejection of antisemitism and efforts towards reconciliation with the Jewish community. He referred to the historical responsibility of Christians for anti-Jewish prejudice and violence.

=== Bishop of Linz ===
On 18 November 2015, Pope Francis accepted the resignation of Bishop Ludwig Schwarz and appointed Scheuer as his successor as Bishop of Linz, transferring him from Innsbruck.

Scheuer officially assumed leadership of the Diocese of Linz on 17 January 2016 at a celebration in Linz Cathedral. He became the 14th diocesan bishop of Linz.

As Bishop of Linz, Scheuer has emphasised pastoral outreach, social responsibility, ecumenism and dialogue between religious communities. He has also been involved in remembrance of the victims of National Socialism and the promotion of the cause of beatification of Austrian conscientious objector Franz Jägerstätter.

In November 2017, he initiated the Diocese of Linz's organisational and pastoral reform project known as Zukunftsweg, under the motto Kirche weit denken (Thinking about the Church broadly).

=== Austrian Bishops' Conference ===
Scheuer has held several responsibilities within the Episcopal Conference of Austria. He was elected its deputy chairman in June 2020, succeeding Archbishop Franz Lackner in that position after Lackner became chairman. Scheuer was re-elected deputy chairman in June 2026.

His responsibilities within the conference have included ecumenism, relations with Judaism, international Church cooperation and missionary organisations. He has also been associated with the Mauthausen Committee and the Pro Scientia student support organisation.

Catholic Church titles
| Preceded by Alois Kothgasser | Bishop of Innsbruck; 2003–2015 | Succeeded by Hermann Glettler |
| Preceded by Ludwig Schwarz | Bishop of Linz; 2015–present | Succeeded by Incumbent |
