= Catholic Church in Austria =

- Austrian German: Katholische Kirche in Österreich
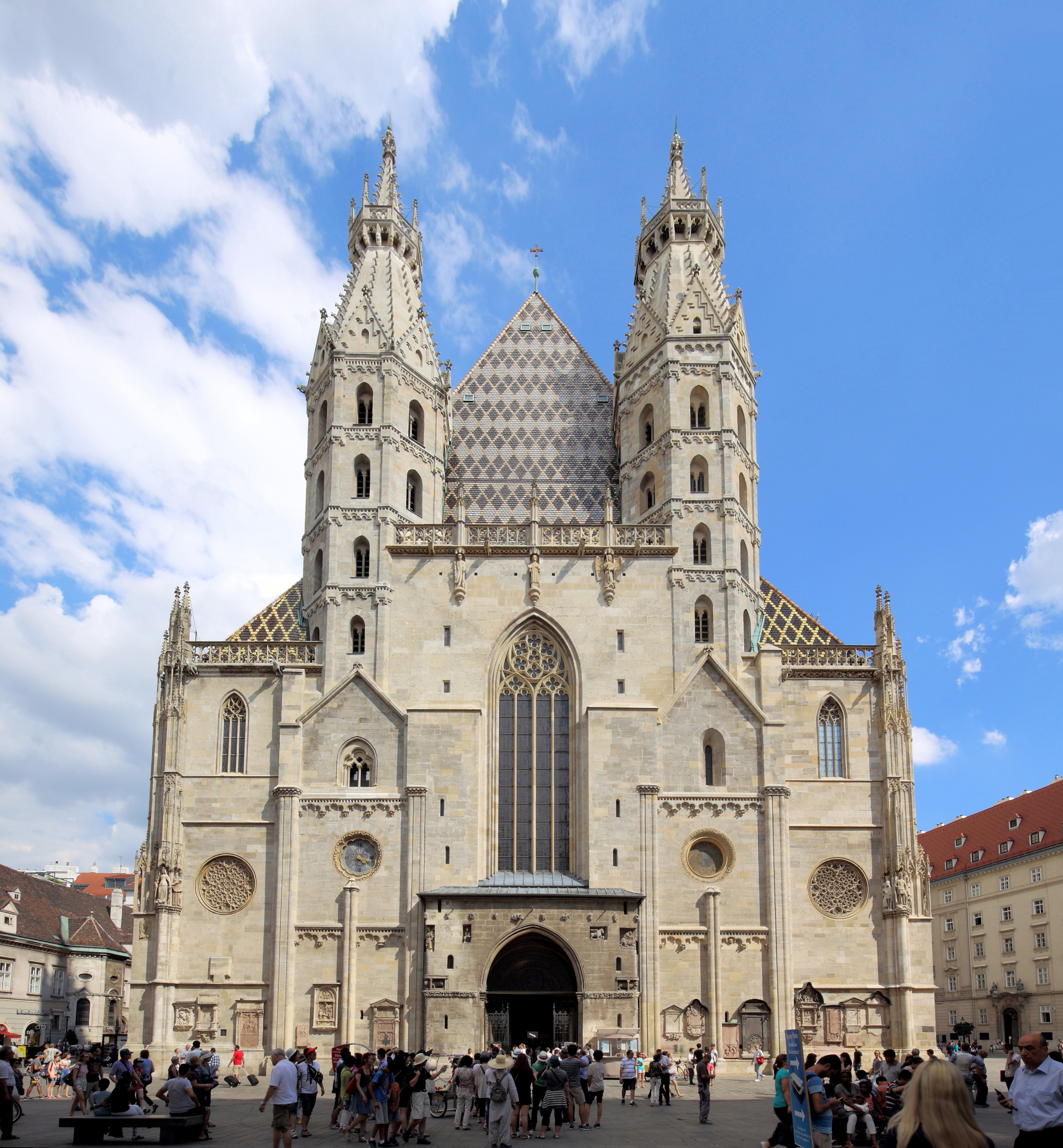
- St. Stephen's Cathedral, Vienna.
- Type: National polity
- Classification: Catholic
- Orientation: Latin
- Polity: Episcopal
- Governance: Episcopal Conference of Austria
- Pope: Leo XIV
- Chairman: Franz Lackner
- Primas Germaniae: Franz Lackner
- Apostolic Nuncio: Pedro López Quintana
- Region: Austria
- Language: German, Latin
- Headquarters: Vienna, Austria
- Members: 4,557,471 (49.6 %) (2024)
- Official website: Episcopal Conference of Austria

The Catholic Church in Austria is part of the worldwide Catholic Church in full communion with the Pope in Rome. The Church's governing body in Austria is the Austrian Conference of Catholic Bishops, made up of the hierarchy of the two archbishops (Vienna and Salzburg), the bishops and the abbot of territorial abbey of Wettingen-Mehrerau. Nevertheless, each bishop is independent in his own diocese, answerable only to the Pope. The current president of the Conference of Catholic Bishops is Cardinal Christoph Schönborn. The Austrian church is the largest Christian Confession of Austria, with 4.56 million members (49.6 % of the total Austrian population) in 2024. For more than 50 years, however, the proportion of Catholics in the country has decreased.

Although Austria has no primate, the archbishop of Salzburg is titled Primus Germaniae (Primate of Germany).

The Holy See is represented in Austria by the Apostolic Nunciature to Austria.

== History ==
Christianity arrived in Austria through Roman interaction with the region. The first documented evidence of Christianity in Austria dates back to around the year 174. This was the location of the dioceses of Teurnia and Virunum (near the ancient capitals of the province of Noricum, Teurnia and Virunum in Carinthia) and Lauriacum (Lorch in Upper Austria, near the new capital Ovilava/Wels), as well as Aguntum. Amid the turmoil of the Migration Period, Christian institutions were largely lost, but the practice of the Christian faith was not. This is evidenced, for example, by the work of the martyr Florian of Lorch (d. 304) and the missionary Severin of Noricum (d. 482).

A further Christianization took place in the Middle Ages, primarily through the missionaries Rupert and Virgil—who found strong Christian communities still thriving in the Salzburg area and in Lorch—and through the dioceses of Passau and Salzburg, founded by Boniface in 739. Passau carried out its missionary work downstream along the Danube, while Salzburg focused on the Alpine region. Numerous monasteries were established: Mondsee (748), Innichen (769), Kremsmünster (777), and St. Florian (around 800). These structures could not be consolidated until after Charlemagne’s campaign against the Avars around 800 and the Battle of Lechfeld in 955; thus, the Freising estate of Ostarrichi (an imperial grant in 996) became the nucleus of present-day Austria.

== Ecclesiastical structure ==
- Archdiocese of Vienna with the following suffragan dioceses:
  - Diocese of Eisenstadt
  - Diocese of Linz
  - Diocese of St. Pölten
- Archdiocese of Salzburg with the following suffragans
  - Diocese of Graz-Seckau
  - Diocese of Gurk
  - Diocese of Feldkirch
  - Diocese of Innsbruck
- Territorial Abbey of Wettingen-Mehrerau (immediately subject to the Holy See)
- Military Ordinariate of Austria (immediately subject to the Holy See)

== Statistics ==
Main Churches in Austria
Year	Population	Catholics	%	Protestants	%
1951	6,933,905	6,170,084	89.0%	429,493	6.2%
1961	7,073,807	6,295,075	89.0%	438,663	6.2%
1971	7,491,526	6,548,316	87.4%	447,070	6,0%
1981	7,555,338	6,372,645	84.3%	423,162	5,6%
1991	7,795,786	6,081,454	78.0%	388,709	5.0%
2001	8,032,926	5,915,421	73.6%	376,150	4.7%
2011	8,408,121	5,403,722	64.3%	319,752	3.8%
2021	8,979,894	4,827,683	53.8%	270,585	3.0%
2022	9,104,772	4,733,085	52.0%	263,627	2.9%
2023	9,158,750	4,638,842	50.6%	255,738	2.8%
2024	9,197,213	4,557,471	49.6%	248,113	2.7%
2025	9,215,956	4,488.101	48.7%	-	-

Over the last 50 years, the proportion of Catholics in Austria has decreased, primarily due to secularization and migration (from 89% in 1961 to under 50% in 2024). The number of Sunday churchgoers in 2023 was around 4.1 percent (as percentage of the total Austrian population that is 378,797 churchgoers out of a total population of 9,158,750). Pro Oriente reports that there are 2 priests and around 100 lay members of the Hungarian Greek Catholic Church living in Austria.

71% of Austrian Catholics support same-sex marriage and 26% oppose it.

== List of Catholic organisations in Austria ==
- Caritas Austria
- Katholische Jungschar
- Katholische Jugend

== Notable people ==
- Mozart
- Emerich Coreth
- Leopold III, Margrave of Austria
- Heinrich Maier, important resistance fighter against Nazi terror
- Gregor Mendel
- Zacharias Traber
- Franz Wasner

== Gallery ==
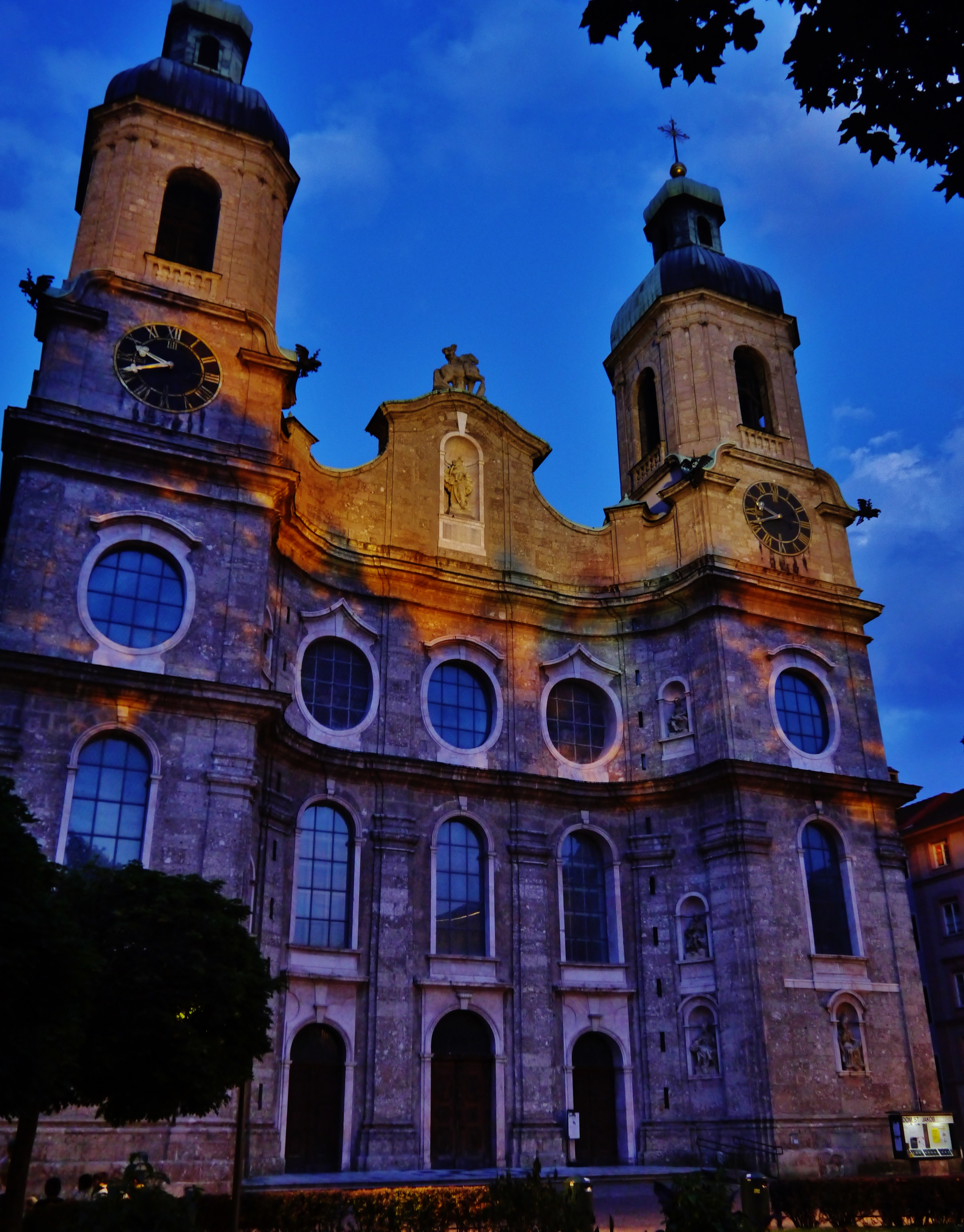
Innsbruck Cathedral

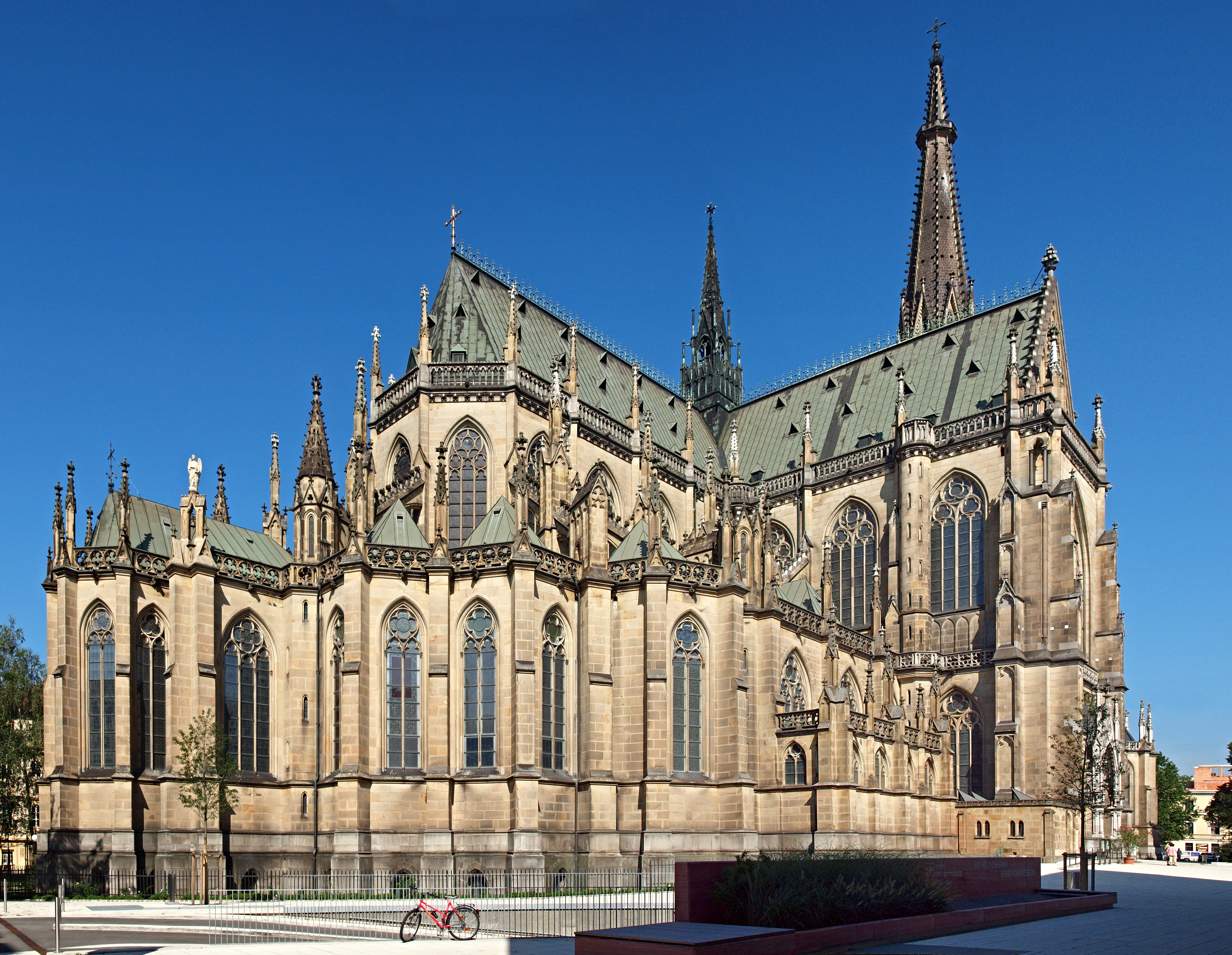
Linz Cathedral

== See also ==
- Catholic Church by country
- Eastern Orthodoxy in Austria
- Freedom of religion in Austria
- Old Catholic Church of Austria
- Religion in Austria
