= Alois Kothgasser =

Austrian Roman Catholic prelate (1937–2024)

His Excellency Alois Kothgasser
- Archbishop Emeritus of Salzburg; Primas Germaniae
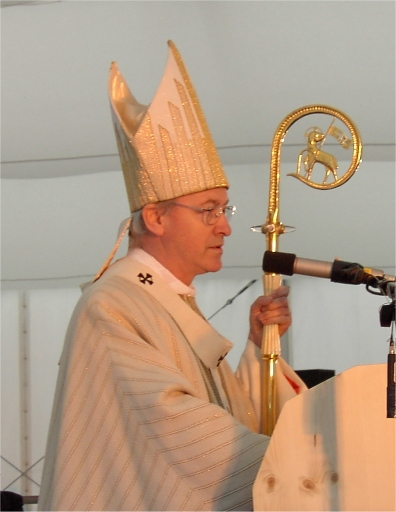
- Alois Kothgasser in August 2004
- Appointed: 27 November 2002
- Term ended: 4 November 2013
- Predecessor: Georg Eder
- Successor: Franz Lackner
- Previous post: Bishop of Innsbruck (1997–2002)

Orders
- Ordination: 9 February 1964 by Giuseppe Cognata
- Consecration: 23 November 1997 by Reinhold Stecher

Personal details
- Born: 29 May 1937 Sankt Stefan im Rosental, Styria, Austria
- Died: 22 February 2024 (aged 86) Salzburg, Austria
- Motto: VERITATEM FACIENTES IN CHARITATE
- Coat of arms: Alois Kothgasser's coat of arms

Styles of Alois Kothgasser
- Reference style: His Excellency; The Most Reverend
- Spoken style: Your Excellency
- Religious style: Archbishop

Alois Kothgasser (29 May 1937 – 22 February 2024) was an Austrian Roman Catholic prelate. He was the bishop of Innsbruck from 1997 to 2002 and Primas Germaniae and archbishop of Salzburg from 2003 to 2013. He died in Salzburg on 22 February 2024, at the age of 86.

Kothgasser was a former Grand Prior of the Austrian Lieutenancy of the Equestrian Order of the Holy Sepulchre of Jerusalem.

Catholic Church titles
Preceded by Georg Eder	Archbishop of Salzburg; 2002–2013	Succeeded by Franz Lackner
Preceded by Reinhold Stecher	Bishop of Innsbruck; 1997–2002	Succeeded by Manfred Scheuer
