= Episcopal Conference of Austria =

Assembly of Catholic bishops

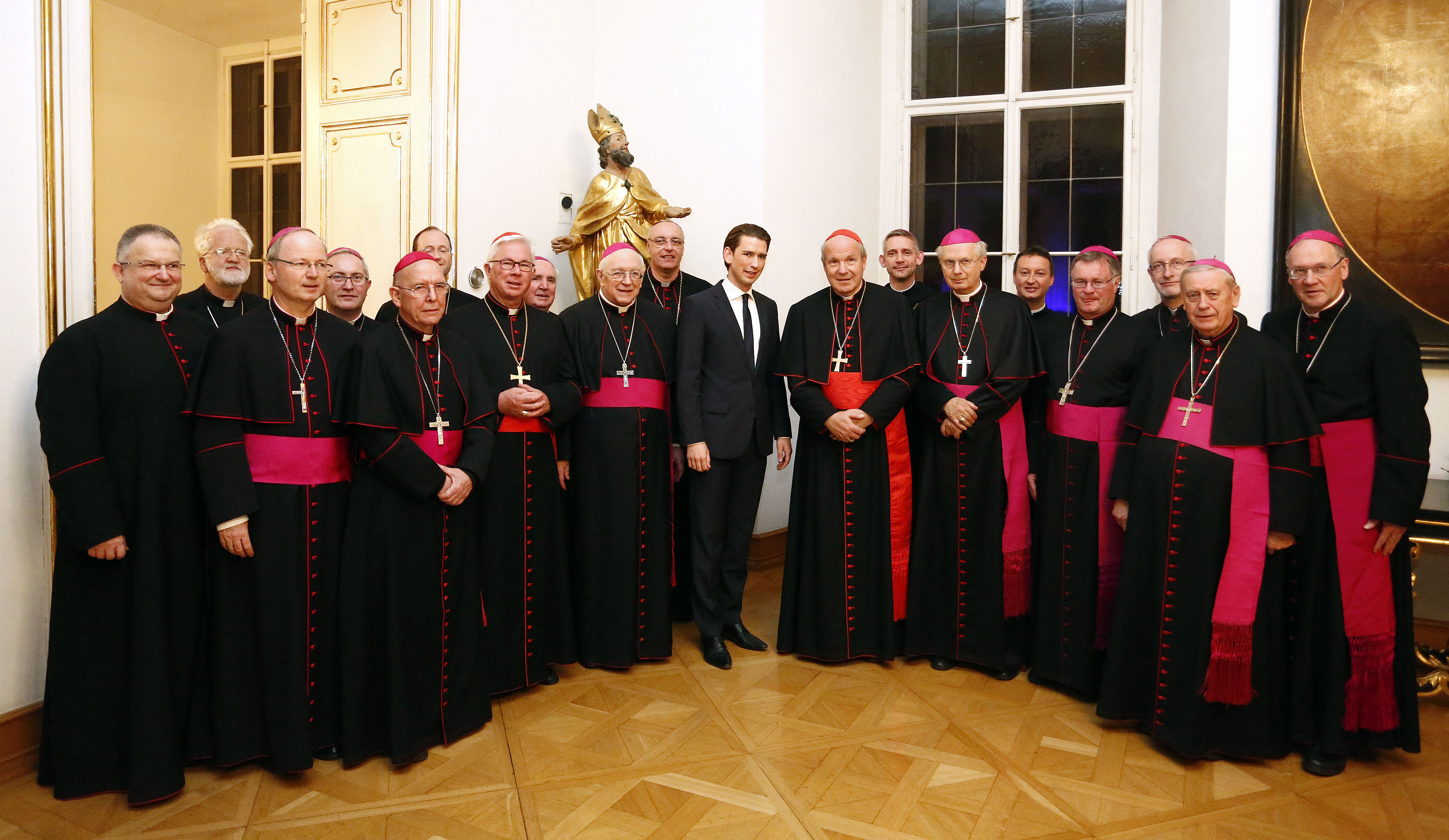
2014 meeting of the Austrian Bishops' Conference with Foreign Minister Sebastian Kurz (centre)

The Austrian Bishops' Conference (German: Österreichische Bischofskonferenz) is the official assembly of the Roman Catholic bishops of Austria. It is the supreme authority of the Roman Catholic Church in Austria, established as a formal body under public law in 1849. Its members include the archbishops of Vienna and Salzburg, all diocesan and auxiliary bishops, as well as the abbot of immediate Wettingen-Mehrerau Abbey.

The Episcopal Conference represents the Catholic Church towards the Austrian Federal Government in all matters of legal relationships between church and state and freedom of religion. It is also the supreme ecclesiastical authority in Austria concerning Catholic canon law. The assembly is a member of the Council of the Bishops' Conferences of Europe (CCEE) and of the Commission of the Bishops' Conferences of the European Community. It also runs the official Catholic news agency Kathpress.

The current chairman of the Bishop's Conference is Franz Lackner, the Archbishop of Salzburg.

== Legal bases ==
The Conference functions in accordance with the Documents of the Second Vatican Council, in particular the Christus Dominus Decree on the Pastoral Office of Bishops (37/38), the 1983 Code of Canon Law (Cann. 447–459), and its own constitutions. Its legal position as a formal corporation under public law and representative body of a state-recognised religious community was confirmed by a 1933 concordat between the Holy See and the First Austrian Republic.

== Active members ==
=== Conference Leadership ===
- Franz Lackner O.F.M., Archbishop of Salzburg (chairman)
- Manfred Scheuer, Bishop of Linz (deputy chairman)

=== Members ===
- Alois Schwarz, Bishop of Sankt Pölten
- Werner Freistetter, Military Ordinary of Austria
- Josef Marketz, Bishop of Gurk
- Benno Elbs, Bishop of Feldkirch
- Wilhelm Krautwaschl, Bishop of Graz-Seckau
- Aegidius Zsifkovics, Bishop of Eisenstadt
- Hermann Glettler, Bishop of Innsbruck
- Franz Scharl, Auxiliary Bishop of Vienna
- Stephan Turnovszky, Auxiliary Bishop of Vienna
- Hansjörg Hofer, Auxiliary Bishop of Salzburg
- Anton Leichtfried, Auxiliary Bishop of Sankt Pölten
- Johannes Freitag, Auxiliary Bishop of Graz-Seckau
- Vinzenz Wohlwend, O.Cist., Abbot of Wettingen-Mehrerau Abbey
- Josef Grünwidl, Archbishop of Vienna

== Chairmen ==
- Cardinal Theodor Innitzer (1933–1955), Archbishop of Vienna
- Archbishop Andreas Rohracher (1955–1959), Archbishop of Salzburg
- Cardinal Franz König (1959–1985), Archbishop of Vienna
- Archbishop Karl Berg (1985–1989), Archbishop of Salzburg
- Cardinal Hans Hermann Groer, O.S.B. (1989–1995), Archbishop of Vienna
- Bishop Johann Weber (1995–1998), Bishop of Graz–Seckau
- Cardinal Christoph Schönborn O.P. (1998–2020), Archbishop of Vienna
- Archbishop Franz Lackner O.F.M. (2020–present), Archbishop of Salzburg

== See also ==
- Catholic Church in Austria
