= Elmar Fischer =

Roman Catholic bishop of Feldkirch, Austria (1936–2022)

- Bishop of Feldkirch
- Church: Catholic Church
- Diocese: Diocese of Feldkirch
- In office: 24 May 2005 – 15 November 2011
- Predecessor: Klaus Küng
- Successor: Benno Elbs

Orders
- Ordination: 29 June 1961 by Bruno Wechner
- Consecration: 3 July 2005 by Klaus Küng

Personal details
- Born: 6 October 1936 Feldkirch, Voralberg, Federal State of Austria
- Died: 19 January 2022 (aged 85) Feldkirch, Voralberg, Austria

Elmar Fischer (6 October 1936 – 19 January 2022) was an Austrian Roman Catholic prelate.

Fischer was born in Feldkirch, Vorarlberg, Austria. He was ordained to the priesthood in 1961 for the Roman Catholic Diocese of Feldkirch, Austria. He served as the bishop of the diocese from 2005 until his retirement in 2011.

He died from COVID-19 in Feldkirch, Vorarlberg, on 19 January 2022, at the age of 85.
