= Archdiocese of Vaduz =

Catholic archdiocese covering all of Liechtenstein

Archdiocese of Vaduz Archidioecesis Vaduzensis Erzbistum Vaduz

Catholic
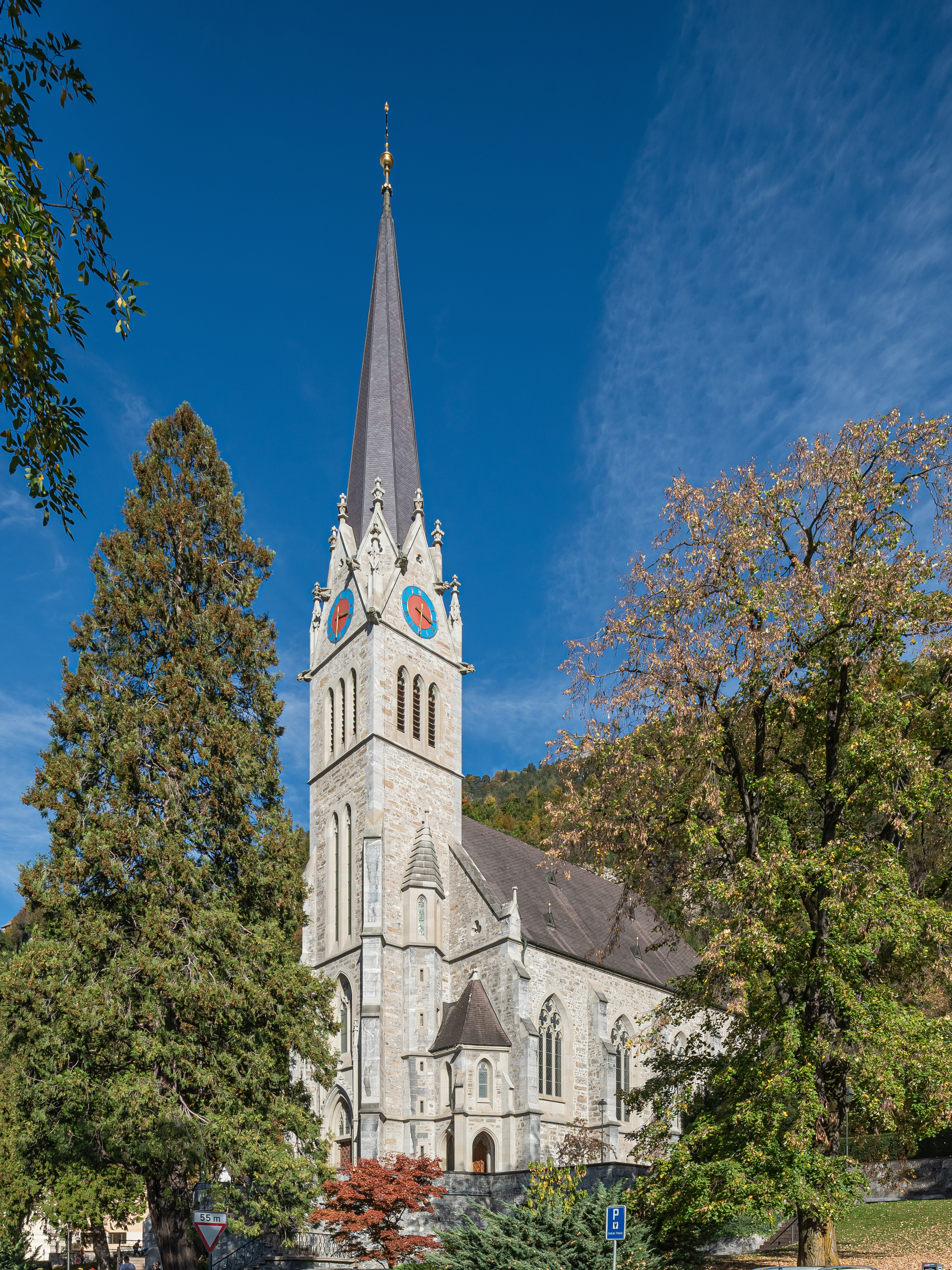
- Cathedral of St. Florin

Location
- Country: Liechtenstein
- Territory: Entire Country
- Ecclesiastical province: Immediately subject to the Holy See
- Coordinates: 47.1448°N 9.5232°E

Statistics
- Area: 160 km^{2} (62 sq mi)
- Population: Total; Catholics: (as of 2014); ▲35,894; ▲27,279 (▼76%)
- Parishes: 12

Information
- Denomination: Catholic
- Sui iuris church: Latin Church
- Rite: Roman Rite
- Established: 2 December 1997
- Cathedral: Cathedral of St. Florin
- Patron saint: Holy Virgin Mary, Mother of God
- Secular priests: 23

Current leadership
- Pope: Leo XIV
- Archbishop: Sede Vacante (canonical vacancy)
- Apostolic Administrator: Benno Elbs
- Bishops emeritus: Wolfgang Haas

Map
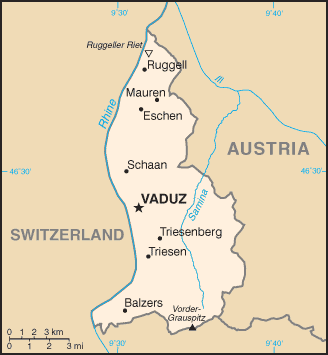
- Archdiocese of Vaduz (light)

Website
- erzbistum-vaduz.li

The Archdiocese of Vaduz (Latin: Archidioecesis Vaduzensis), which was erected in 1997, is a Latin Church diocese of the Catholic Church. It encompasses the entire territory of the Principality of Liechtenstein. The current archbishop is Benno Elbs, since 2023.

== History ==
The Archdiocese of Vaduz was erected by Pope John Paul II in the apostolic constitution Ad satius consulendum on 2 December 1997. Its territory, taken from Swiss Diocese of Chur, consists of the entire Principality of Liechtenstein. Before then it had been the Liechtenstein Deanery within the Diocese of Chur. The Archdiocese of Vaduz does not belong to any conference of bishops and reports directly to the Holy See.

Wolfgang Haas, who had been a controversial bishop of Chur since 1988, was appointed to head the new archdiocese. He took possession on his see on 21 December 1997 in Vaduz Cathedral, which had been the parish church of St. Florian.

Haas resigned from his post on 20 September 2023 due to age limits and Pope Francis appointed Austrian Benno Elbs as Apostolic Administrator. There was speculation that with Haas's resignation in 2023 the archdiocese might disappear, given that it was created for him and is extremely small, isolated from national bishops organizations. Hereditary Prince Alois has expressed his hope that the archdiocese continue to exist. Archbishop Paul Gallagher of the Vatican's Secretariat of State indicated during an April 2023 visit to Vaduz that the archdiocese would continue to exist.

== Patrons ==
The principal patron of the Archdiocese is the Holy Virgin Mary, Mother of God, under the title of her Nativity (September 8). Additional patrons are the martyr St. Lucius (St. Luzi), also a patron of the diocese of Chur, and St. Florin.

== Composition ==
The Archdiocese consists of twelve parishes.

== Ordinaries ==
- Wolfgang Haas (2 December 1997 – 20 September 2023)
  - Benno Elbs (Bishop of Feldkirch), apostolic administrator since September 2023

== See also ==
- Religion in Liechtenstein
- Catholic Church in Liechtenstein
