= Ludwig Schwarz =

Austrian Roman Catholic bishop (1940–2026)

Ludwig Schwarz, S.D.B.
- Bishop of Linz
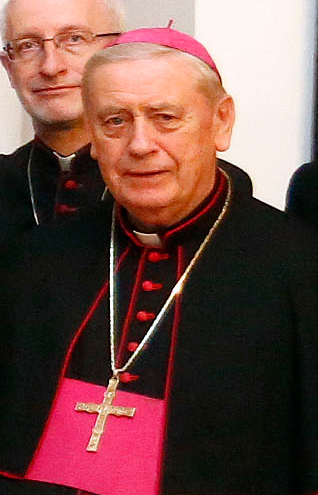
- Bishop Schwarz
- Church: Roman Catholic Church
- Archdiocese: Vienna
- Diocese: Linz
- Installed: 18 September 2005
- Term ended: 18 November 2015
- Predecessor: Maximilian Aichern
- Successor: Manfred Scheuer
- Previous posts: Auxiliary Bishop of Vienna and Titular Bishop of Simidicca (2001–2005)

Orders
- Ordination: 29 June 1964 by Josef Stimpfle
- Consecration: 25 November 2001 by Christoph Schönborn, Alois Kothgasser, Ján Sokol

Personal details
- Born: 4 June 1940 Most pri Bratislave, Slovak Republic
- Died: 19 November 2026 (aged 86) Kritzendorf, Klosterneuburg, Lower Austria, Austria
- Education: University of Vienna
- Motto: Servite Domino in Laetitia
- Coat of arms: Ludwig Schwarz, S.D.B.'s coat of arms

Ludwig Schwarz, S.D.B. (4 June 1940 – 19 November 2026), was an Austrian Roman Catholic prelate who served as a bishop of the Diocese of Linz, Austria, from 2005 to 2015. A member of the Salesians of Don Bosco, he was previously an auxiliary bishop for the Archdiocese of Vienna from 2001 to 2005.

== Life ==
Ludwig Schwarz was the first of nine children and grew up in Most pri Bratislave. After the expulsion of his family from Slovakia in 1945, he arrived in Vienna where he attended primary school. He attended a gymnasium in Vienna for a time, but switched to the Salesian school in Ebreichsdorf-Unterwaltersdorf at the age of fourteen. In June 1959, he sat for the Matura exams and subsequently joined the order of the Salesians of Don Bosco. He was assigned a two-year teaching practicum; for the first year he served as a general assistant in Ebreichsdorf, and the second at the Schülerheim Vinzentinum in Klagenfurt.

He studied philosophy in Ebreichsdorf and Catholic theology in Klagenfurt; from 1961 to 1964 he studied at Benediktbeuern Theological College (Philosophisch-Theologischen Hochschule Benediktbeuern). On 29 June 1964, he was ordained to the priesthood by the Bishop of Augsburg, Josef Stimpfle. He afterwards served briefly as assistant chaplain at a parish church in Graz. He then studied classical philology and archeology at the University of Vienna, and was also the hospital chaplain at Sacred Heart Hospital (Herz Jesu Krankenhaus Wien). He received his doctorate in 1970. From 1969 to 1978, he was rector of an inter-diocesan seminary, Canisiusheim Centrum Horn. Until 1984, he was superior of the Austrian province of the Salesians, situated in Vienna.

In 1984 he was appointed to a directorship at the Salesian Pontifical University in Rome. Starting in 1985, he taught Christian classical philology at the university. In 1993, he assumed the responsibilities of provincial for the Roman Province of the Salesians of Don Bosco.

From February 1999 to February 2005, he was National Director of Pontifical Mission Societies in Austria (popularly known as Missio). On 15 October 2001, Pope John Paul II appointed him an auxiliary bishop for the Archdiocese of Vienna with the titular see of Simidicca. Schwarz received episcopal ordination on 25 November 2001 by Cardinal Christoph Schönborn at St. Stephen's Cathedral in Vienna. In that capacity, he directed Vienna's Diocesan Office for Mission and Development.

=== Bishop of Linz ===
Schwarz was appointed the Diocesan Bishop of Linz on 6 July 2005 by Pope Benedict XVI; he assumed that office on 18 September.

Schwarz put an end to some of the liberal practices of his predecessor, Maximilian Aichern. He enforced Catholic teaching that prohibited baptisms and preaching by lay people, and was more stringent about norms for the reception of the Eucharist.

One of the biggest challenges Schwarz had to face was the controversy over the nomination of Gerhard Maria Wagner as auxiliary bishop of the diocese, known for his view that Hurricane Katrina was a punishment for New Orleans' sins. Wagner's selection by the Congregation for Bishops - with Schwarz's support - was rejected by many of the liberal deans in Austria. Wagner eventually turned down the appointment, after 2 weeks where the number of people leaving the Church quadrupled in his Linz congregation, with similar or even higher numbers in the neighbouring communities, many of the ex-parishioners naming Wagner's appointment as the reason for their departure.

His retirement was accepted on 18 November 2015 and thus Schwarz was the Bishop Emeritus of Linz.

== Retirement ==
After his retirement, Bishop Schwarz lived with the Don Bosco Sisters in Vöcklabruck for almost ten years; he carried out light duties including visiting the sick, celebrating confirmations across the country and other assignments. In summer 2024, he retired from his duties there and by 2025 he was living at the senior citizens' centre of the Brothers of Mercy in Kritzendorf.

Catholic Church titles
Preceded by Maximilian Aichern	Bishop of Linz; 2005–2015	Succeeded by Manfred Scheuer
Preceded by Cyprien Mbuka Di Nkuanga	Titular Bishop of Simidicca; 2001–2005	Succeeded by Jean-Marie Charles André Le Vert
Preceded by —	Auxiliary Bishop of Vienna; 2001–2005	Succeeded by —
