= Meloë =

Meloë (Ancient Greek: Μελόη) may refer to:

- Meloë (Isauria)
- Meloë (Lycia)

== See also ==
- Meloe, genus of beetles
