= Anna Wagner =

Austrian supercentenarian (1914–2026)

- Born: Anna Salzmann; 6 June 1914; Euratsfeld, Cisleithania, Austria-Hungary
- Died: 12 May 2026 (aged 111); Euratsfeld, Lower Austria, Austria
- Other name: Anna Offenberger
- Known for: Oldest living person in the Germanosphere (17 January 2025 – 12 May 2026)
- Political party: Austrian People's Party
- Children: 1

Anna Wagner (née Salzmann and later Offenberger; 6 June 1914 – 12 May 2026) was an Austrian supercentenarian. She was the oldest person living in a German-speaking country from 17 January 2025 until her death.

== Biography ==
Anna Wagner was born on 6 June 1914, just before the beginning of World War I. She was born in the market town of Euratsfeld in the district of Amstetten, as the illegitimate daughter of the unmarried daughter of master bricklayer Amalia Salzmann (born 8 July 1882 in Euratsfeld; died 6 May 1933 in Amstetten). She was baptized on 8 June 1914. The farmer Augustin Offenberger (born 22 April 1890 in Euratsfeld), only acknowledged his paternity in later years and was subsequently recorded in his daughter's baptismal register (where her first name was spelled August). On 2 June 1923, Anna Wagner was confirmed in the Mostviertel municipality of Viehdorf. A few months earlier, on 12 February 1923, her mother had married August Offenberger, a postman, in Oberndorf an der Melk.

Wagner grew up with her younger sister Amalia (born 13 June 1923; died 14 September 2005) on a small farm in Euratsfeld, where she lived until her death. After attending the Euratsfeld elementary school for eight years, she transferred to a domestic science school in Amstetten, which she travelled to daily by bicycle and where she completed her schooling. Afterwards, she worked as a farmer.

Her mother died of sepsis on 6 May 1933 at the age of 50 and was buried in the Euratsfeld Cemetery on 8 May 1933:

A mother's heart stopped beating unexpectedly quickly. Mrs. Amalia Offenberger was transferred to the Amstetten hospital about 14 days ago; on Sunday, May 7th, during the Mother's Day celebrations, the hearse brought her back. On Monday, May 8th, she was laid to rest.

— – Note in the St. Pölten newspaper of 18 May 1933

On 28 May 1951, Anna married Franz Wagner in a civil ceremony in Amstetten and in a church ceremony at the pilgrimage church of Maria Taferl, and took his surname. With her husband, who predeceased her, she had a daughter named Margarete and a granddaughter.

She retired in the early 1980s. Until she was over 90 years old, she undertook several trips abroad each year. At the age of 90, she boarded a plane for the first time in her life for a trip to Lourdes. Even at 100, she met regularly with a group of Euratsfeld residents over 80 and participated in an annual excursion. Wagner was an active member of the Lower Austrian People's Party and organized several trips for the Austrian Senior Citizens' Association. She was reportedly the oldest member of the Lower Austrian People's Party.

After Margarete Tröstl, Anna Wagner was the second oldest person living in Austria. With her 110th birthday in June 2024, Wagner became a supercentenarian. In an interview on her 110th birthday, she attributed her longevity to her decidedly positive outlook on life and her decades of physical activity. From the death of Margarete Tröstl on 17 January 2025, Wagner, who was confined to a wheelchair in her later years, was the oldest person living in Austria and in a German-speaking country.

Wagner died on 12 May 2026, at the age of 111 years and 340 days in the house where she had spent almost her entire life.
