= Catholic Church in Liechtenstein =

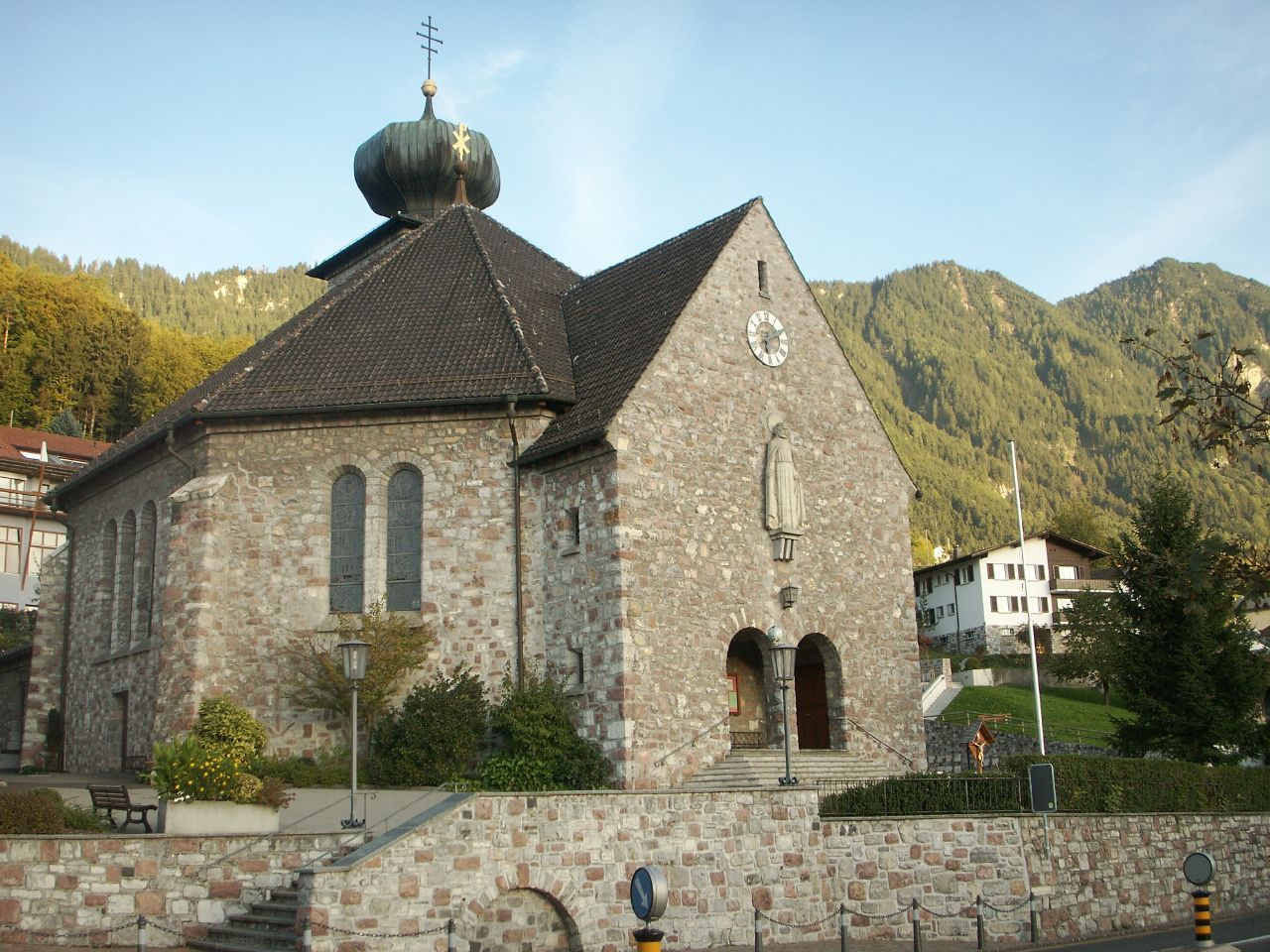
St Joseph's Parish Church, Triesenberg

The Catholic Church in Liechtenstein is part of the worldwide Catholic Church, under the spiritual leadership of the Pope in Rome. The Catholic Church is the official state religion of Liechtenstein in accordance with its constitution. Prior to 1997, the principality was part of the Swiss Diocese of Chur. In 1997, the Archdiocese of Vaduz was created, encompassing the entire territory of Liechtenstein. The first archbishop was Wolfgang Haas.

== History ==
Historically, all of Liechtenstein was a part of the Swiss Catholic Diocese of Chur with Catholicism being the state church. In 1988, Pope John Paul II appointed Wolfgang Haas as coadjutor bishop of Chur. This was controversial as it was done without following the traditional practice in Chur of the 1948 Etsi salva decree whereby the Chur Cathedral priests chose the bishop from a list of three given by the Holy See. Protests were held at Haas' enthronement, which resulted in him having to enter the cathedral through the back door due to the number of protestors with the choir refusing to take part and no flowers being placed in the cathedral. Due to continuing resentment, the Pope split Liechtenstein off from the Diocese of Chur with the new Diocese of Vaduz being raised to the status of archdiocese with Haas as Archbishop. The Parliament of Liechtenstein passed a motion declaring they wished to remain with Chur and this decision was made without their consent.

In 2011, consideration was made to disestablish the Catholic Church in Lichtenstein. In 2021, Archbishop Haas announced that the Archdiocese of Vaduz would not take part in Pope Francis' global synod, citing their size and created an independent synod.

In 2020, 72% of the population were Catholic. In the same year there were 34 priests and 53 nuns serving 10 parishes.

== See also ==
- Religion in Liechtenstein
