= Wolfgang Haas =

Liechtensteiner Catholic prelate (born 1948)

The Most Reverend Wolfgang Haas
- Archbishop Emeritus of Vaduz
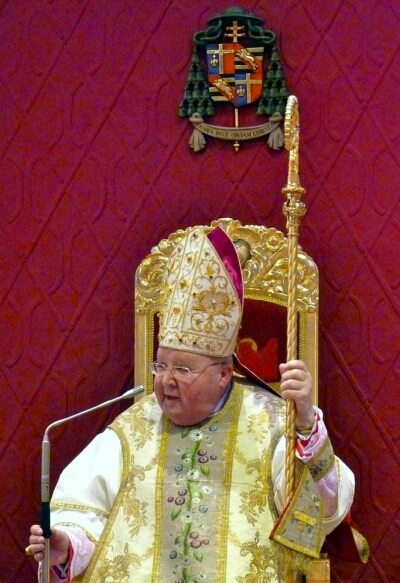
- Haas in 2015
- Archdiocese: Vaduz
- Appointed: 2 December 1997
- Installed: 21 December 1997
- Term ended: 20 September 2023
- Successor: Benno Elbs
- Previous posts: Coadjutor Bishop of Chur (1988–1990); Bishop of Chur (1990–1997)

Orders
- Ordination: 7 April 1974
- Consecration: 22 May 1988 by Johannes Vonderach

Personal details
- Born: 7 August 1948 (age 78) Vaduz, Principality of Liechtenstein
- Denomination: Catholic
- Motto: Maria duce obviam Christo (Latin for 'Under Mary's guidance towards Christ')

Styles of Wolfgang Haas
- Reference style: The Most Reverend
- Spoken style: Your Excellency
- Religious style: Archbishop

Wolfgang Haas (born 7 August 1948) is a Liechtenstein-born prelate of the Catholic Church who was the first archbishop of the newly established Archdiocese of Vaduz in Liechtenstein from 1997 to 2023. He was Bishop of Chur in Switzerland from 1990 to 1997, after two years there as coadjutor.

== Early years ==
Haas was born in Vaduz on 7 August 1948. He lived with his family in Mauren until he moved to Schaan, where his family ran a ceramics business. He graduated from the Collegium Marianum in Liechtenstein in 1968 and then studied philosophy and theology at the University of Fribourg in Switzerland. He was ordained a priest and incardinated in Chur, Switzerland, on 7 April 1974. While working as an assistant in dogmatics at the theological faculty at the University of Fribourg, he earned his licentiate in theology in 1974. From 1975 to 1978 he studied at the Pontifical Gregorian University in Rome. He was named chancellor of the Diocese of Chur in 1978 and joined its diocesan court in 1982.

== Bishop of Chur ==
Pope John Paul II appointed him coadjutor bishop of Chur–a diocese that covers several Swiss cantons and includes Zurich–on 25 March 1988, disregarding the traditional right of the canons of Chur to select their bishop from three candidates proposed by the Holy See. (Note: Pope Pius XII confirmed this right in the 1948 decree Etsi salva.) Many Catholics in Chur rejected Haas for his conservative positions and what they considered his irregular appointment.

Haas received his episcopal consecration on 22 May 1988 from the bishop of Chur, Johannes Vonderach. The invitation-only ceremony was held in the cathedral but not open to the public. Invitees had to step over demonstrators, organized by theology students and priests, who lay on the ground in front of the entrance. The bishop of Basel, Otto Wüst, and 11 of the cathedral's 24 canons and a variety of other church officials did not attend. Haas succeeded as bishop when Pope John Paul accepted Vonderach's resignation on 22 May 1990. A group of about 7,000 Catholics attempted to deny Haas entry into the cathedral when he took possession of the see on 17 June 1990, and he entered by a back entrance. These tensions were never resolved, and Haas never succeeded in reconciling the diocese to his appointment. At times some cantons, including Grisons and Zurich, withheld their financial contributions from the diocese.

In 1991, Haas made a series of controversial decisions regarding the local theological college, St Luzi Seminary, allowing only candidates for the priesthood to study there. He replaced the rector and dismissed all students who were not in formation for the priesthood. In response the Synodal Council of the Roman Catholic corporation of the Canton of Zurich cut its funding to the diocese.

In March 1995, the president of the Synodal Council, Eugen Baumgartner, said, "We have been waiting for a long time for the removal of Wolfgang Haas. I simply cannot understand it any more and ask myself how long must we wait for a decision from Rome. If ever there were a bishop who could not unite his diocese, it is Wolfgang Haas." In 1996, Bishop Paul Vollmar, an auxiliary in Chur, said that no resolution of Chur's problems was possible "until we have a change in bishop," and the Swiss Bishops Conference endorsed that view.

Late in his tenure in Chur, Haas appointed three vicars general for the diocese over the objections of the 14 deans of the diocese, puzzling the Vatican by sidelining his auxiliary bishops. (Note: In 1993, the Holy See had named two auxiliary bishops for Chur, Peter Henrici and Paul Vollmar, saying that the purpose was to create "ecclesiastical communion" there. They did not succeed as mediators between Haas and local Catholics. Henrici provided a harsh critique of Haas' appointment and administration in interviews published in 2021, endorsed by Joseph Maria Bonnemain, the recently appointed bishop of Chur.)

== Archbishop of Vaduz ==
On 2 December 1997, Pope John Paul erected the Archdiocese of Vaduz in Liechtenstein, covering territory formerly part of the diocese of Chur, and named Haas its first archbishop. The archdiocese is not part of any national bishops conference and has no suffragan sees. (Note: Comparable jurisdictions are the Archdioceses of Monaco and Luxembourg, capital cities of European Catholic monarchies, although unlike them, the Archdiocese of Vaduz is not a member of the Council of European Bishops' Conferences in Europe.) When erected, Vaduz was among the smallest archdioceses in the world, with just 12 parishes and 23 priests. Some observers believed that Haas' transfer to the new archdiocese had been negotiated by the Apostolic Nuncio to Switzerland and Liechtenstein Archbishop Karl-Josef Rauber and that the archdiocese itself was made to remove him from his previous diocese. Parliament opposed the creation of the archdiocese on a 24 to 1 vote.

Haas took possession of the see on 21 December, but because of his conservative views on Church teaching, there were many protests on the day of his installation, and the Cathedral of St. Florin required a massive security presence. The church had to be sealed off with security checks for entry. The choir refused to participate, and the sacristan provided no flowers. Thousands of protesters also staged a funeral procession around the church. Prince Hans-Adam II of Liechtenstein, who expressed no opinion on the archdiocese or Haas, attended the installation.

Beginning in 2011, because the government of Liechtenstein began considering legislation to end the Catholic Church's official status, to liberalize abortion, and to protect the civil liberties of gays and lesbians, Haas refused to celebrate the traditional outdoor Mass on Liechtenstein's national day. He said that combining the Mass with a state celebration sent "a false or dishonest signal to the public". He called any recognition of same-sex relationships "a scandal".

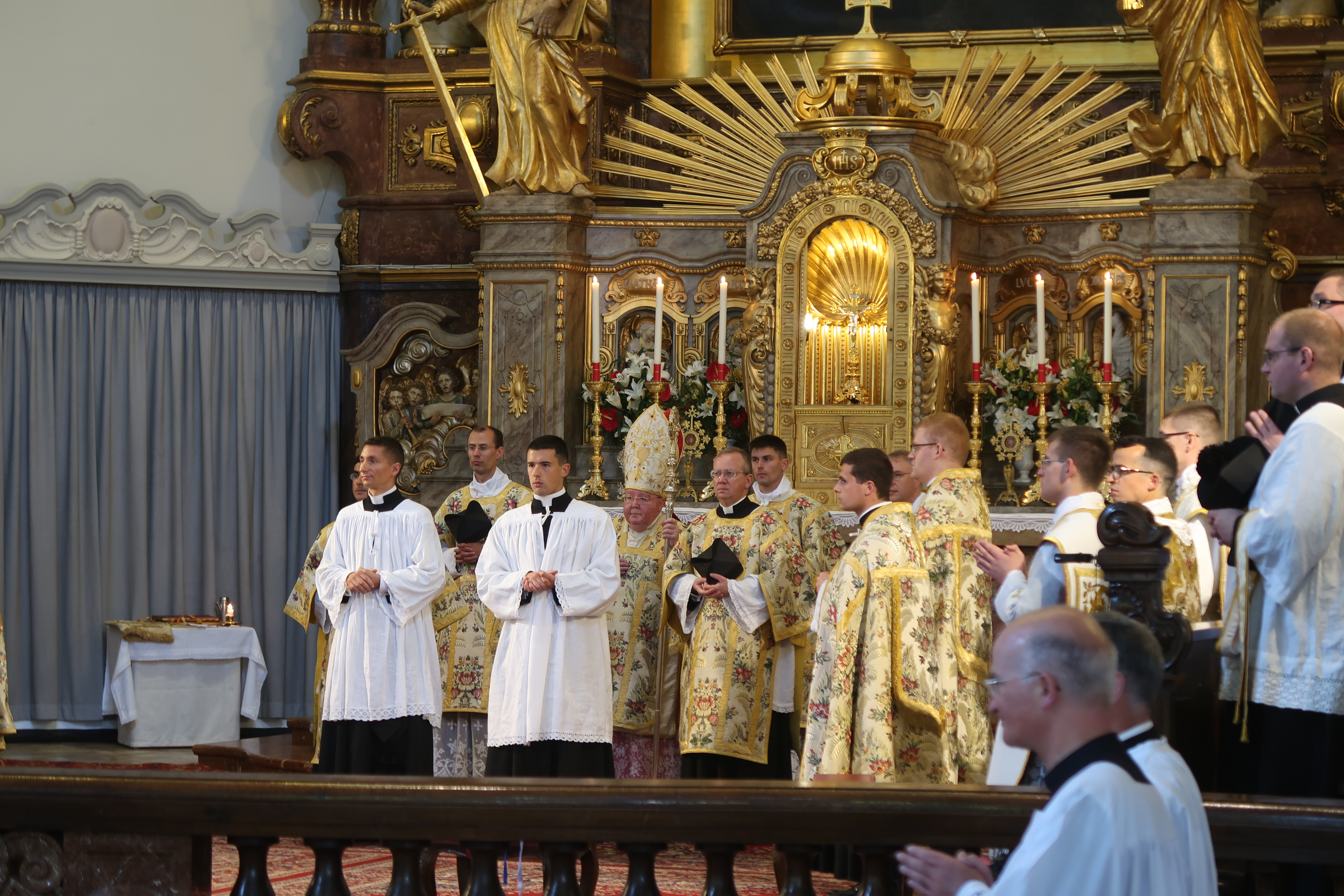
Haas undertaking FSSP ordinations in 2024

In Vaduz, Haas has demonstrated strong support for the Priestly Fraternity of St. Peter (FSSP), frequently ordaining its members. As a result, tensions continue between Haas and non-traditionalist Catholics in Liechtenstein.

He installed a gold episcopal throne in the cathedral at his own expense, and later, at a cost to the archdiocese of 130,000 Swiss francs, three vaults for episcopal tombs in the nave, which proved controversial.

In October 2021, Haas announced that Vaduz would not participate in the Synod on Synodality, the worldwide program of synods inaugurated by Pope Francis, in his archdiocese. He called the process complex and said it might prove ideological. He said communication in the archdiocese was easy and available, and that his listening as a bishop did not require long debates. A local theologian and critic of Haas called this characterization "a pure lie". A local organization of Catholics initiated its own synod instead. In response, some local Catholics formed the Association for an Open Church to conduct their own version of a synod.

In June 2022, Haas refused to participate in the annual confirmation Mass and dinner with local officials in Schaan, because the town was hosting Liechtenstein's first gay pride march the day before.

After parliament passed a motion asking the government to draft legislation to legalize same-sex marriage, Haas announced in December 2022 that he would cancel a Mass traditionally held on New Year's Day at the opening session of parliament. Haas said same-sex marriage "runs counter to natural sensibility, to natural law in accordance with reason and, in particular, to the Christian concept of the human being".

There was speculation that with Haas due to tender his resignation in 2023, the archdiocese might disappear, given that it was created for him and is extremely small, isolated from national bishops' organizations. Hereditary Prince Alois has expressed his hope that the archdiocese continue to exist and criticized Haas' decision to cancel the annual Mass for the opening of parliament. Archbishop Paul Gallagher of the Vatican's Secretariat of State indicated during an April 2023 visit to Vaduz that the archdiocese would continue to exist.

Pope Francis accepted Haas' resignation as archbishop of Vaduz on 20 September 2023, naming Bishop Benno Elbs of Feldkirch, a neighboring diocese in Austria, as apostolic administrator of Vaduz. Haas has announced he will not speak to the media and plans to retire to the monastery of Schellenberg in Liechtenstein.

== See also ==
- Catholic Church in Liechtenstein
