= Feldkirch Cathedral =

Coordinates: 47°14′17″N 9°35′54″E

- Cathedral of St Nicholas, Feldkirch
- Dom Sankt Nikolaus in Feldkirch
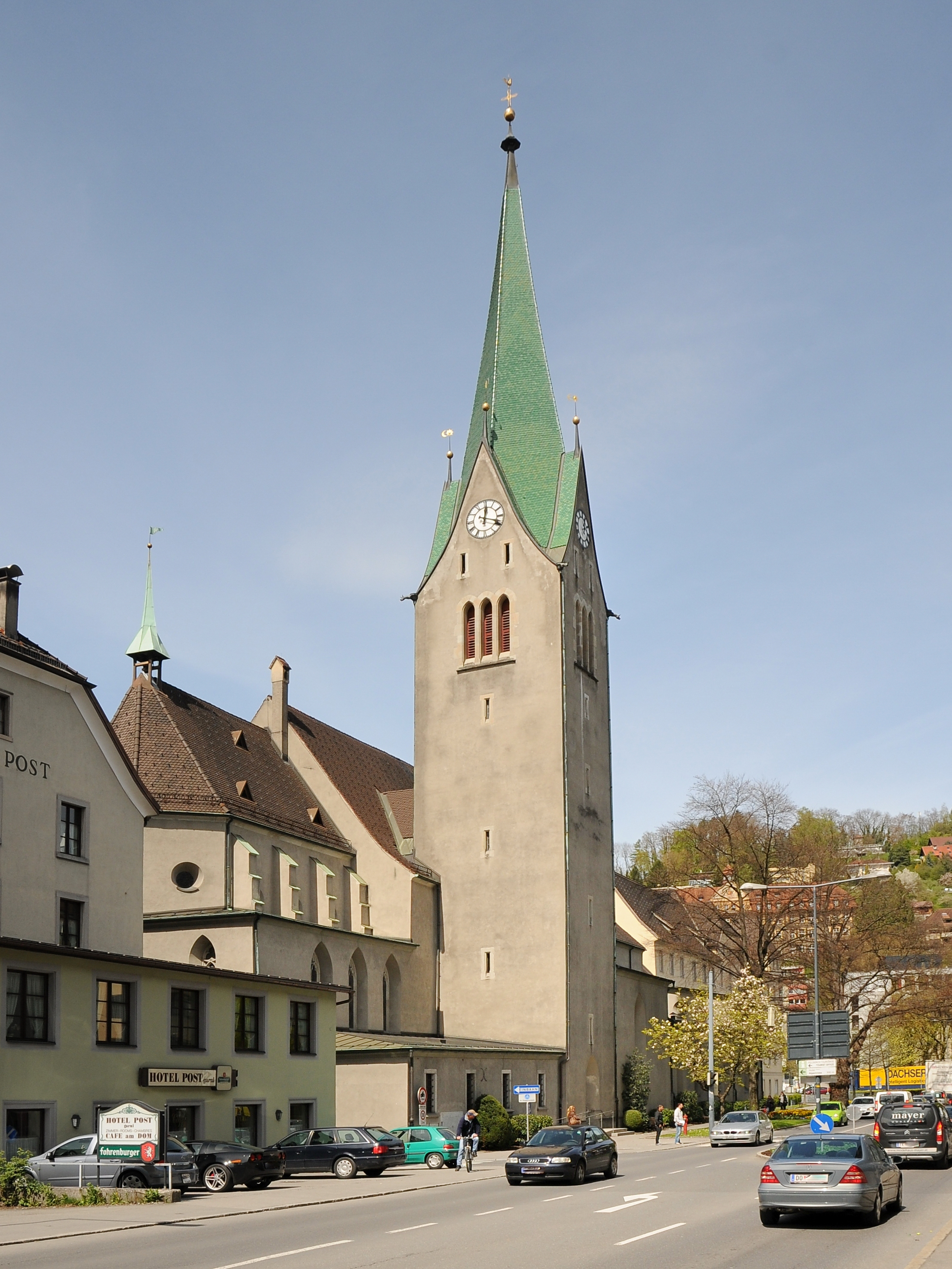
- Location: Feldkirch
- Country: Austria
- Denomination: Roman Catholic Church

Feldkirch Cathedral (German: Dompfarrkirche St. Nikolaus) is a Roman Catholic cathedral dedicated to Saint Nicholas in the city of Feldkirch, Vorarlberg, Austria. It is part of the old town and is the largest Gothic church in Vorarlberg. It has been the cathedral of the Diocese of Feldkirch since it was established in 1968.

== History and description ==
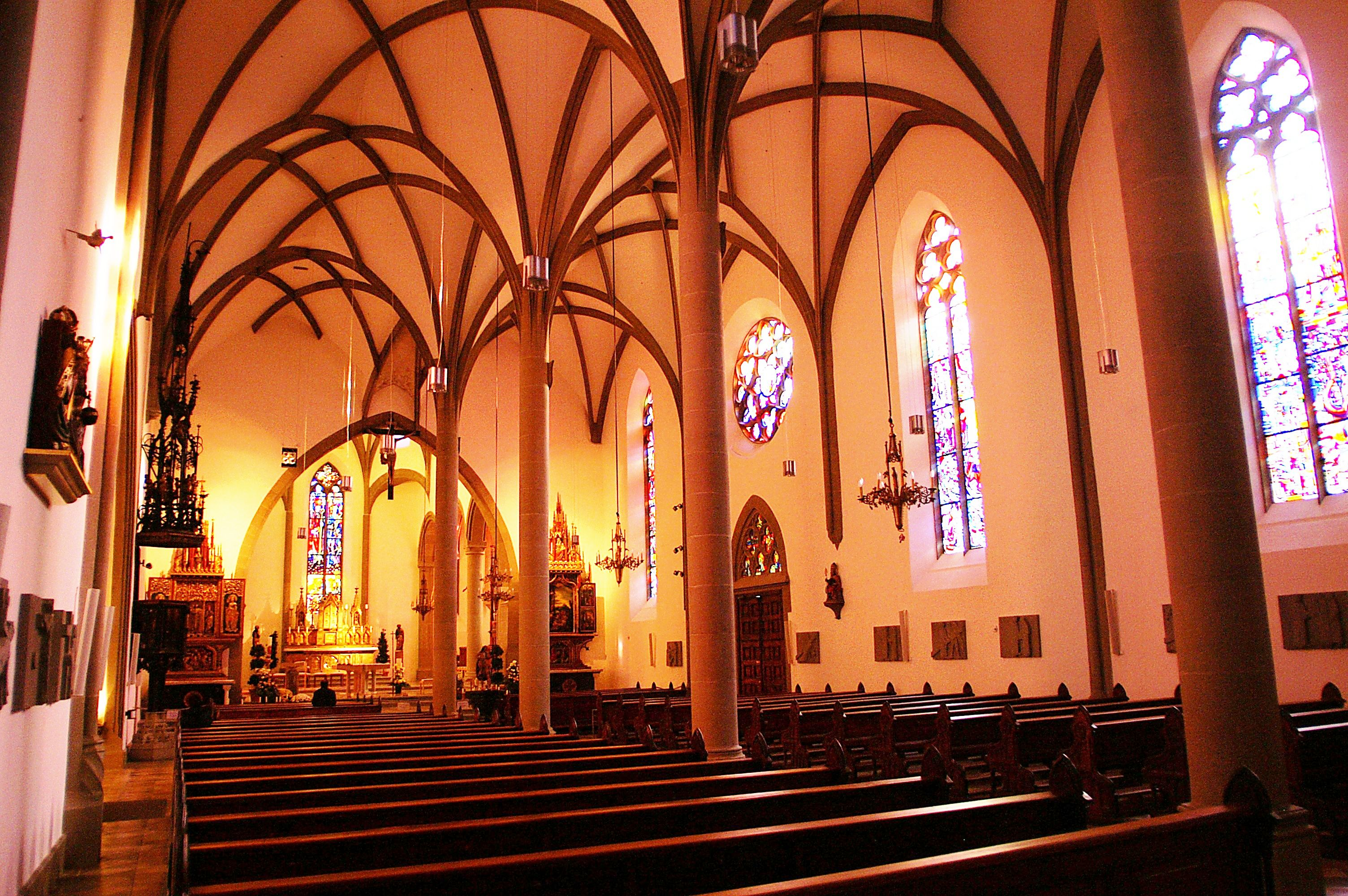
Interior view

The first church on the site was a chapelry of one of two older churches (St Petronilla's in Rankweil or St Peter's in Altenstadt); it was probably built around the same time as the Schattenburg and the beginnings of the present town of Feldkirch, which is to say, around 1200. It became an independent parish church in 1218. The dedication to Saint Nicholas dates from 1287.

In the city fires of 1348, 1396 and 1460 the original Romanesque church building was badly damaged. In 1478 it was rebuilt under the architect Hans Sturm, who added a new Late Gothic nave and gable roof; the new building was dedicated in the same year. In 1479 the church tower to the north was completed. The present choir was built around 1520 with a somewhat lower gable roof. There are also sacristies, a Lady Chapel and a baptismal chapel, both with monopitch roofs.
