= Maximilian Aichern =

Austrian Roman Catholic bishop (1932–2026)

His Excellency Maximilian Aichern
- Bishop Emeritus of Linz
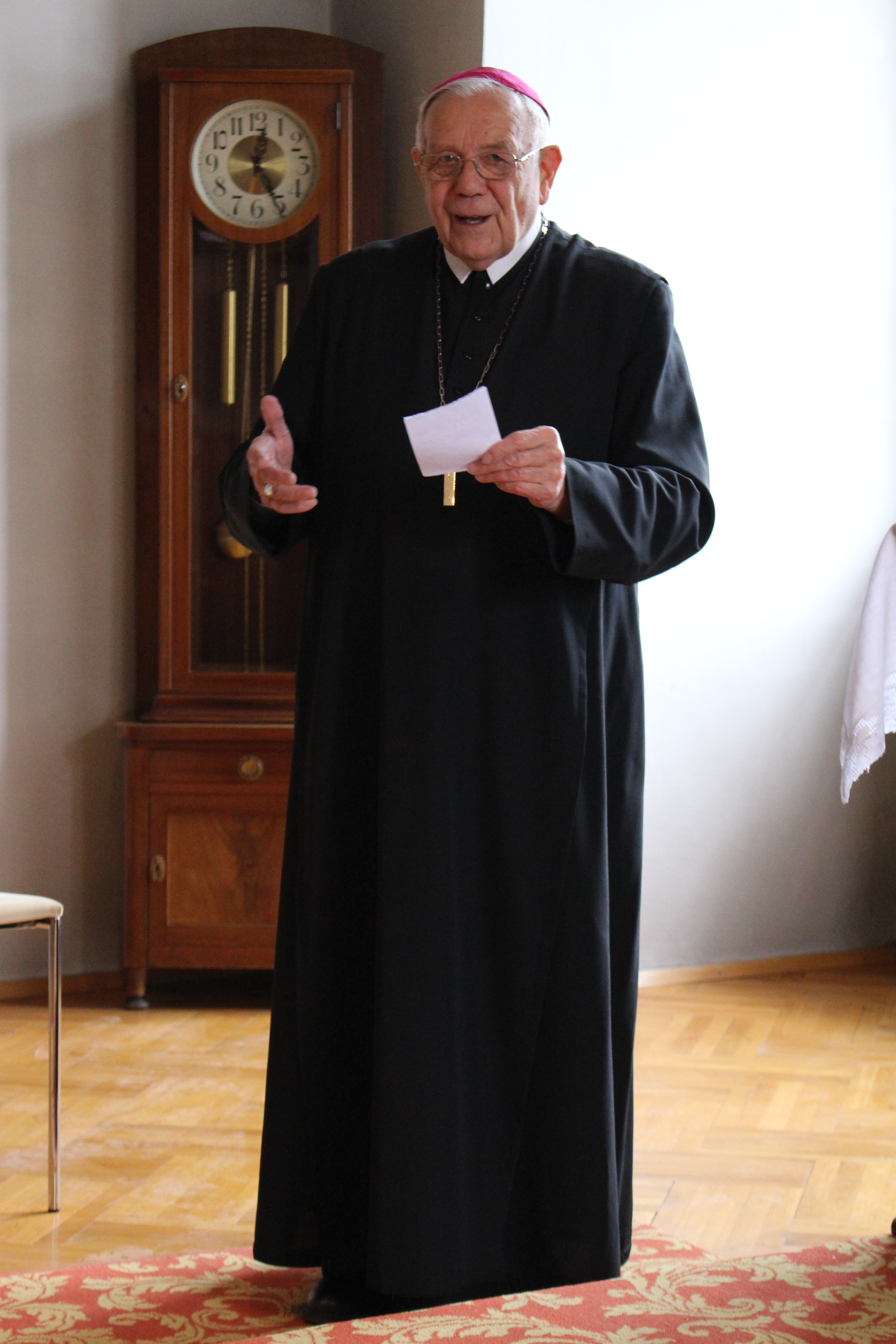
- Aichern in 2020
- Archdiocese: Vienna
- Diocese: Linz
- Appointed: 15 December 1981
- Term ended: 18 May 2005
- Predecessor: Franz Zauner
- Successor: Ludwig Schwarz

Orders
- Ordination: 9 July 1959
- Consecration: 17 January 1982 by Franz König, Franz Zauner and Alois Wagner

Personal details
- Born: 26 December 1932 Vienna, Austria
- Died: 31 January 2026 (aged 93) Linz, Upper Austria, Austria
- Motto: In caritate servire
- Coat of arms

Styles of Maximilian Aichern
- Reference style: His Excellency; The Most Reverend
- Spoken style: Your Excellency
- Religious style: Bishop

Maximilian Aichern OSB (26 December 1932 – 31 January 2026) was an Austrian Catholic bishop who was the ordinary of the diocese of Linz from 1982 to 2005.

== Biography ==
Aichern was born in Vienna on 26 December 1932, to Max (died 1980) and Franziska (died 1998) Aicher. He attended grammar school and graduated there in 1951 school respectively. In 1954, he joined St. Lambert's Abbey, a Benedictine Monastery in Styria. He subsequently studied in Salzburg and Pontifical Athenaeum Sant'Anselmo in Rome.

He was ordained in 1959 and was initially chaplain in St. Lambert's and religion teacher in the local vocational school in Murau. In 1964, he became abbot coadjutor and from 24 February 1977 until 16 January 1982, he was Abbot of St. Lambert's. From 1978 to 1981 he was also Abbot President of the Austrian Benedictine Congregation.

In May 1981, he was informed that he was nominated as Bishop of Linz. Aichen rejected this office several times and only gave its approval in December. On 15 December 1981 the Pope appointed him official successor of Franz Zauner. Cardinal Franz König gave him the episcopal consecration in the Conception Cathedral in Linz on 17 January 1982.

His motto was: "In caritate servire" (in English: To serve in love). He was considered a "social Bishop of Austria." Within the Episcopal Conference, he was responsible for social and political issues. The working world or the Sunday rest were particular concerns for him. Under his leadership in 1990, the bishops drafted a Social pastoral letter of the Catholic bishops of Austria. Also he was involved in drafting a document on the social word of the Ecumenical Council of Churches in Austria, which was published in 2003.

In the first ten years after his inauguration, he visited all 485 official parishes of the diocese as a bishop. In 2005, he surprisingly announced his resignation for reasons of age, which on 18 May Pope Benedict XVI accepted. Thereafter, he remained at the request of the Pope for the inauguration of his successor Ludwig Schwarz.

Aichern died in Linz on 31 January 2026, at the age of 93.

== Criticism ==
Groups within the diocese of Linz criticized the bishop for allegedly violating liturgical norms set forth by the Holy See. They complained about him in Rome.

== Works ==
- Churches and chapels in the parishes of the Diocese of Linz. An artistic, historical and pastoral documentation. Bischöfl. Ordinariate, Linz 2001, ISBN 3-902195-00-2

== Awards ==
- 2005 Great Golden Medal of Upper Austria
- 2008 Erwin-Wenzl Award: Honorary Award for Lifetime Achievement

== Literature ==
- Christine Haiden:Maximilianstraße Aichen. Bishop with the people. Trauner, Linz 2005, ISBN 3-85487-847-8
- Peter Hofer:Attentive solidarity. Festschrift for Bishop Maximilian Aichen the seventieth birthday. Pustet, Regensburg 2002, ISBN 3-7917-1846-0

Catholic Church titles
Preceded by Franz Zauner	Bishop of Linz; 1981–2005	Succeeded by Ludwig Schwarz
