= Diocese of Innsbruck =

Catholic ecclesiastical territory

Coordinates: 47.2694°N 11.3942°E

Diocese of Innsbruck Dioecesis Oenipontanus Diözese Innsbruck

Catholic
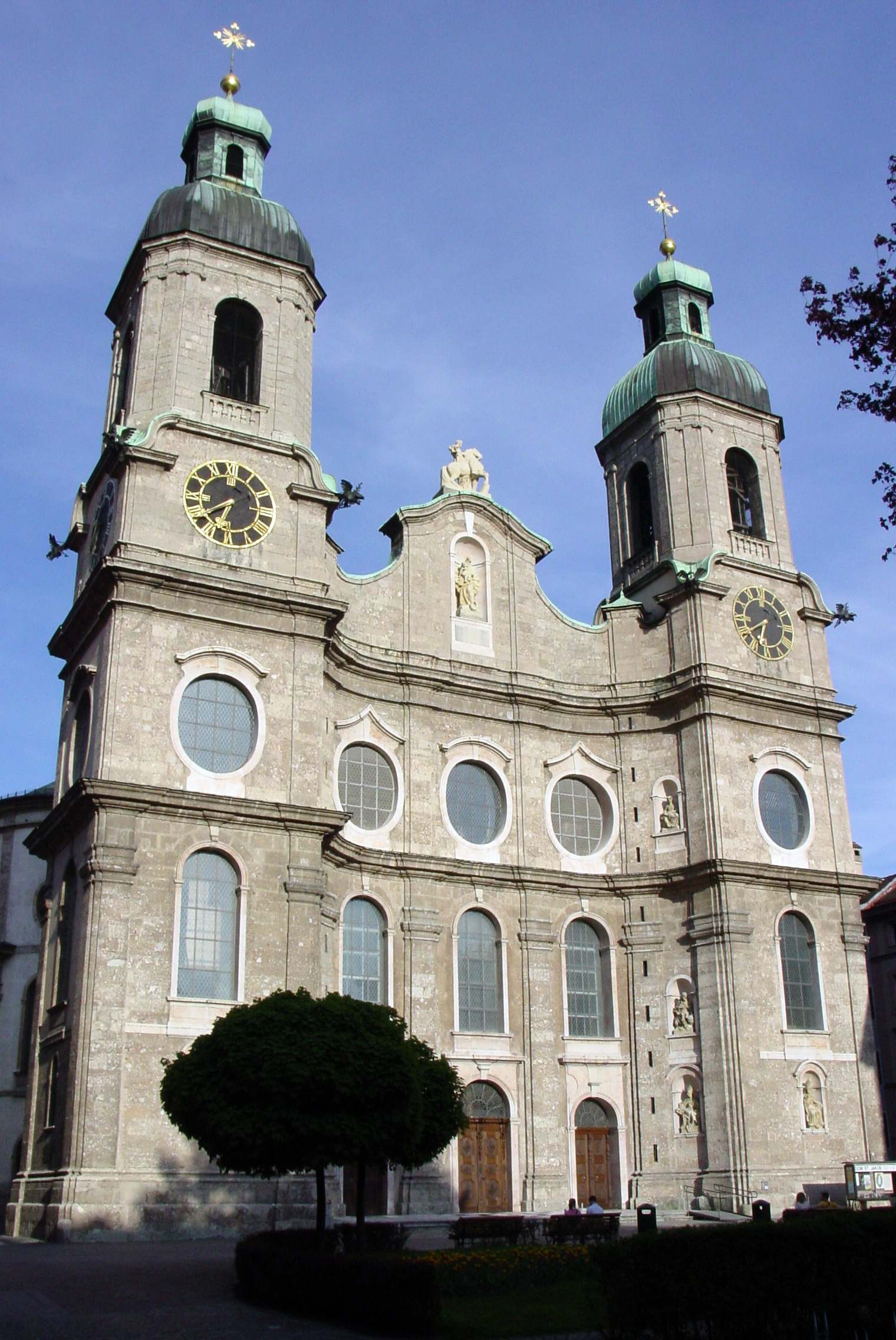
- Innsbruck Cathedral

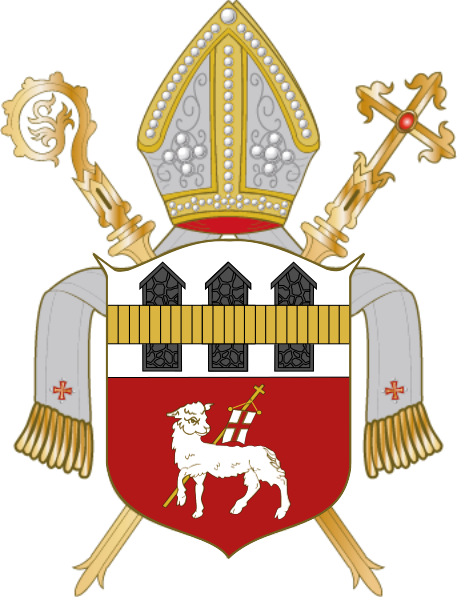
- Coat of arms

Location
- Country: Austria
- Territory: Tyrol
- Ecclesiastical province: Salzburg
- Metropolitan: Archdiocese of Salzburg

Statistics
- Area: 9,845 km^{2} (3,801 sq mi)
- Population: Total; Catholics: (as of 2019); 570,120; 378,373 (66.4%)

Information
- Denomination: Roman Catholic
- Rite: Roman Rite
- Established: December 8, 1968
- Cathedral: Cathedral of St James
- Patron saint: Saint Peter Canisius

Current leadership
- Pope: Leo XIV
- Bishop: Hermann Glettler
- Metropolitan Archbishop: Franz Lackner

Map
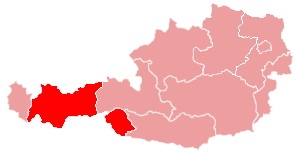

Website
- Website of the Diocese

The Diocese of Innsbruck (Latin: Dioecesis Oenipontanus) is a Latin Church suffragan diocese in the ecclesiastical province of the Metropolitan of Salzburg (in western Austria) of the Catholic Church, covering most of the Bundesland (state) Tyrol.

Its cathedral episcopal see is the Innsbruck Cathedral, dedicated to Saint James, in the city of Innsbruck.

It also has four Minor basilicas: Herz-Jesu-Basilika, dedicated to the Sacred Heart of Jesus, in Hall in Tirol; St. Michael, in Absam; Unsere Liebe Frau von der Unbefleckten Empfängnis, Immaculate Conception, in Wilten and Zisterzienserkirche, Cistercian monastery in Stams.

== History ==
- Established on 11 December 1925 as Apostolic Administration of Innsbruck – Feldkirch, on territory split off from Diocese of Brixen
- 6 August 1964: Promoted as Diocese of Innsbruck – Feldkirch
- 8 December 1968: Renamed as Diocese of Innsbruck / Œnipontan(us) (Latin), having lost territory to establish Diocese of Feldkirch
- It enjoyed a Papal visit from Pope John Paul II in June 1988.

== Statistics ==
As per 2014, it pastorally served 395,490 Catholics (72.8% of 543,173 total) on 9,845 km^{2} in 243 parishes and 49 missions with 344 priests (193 diocesan, 151 religious), 64 deacons, 803 lay religious (246 brothers, 557 sisters) and 6 seminarians.

== Episcopal Ordinaries ==
(al Roman rite)

Apostolic Administrators of Innsbruck – Feldkirch

- Sigismund Waitz (born Italy) (1921–1938), Titular Bishop of Cibyra (1913.05.09 – 1934.12.17), previously Auxiliary Bishop of Diocese of Brixen (Italy) (1913.05.09 – 1934.12.17); later Metropolitan Archbishop of Salzburg (Austria) ([1934.12.10] 1934.12.17 – death 1941.10.30)
  - Auxiliary Bishop: Franz Tschann (born Italy) (1936.08.08 – retired 1955.10.01), Titular Bishop of Panium (1936.08.08 – death 1956.10.10)
- Paulus Rusch (1938.10.15 – 1964.08.06 see below) (born Germany), Titular Bishop of Lycopolis (1938.10.15 – 1947.12.09); next Titular Bishop of Meloë in Isauria (1947.12.09 – 1964.09.26)
  - Auxiliary Bishop: Bruno Wechner (1954.12.31 – 1968.12.09), Titular Bishop of Cartennæ (1954.12.31 – 1968.12.09); later first Bishop of daughter see Feldkirch (Austria) (1968.12.09 – retired 1989.01.21), died 1999

Suffragan Bishops of Innsbruck

- Paulus Rusch (see above 1964.08.06 – death 1980.08.13)
- Reinhold Stecher (1980.12.15 – retired 1997.10.10), died 2013
- Alois Kothgasser, Salesians (S.D.B.) (1997.10.10 – 2002.11.27), next Metropolitan Archbishop of Salzburg (Austria) (2002.11.27 – retired 2013.11.04)
- Manfred Scheuer (2003.10.21 – 2015.11.18), next Bishop of Linz (Austria) (2015.11.18 – ...)
- Hermann Glettler (appointed 2017.09.27)

== See also ==
- List of Catholic dioceses in Austria
- Roman Catholicism in Austria

== Sources and external links ==
- GCatholic.org - data for all sections
- Diocese website
- Catholic Hierarchy
