= Diocese of Feldkirch =

Catholic ecclesiastical territory

Coordinates: 47.2381°N 9.5982°E

Diocese of Feldkirch Dioecesis Campitemplensis Diözese Feldkirch

Catholic
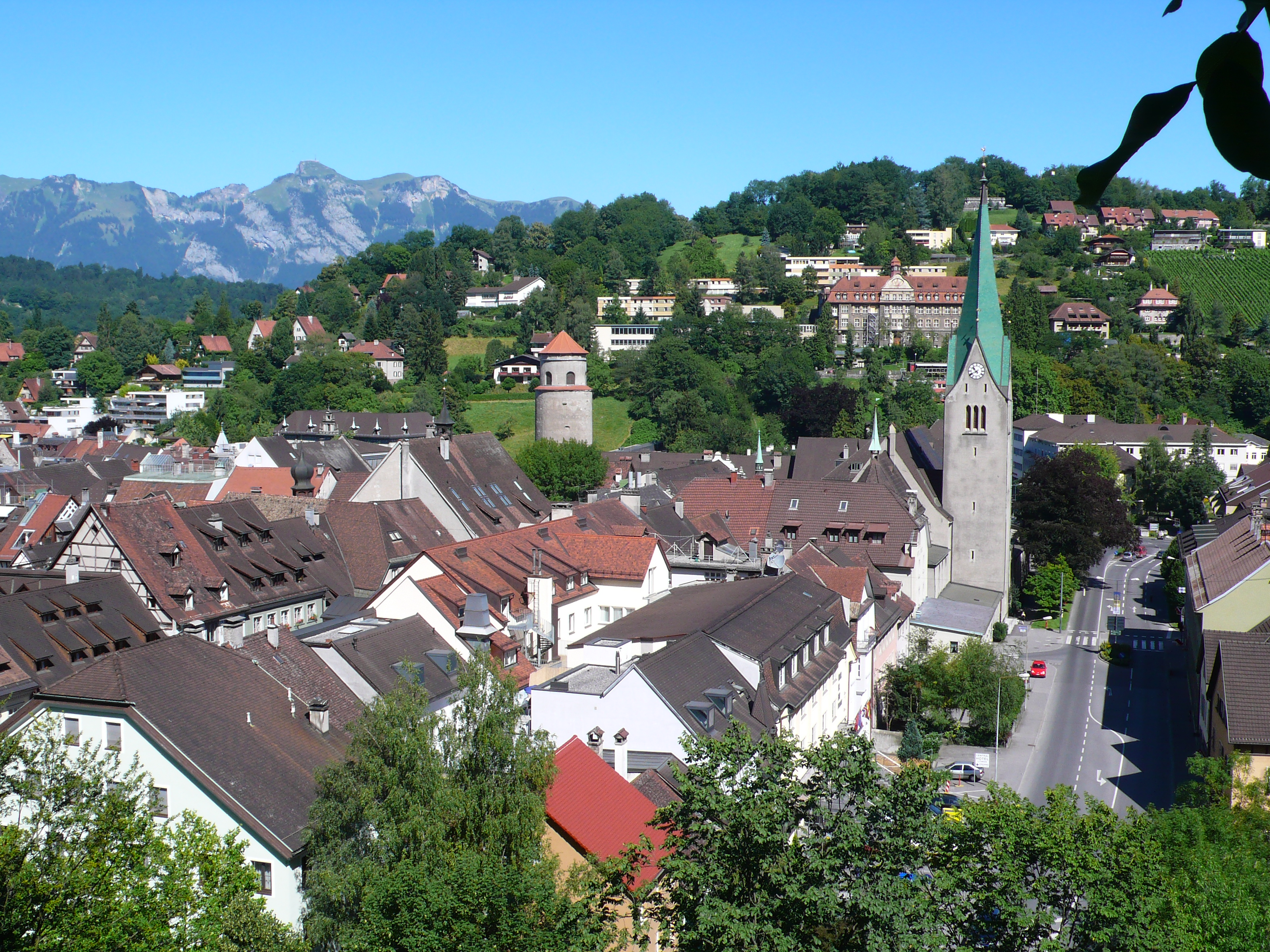
- Feldkirch Cathedral

Location
- Country: Austria
- Territory: Vorarlberg
- Ecclesiastical province: Salzburg
- Metropolitan: Archdiocese of Salzburg

Statistics
- Area: 2,601 km^{2} (1,004 sq mi)
- Population: Total; Catholics: (as of 2019); 395,012; 233,081 (59%)

Information
- Denomination: Roman Catholic
- Rite: Roman Rite
- Established: 8 December 1968
- Cathedral: St. Nicholas Cathedral, Feldkirch
- Patron saint: Saint Nicholas

Current leadership
- Pope: Leo XIV
- Bishop: Benno Elbs
- Metropolitan Archbishop: Franz Lackner

Map
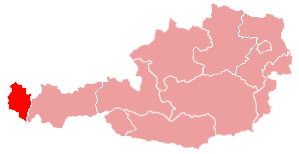

Website
- Website of the Diocese

The Diocese of Feldkirch (Latin: Dioecesis Campitemplensis) is a Latin Church diocese located in the city of Feldkirch, Vorarlberg, in the ecclesiastical province of Salzburg in Austria.

== History ==
- until the 19th century: part of the Swabian Dioceses of the Catholic Church: Constance, Augsburg
- then attached to the (Tyrolean and thus Austrian) Diocese of Brixen after the split-up of the Holy Roman Empire
- came with the Austrian part of Brixen to the Apostolic Administrature (1921), later (1964) Diocese of Innsbruck-Feldkirch
- 8 December 1968: detached from Innsbruck and established as Diocese of Feldkirch

== Special churches ==
- Minor Basilicas:
  - Liebfrauenbasilika Rankweil, Rankweil, Vorarlberg

== Bishops of Feldkirch ==
- Bruno Wechner (9 December 1968 – 21 January 1989)
- Klaus Küng (21 January 1989 – 7 October 2004)
- Elmar Fischer (24 May 2005 – 15 November 2011)
- Benno Elbs (since 8 May 2013)

== See also ==
- Roman Catholicism in Austria
