= Christine Haiden =

Austrian journalist and editor (born 1962)

Christine Haiden (born 2 March 1962, in Euratsfeld, Lower Austria) is an Austrian journalist since the 1980s. In 1993 she became editor-in-chief of the magazine Welt der Frauen and is well known as a columnist for the Oberösterreichische Nachrichten.

Christine studied law at Johannes Kepler University in Linz. She was named manager of the year in 2008 in Upper Austria and received the Eduard Ploier Journalism Prize in 2013. Christine Haiden is the author of several books and is currently working on two new publications. She is also a valued presenter. Since 2007 she has also been president of the Upper Austrian Press Club.
