= Benno Elbs =

Bishop of the Catholic Church (born 1960)

The Most Reverend Benno Elbs
- Bishop of Feldkirch; Apostolic Administrator of the Archdiocese of Vaduz
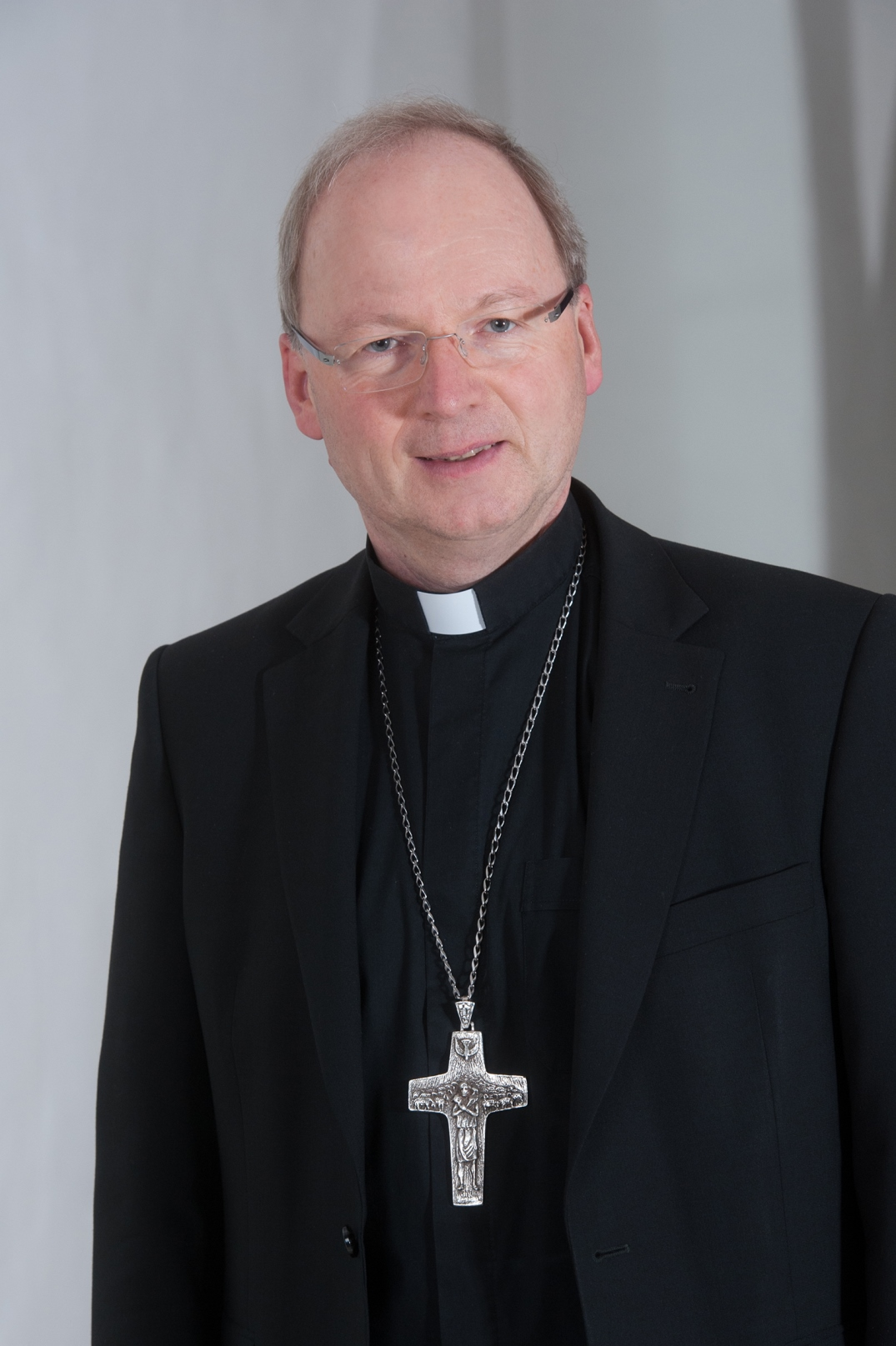
- Elbs in 2015
- Church: Latin Church
- Archdiocese: Vaduz (as apostolic administrator)
- Diocese: Feldkirch
- Installed: 20 September 2023
- Predecessor: Wolfgang Haas (for Vaduz)

Orders
- Ordination: 16 May 1986
- Consecration: 30 June 2013

Personal details
- Born: 16 October 1960 (age 65) Bregenz, Austria
- Denomination: Catholic

Benno Elbs (born 16 October 1960) is a Bishop of the Catholic Church who has been the Bishop of the Diocese of Feldkirch since 2013, and since 2023, the apostolic administrator of the Archdiocese of Vaduz.

== Life ==
Elbs was born on 16 October 1960 in Bregenz as the son of farmer Anton Elbs and Olga (née Meusburger). He attended federal gymnasium in the city before studying Catholic theology and psychology in Innsbruck and Paris, obtaining a doctorate in theology in 1986.

He was ordained as a priest on 16 May 1986, and from 1986 to 1989 was a chaplain in the Bregenz-Mariahilf Parish Church. Since 1990, he has been the rector of the Marianum Episcopal Boarding School in Bregenz. From 1994 to 2005 head of the pastoral office of the Diocese of Feldkirch, the vicar general from 2005 to 2011, and then vicar general from 2011 to 2013.

On 30 June 2013, Elbs was consecrated as a bishop of the Diocese of Feldkirch. On the day of the previous archbishop of Vaduz's resignation, Pope Francis appointed Elbs as apostolic administrator of the Archdiocese of Vaduz until a successor is chosen.

Elbs is a member of the Episcopal Conference of Austria, and has published several books on spiritual topics.
