= Euratsfeld =

- Municipality
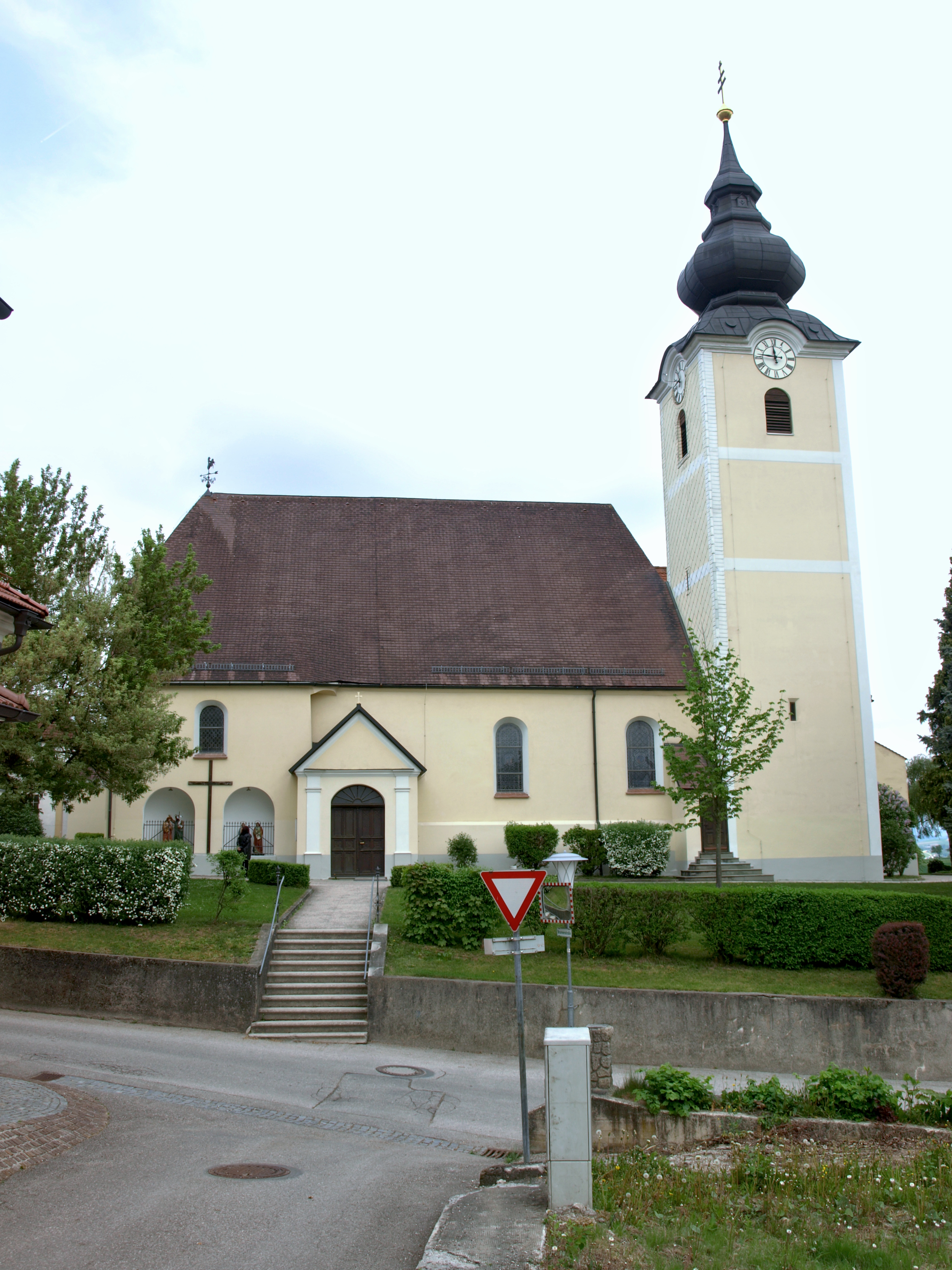
- Saint John's Church in Euratsfeld

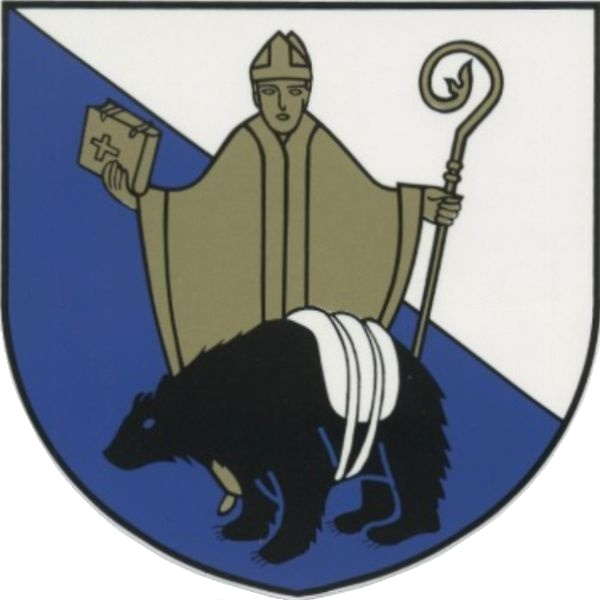
- Coat of arms

- Location within Austria
- Coordinates: 48°5′N 14°56′E
- Country: Austria
- State: Lower Austria
- District: Amstetten

Government
  - Mayor: Johann Weingartner

Area
  - Total: 30.61 km^{2} (11.82 sq mi)
- Elevation: 308 m (1,010 ft)

Population (2018-01-01)
  - Total: 2,639
  - Density: 86.21/km^{2} (223.3/sq mi)
- Time zone: UTC+1 (CET)
  - Summer (DST): UTC+2 (CEST)
- Postal code: 3324
- Area code: 07474
- Website: www.euratsfeld.gv.at

Euratsfeld is a town in the district of Amstetten in Lower Austria in Austria.

== Population ==
Historical population
Year	Pop.	±%
1971	1,771	—
1981	1,840	+3.9%
1991	2,088	+13.5%
2001	2,319	+11.1%

== Notable people ==
- Christine Haiden (born 1962), Austrian journalist, editor and author
- Alois Mock (1934–2017), Austrian politician, Vice-Chancellor of Austria from 1987 to 1989
