= Zacharias Traber =

Austrian physician

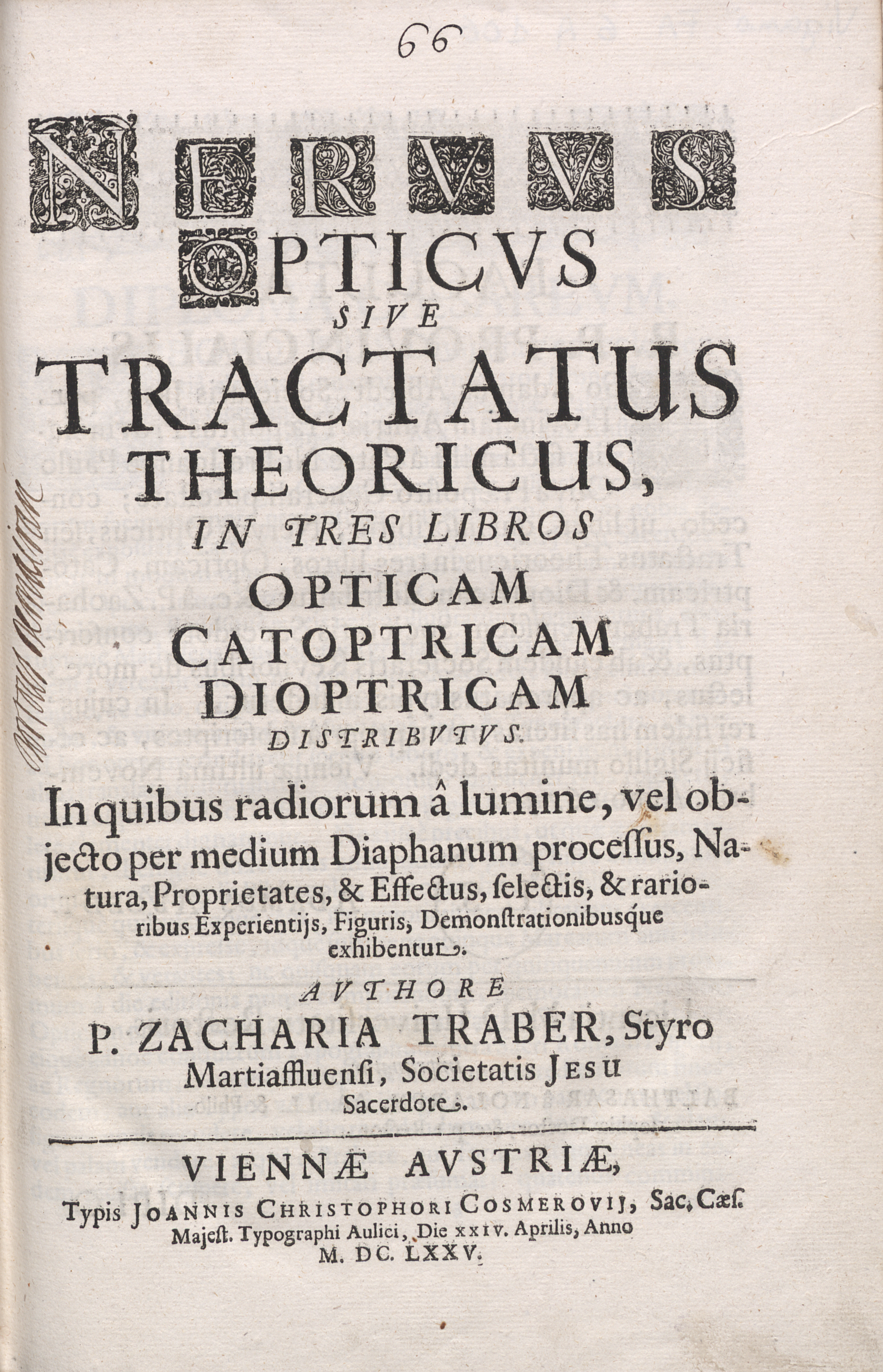
Nervus opticus

Zacharias Traber (1611–1678) was an Austrian Jesuit. He dedicated himself to studies on optics.

== Works ==
- Nervus opticus. Vienna: Johann Christoph Cosmerovius. 1675.
