= Meloë (Isauria) =

Town in ancient Isauria

Coordinates: 36°45′33″N 33°20′59″E

Meloë (Ancient Greek: Μελόη) was a town in ancient Isauria. Meloë is a titular see of the Roman Catholic Church.

Its site is tentatively located near Malya in Anatolia.
