= Franz Lackner =

Austrian prelate (born 1956)

His Excellency Franz Lackner O.F.M.
- Archbishop of Salzburg; Primas Germaniae; President, Austrian Bishops' Conference
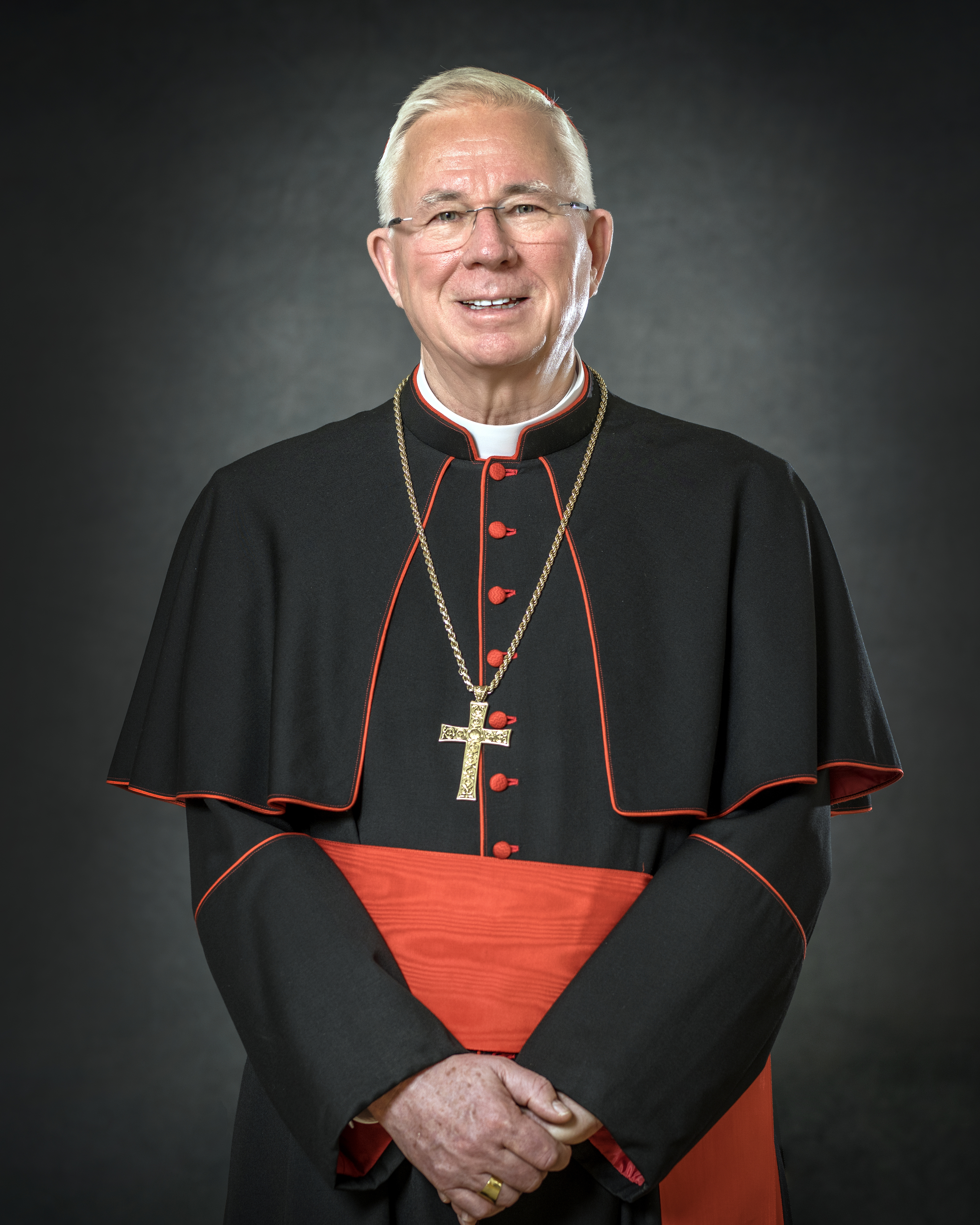
- Church: Roman Catholic
- Archdiocese: Salzburg
- Appointed: 18 November 2013
- Installed: 12 January 2014
- Predecessor: Alois Kothgasser
- Previous post: Auxiliary Bishop of Graz-Seckau (2002-2013)

Orders
- Ordination: 23 June 1991
- Consecration: 8 December 2002 by Egon Kapellari
- Rank: Metropolitan Archbishop

Personal details
- Born: 14 July 1956 (age 70) Feldbach, Styria, Austria
- Motto: Illum Oportet Crescere
- Coat of arms: Franz Lackner's coat of arms

Franz Lackner (born 14 July 1956) is an Austrian prelate who has been Archbishop of Salzburg since 2013. In June 2020 he was elected the president of the Austrian Bishops' Conference.

== Life ==
Franz Lackner was born in Feldbach in the district of Styria. He served as a UN soldier and was stationed in Cyprus.

On 16 September 1984, he became a novice of the Franciscan Order. He was professed as a member of the order on 16 September 1985 while he took his solemn profession on 2 September 1989. On 23 June 1991 Lackner was ordained to the priesthood. After gaining his Masters in Theology Lackner graduated from the Pontifical University Antonianum of the Franciscan order in Rome in philosophy with a dissertation on the subject of "Unity and Multiplicity in Duns Scotus". Subsequently, he was professor of Metaphysics at the Antonianum.

On 7 April 1999, he was elected Provincial of the Franciscan Province in Vienna. In the same year he also became professor of philosophy at the Philosophical-Theological College in Heiligenkreuz, Austria.

On 23 October 2002, he was appointed Auxiliary Bishop of Graz-Seckau and Titular Bishop of Balecium. On 8 December 2002, he was consecrated bishop by the Bishop of Graz-Seckau Egon Kapellari in Graz Cathedral. He choose as his motto Illum oportet crescere. On 8 September 2003, he was appointed Episcopal Vicar for Permanent Deacons, Youth and Vocations. In 2010 he became an honorary member of the K.Ö.St.V. Babenberg Graz and in 2012 an Honorary Member of the K.Ö.St.V. Nibelungia-Knittel.

On 18 November 2013, Lackner was confirmed as Archbishop of Salzburg. He was installed on 12 January 2014, in Salzburg Cathedral. Lackner is the Metropolitan Archbishop of the Ecclesiastical Province of Salzburg. He also has the title of Primas Germaniae ("First Bishop of Germany"). The Archbishop also has the title of Legatus Natus ("born legate") to the Pope, which, although not a cardinal, gives the Archbishop the privilege of wearing red vesture (which is much deeper than a cardinal's scarlet), even in Rome.
