= Primas Germaniae =

Historical title of honor

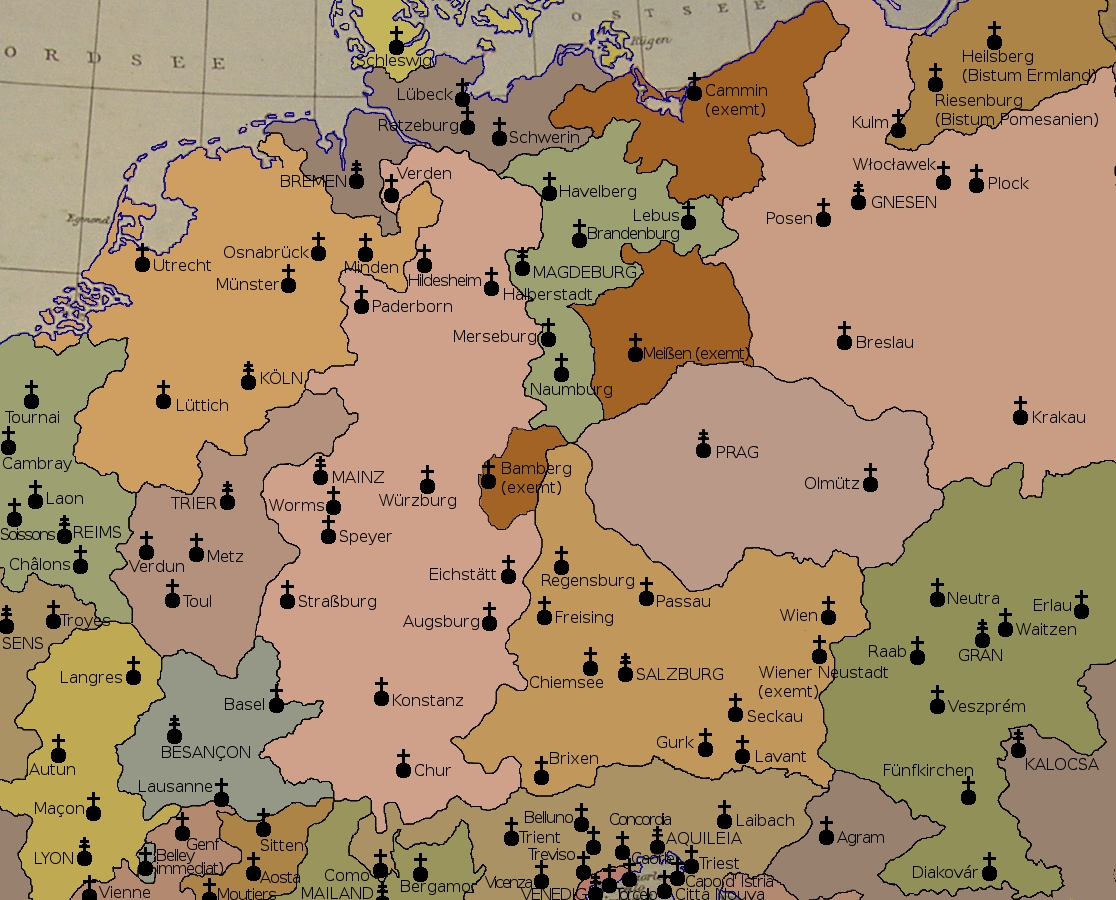
Ecclesiastical provinces (archdioceses) in Central Europe, AD 1500

Primas Germaniae is a historical title of honor for the most important Catholic bishop (the Primate) in the German lands. Throughout the history of the Holy Roman Empire, it was claimed by the Archbishops of Mainz, Trier, Magdeburg and Salzburg alike. Actual prerogatives, however, were exercised by bishops holding the rank of an Apostolic legatus natus. While Mainz, Trier and Magdeburg lost the primatial dignity upon the 1648 Peace of Westphalia and the Napoleonic Secularisation in 1802, the Salzburg archbishops bear the title up to today.

== History ==
A first Concilium Germanicum synod, in order to reform the Germanic bishoprics in the Frankish Kingdom, was summoned by the Anglo-Saxon missionary Boniface in AD 742. When he received the archiepiscopal title and the jurisdiction over the Diocese of Mainz three years later, he tried to establish Mainz as the see of an ecclesiastical province (metropolis), rivalling with the Irish bishop Vergilius of Salzburg. The Mainz bishopric was not elevated to an archdiocese until about 780; nevertheless, Boniface's successors ruled over the largest ecclesiastical province in Germany by far, held the office of a German archchancellor, and also were members of the electoral college voting for the King of the Romans and Emperor-to-be.

Since about 900 the Primas Germaniae title is documented, held by the Archbishops of Mainz as the most important metropolitan bishop and most noble Prince-elector of the Holy Roman Empire, though it was never awarded officially. Several archbishops made successful attempts to obtain the legatus natus title, such as Willigis, Adalbert of Saarbrücken, and Conrad of Wittelsbach. They were, however, not able to enforce any political supremacy.

The Archbishop of Mainz remained primus inter pares of the German Prince-electors and chairman of the council of Prince-electors at the Imperial Diet, holding the right to convoke and to preside over the convent to elect a new emperor. With the German mediatisation and the Final Recess of the Imperial Deputation (Reichsdeputationshauptschluss) of 1803, the Mainz electorate was abolished and its historic dignities were transferred to the newly established Principality of Regensburg, created for the former archbishop Karl Theodor von Dalberg, who retained the Primas Germaniae title until his death in 1817.

The honorary title Primas Germaniae also was held by the most noble ecclesiastical member of the Council of the Princes at the Imperial Diet: first the Archbishop of Magdeburg until the see of Magdeburg was secularized in 1648; thereafter the Archbishop of Salzburg.

== Sources ==
- May, Georg (1995-05-05). "Der Erzbischof von Mainz als Primas". Archiv für katholisches Kirchenrecht. 164 (1): 76–122. doi:10.30965/2589045X-16401005. ISSN 0003-9160.
