= Reinhold Stecher =

Austrian Prelate of the Roman Catholic Church

- Bishop of Diocese of Innsbruck
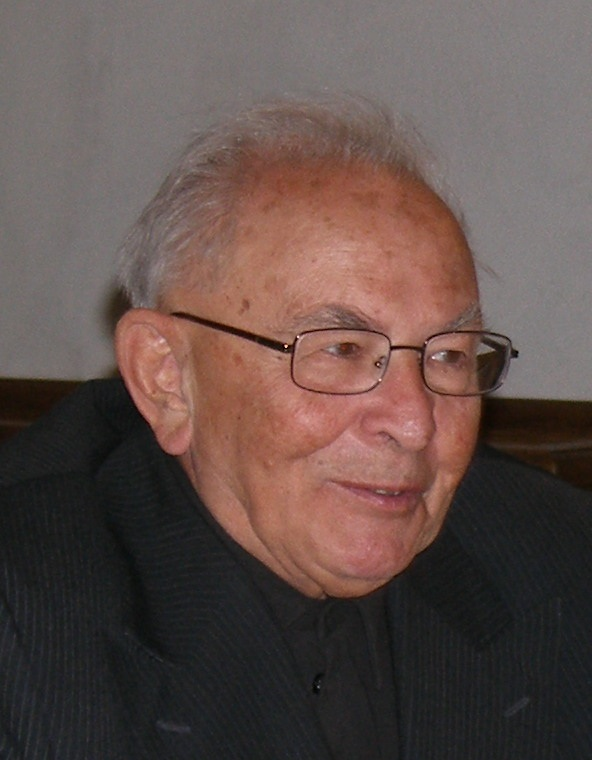
- An Austrian Prelate of the Roman Catholic Church
- Church: Roman Catholic Church
- See: Diocese of Innsbruck
- In office: 1980–1997
- Predecessor: Paulus Rusch
- Successor: Alois Kothgasser
- Previous post(s): Prelate

Orders
- Ordination: 19 December 1947

Personal details
- Born: 22 December 1921; St. Valentin auf der Haide, Italy
- Died: 29 January 2013 (aged 91); Innsbruck, Austria

Reinhold Stecher (22 December 1921 – 29 January 2013) was an Austrian Prelate of the Roman Catholic Church.

Stecher was born in St. Valentin auf der Haide, South Tyrol and was ordained a priest on 19 December 1947. He was appointed bishop of the Diocese of Innsbruck on 15 December 1980 and ordained bishop on 25 January 1981. He retired on 10 October 1997.
