= Demographics of Austria =

- Population pyramid of Austria in 2023
- Population: 9,159,993 (2024 est.)
- Growth rate: 0.32% (2022 est.)
- Birth rate: 8.50 births/1,000 population (2023 est.)
- Death rate: 9.83 deaths/1,000 population (2023 est.)
- Life expectancy: 82.27 years
  - male: 79.44 years
  - female: 85.04 years
- Fertility rate: ▼1.31 children (2024)
- Infant mortality: 3.24 deaths/1,000 live births
- Net migration rate: 3.55 migrant(s)/1,000 population
- Immigrant share: 25.5% (2024)

Nationality
- Nationality: Austrian citizen
- Major ethnic: Austrians (72%)
- Minor ethnic: Germans and other European ethnic groups (23% to 26%); Others, mostly non European ethnic groups (5% to 2%)

Language
- Official: German (official)
- Spoken: Languages of Austria

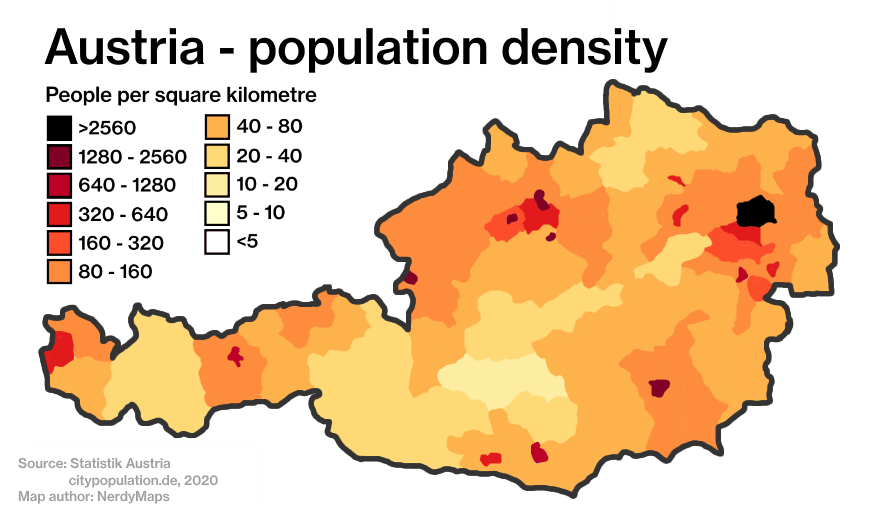
Population density in Austria by district.

Historical population
Year	Pop.	±% p.a.
1780	2,970,000	—
1790	3,046,000	+0.25%
1800	3,064,000	+0.06%
1810	3,054,000	−0.03%
1821	3,202,000	+0.43%
1830	3,476,000	+0.92%
1840	3,649,000	+0.49%
1850	3,879,000	+0.61%
1857	4,075,000	+0.71%
1869	4,497,880	+0.83%
1880	4,963,528	+0.90%
1890	5,417,360	+0.88%
1900	6,003,845	+1.03%
1910	6,648,310	+1.02%
1923	6,534,742	−0.13%
1934	6,760,044	+0.31%
1939	6,652,567	−0.32%
1951	6,933,905	+0.35%
1961	7,073,807	+0.20%
1971	7,491,526	+0.58%
1981	7,555,338	+0.08%
1991	7,795,786	+0.31%
2001	8,032,587	+0.30%
2011	8,401,940	+0.45%
2021	8,969,068	+0.66%
Source: 2019 estimate

Demographic features of the population of Austria include population density, ethnicity, education level, health of the populace, economic status, religious affiliations and other aspects of the population.

According to the 2001 population census, 88.6% are native German speakers (96% Austro-Bavarian language and 4% Alemannic language) while the remaining 11.4% speak several minority languages. The non-German speakers of Austria can be divided into two groups: traditional minorities, who are related to territories formerly part of the Habsburg monarchy, and new minorities, resulting from recent immigration.

Despite a low fertility rate recently making the natural change negative, the Austrian population keeps steadily increasing due to an immigration rate increase compensating for the low amount of births, and by 2023, Austria reached a population of 9 million people.

== Population ==
Demographic statistics according to the World Population Review.

- One birth every 6 minutes
- One death every 6 minutes
- One net migrant every 26 minutes
- Net gain of one person every 26 minutes
View source data.
View source data.
View source data.
View source data.

=== Fertility ===
TFR of Austria to 2016

The total fertility rate is the number of children born per woman. It is based on fairly good data for the entire period in the present-day Hungary. Sources: Our World In Data and Gapminder Foundation.

Total fertility rates in Austria 1870–1899
Year	1870	1871	1872	1873	1874	1875	1876	1877	1878	1879
Rate	4.69	4.65	4.75	4.83	4.8	4.81	4.92	4.72	4.61	4.61
Year	1880	1881	1882	1883	1884	1885	1886	1887	1888	1889
Rate	4.62	4.55	4.56	4.51	4.58	4.49	4.51	4.49	4.43	4.44
Year	1890	1891	1892	1893	1894	1895	1896	1897	1898	1899
Rate	4.24	4.48	4.31	4.36	4.34	4.4	4.4	4.33	4.35	4.35

Total fertility rate

1.48 children born/woman (2018 est.) Country comparison to the world: 199th

Mother's mean age at first birth
29 years (2014 est.)

=== Life expectancy ===
Life expectancy in Austria since 1870

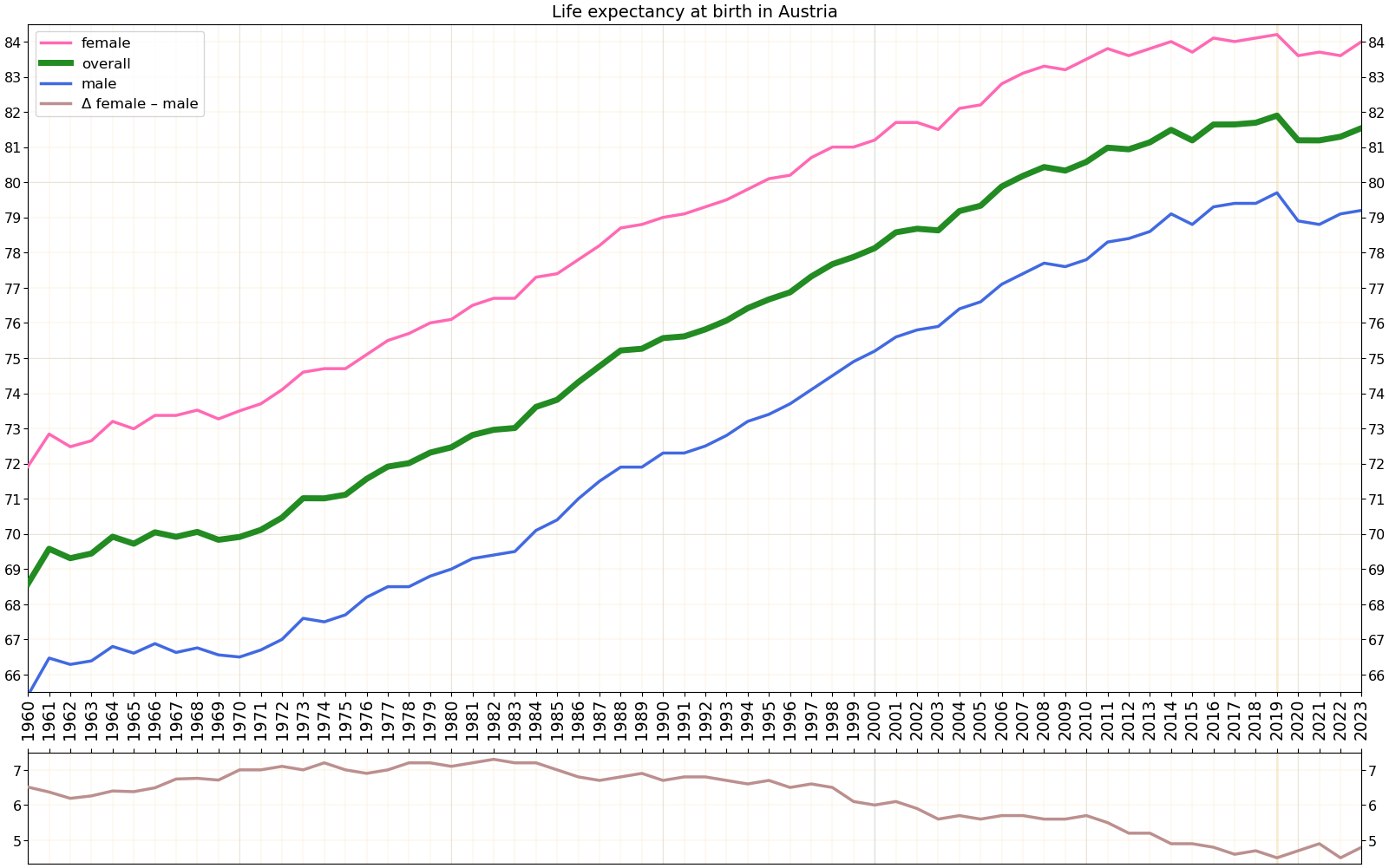
Life expectancy in Austria since 1960 by gender

Life expectancy at birth
total population: 81.7 years. Country comparison to the world: 24th
male: 79 years
female: 84.5 years (2018 est.)

=== Age structure ===
0–14 years: 14% (male 630,739 /female 600,663)
15–24 years: 10.82% (male 484,515 /female 467,064)
25–54 years: 42.1% (male 1,851,209 /female 1,851,100)
55–64 years: 13.63% (male 595,146 /female 603,249)
65 years and over: 19.44% (male 743,174 /female 966,511) (2018 est.)

Median age
total: 44.2 years. Country comparison to the world: 12th
male: 42.9 years
female: 45.4 years (2018 est.)

=== Cities, urbanisation and population density ===
urban population: 58.3% of total population (2018)
rate of urbanization: 0.59% annual rate of change (2015–20 est.)

== Vital statistics ==
Data according to Statistik Austria.

Notable events in Austrian demographics:

- 1914-1919 – First World War
- 1938 – Anschluss
- 1940-1944 – Second World War

	Average population (1 January)	Live births	Deaths	Natural change	Crude birth rate (per 1000)	Crude death rate (per 1000)	Natural change (per 1000)	Crude migration change (per 1000)	Total Fertility Rate (Note: In fertility rates, 2.1 and above is a stable population and has been marked blue, 2 and below leads to an aging population and the result is that the population decreases.)	Infant mortality rate (per 1000 births)	Life expectancy males	Life expectancy females	Net reproduction rate
1871	4,562,000	153,283	135,968	17,315	33.6	29.8	3.8		4.65				
1872	4,604,000	158,378	144,566	13,812	34.4	31.4	3.0	5.4	4.75				
1873	4,646,000	162,610	156,540	6,070	35.0	33.7	1.3	6.1	4.83				
1874	4,688,000	162,618	143,453	19,165	34.7	30.6	4.1	7.7	4.80				
1875	4,730,000	165,017	140,481	24,536	34.9	29.7	5.2	4.9	4.81				
1876	4,772,000	169,875	136,514	33,361	35.6	28.6	7.0	3.7	4.92				
1877	4,815,000	164,673	141,070	23,603	34.2	29.3	4.9	2.0	4.72				
1878	4,857,000	162,224	145,214	17,010	33.4	29.9	3.5	3.8	4.61				
1879	4,899,000	163,566	141,091	22,475	33.4	28.8	4.6	5.1	4.61				
1880	4,941,000	165,554	135,878	29,676	33.5	27.5	6.0	4.0	4.62				
1881	4,985,000	163,957	142,073	21,884	32.9	28.5	4.4	2.9	4.55				
1882	5,030,000	165,990	144,361	21,629	33.0	28.7	4.3	4.6	4.56				
1883	5,075,000	166,953	142,608	24,345	32.7	28.1	4.6	4.6	4.51				
1884	5,121,000	170,017	139,441	30,576	33.2	27.2	6.0	4.2	4.58				
1885	5,166,000	167,895	146,193	21,702	32.5	28.3	4.2	2.8	4.49				
1886	5,212,000	169,911	143,846	26,065	32.6	27.6	5.0	4.7	4.51				
1887	5,257,000	170,853	140,888	29,965	32.5	26.8	5.7	3.6	4.49				
1888	5,303,000	170,226	143,711	26,515	32.1	27.1	5.0	3.0	4.43				
1889	5,348,000	172,206	137,444	34,762	32.2	25.7	6.5	3.5	4.44				
1890	5,394,000	165,596	145,099	20,497	30.7	26.9	3.8	2.1	4.24				
1891	5,446,000	176,450	142,685	33,765	32.4	26.2	6.2	5.8	4.48				
1892	5,504,000	171,725	146,406	25,318	31.2	26.6	4.6	4.4	4.31				
1893	5,563,000	175,791	139,631	36,160	31.6	25.1	6.5	6.1	4.36				
1894	5,622,000	176,531	139,426	37,105	31.4	24.8	6.6	4.1	4.34				
1895	5,680,000	181,192	140,864	40,328	31.9	24.8	7.1	3.7	4.40				
1896	5,739,000	183,074	137,162	45,912	31.9	23.9	8.0	3.3	4.40				
1897	5,798,000	182,057	135,673	46,384	31.4	23.4	8.0	2.3	4.33				
1898	5,856,000	184,464	132,967	51,497	31.5	22.7	8.8	2.0	4.35				
1899	5,915,000	186,323	138,411	47,912	31.5	23.4	8.1	1.3	4.35				
1900	5,973,000	187,094	138,509	48,585	31.3	23.2	8.1	2.3	4.33				
1901	6,035,000	189,539	134,234	55,305	31.4	22.2	9.2	1.4	4.34				
1902	6,099,000	191,926	134,479	57,447	31.5	22.0	9.4	1.3	4.35				
1903	6,164,000	184,244	133,435	50,809	29.9	21.6	8.2	2.2	4.13				
1904	6,228,000	187,963	131,309	56,654	30.2	21.1	9.1	1.2	4.17				
1905	6,292,000	181,685	142,673	39,012	28.9	22.7	6.2	4.1	3.99				
1906	6,357,000	184,477	129,084	55,393	29.0	20.3	8.7	1.4	4.01				
1907	6,421,000	181,026	132,006	49,020	28.2	20.6	7.6	2.4	3.89				
1908	6,485,000	184,477	136,434	48,043	28.4	21.0	7.4	2.6	3.83				
1909	6,550,000	180,106	134,152	45,954	27.5	20.5	7.0	2.8	3.80				
1910	6,614,000	176,588	127,243	49,345	26.7	19.2	7.5	0.8	3.69				
1911	6,669,000	168,916	132,615	36,301	25.3	19.9	5.4	2.8	3.50				
1912	6,724,000	170,555	122,759	47,796	25.4	18.3	7.1	−0.7	3.50				
1913	6,767,000	163,354	124,388	38,966	24.1	18.4	5.8	−18.7	3.33				
1914	6,680,000	161,692	124,560	37,132	24.2	18.6	5.6	−4.1	3.20				
1915	6,690,000	125,680	144,259	-18,579	18.8	21.6	−1.7	-2.8	3.07				
1916	6,660,000	98,895	139,324	-40,429	14.8	20.9	-6.1	−1.4	2.94				
1917	6,610,000	92,289	150,346	-58,057	14.0	22.7	-8.8	−1.3	2.81				
1918	6,543,000	92,560	172,573	-80,013	14.1	26.4	-12.2	−6.6	2.68				
1919	6,420,000	118,518	130,658	-12,140	18.5	20.4	-1.9	7.4	2.55				
1920	6,455,000	146,644	122,775	23,869	22.7	19.0	3.7	3.9	3.14				
1921	6,504,000	151,138	110,451	40,687	23.2	17.0	6.3	−2.6	3.21				
1922	6,528,000	150,958	113,467	37,491	23.1	17.4	5.7	−3.4	3.19				
1923	6,543,000	146,885	99,924	46,961	22.4	15.3	7.2	−4.3	3.10				
1924	6,562,000	142,141	98,055	44,086	21.7	14.9	6.7	−3.7	2.99				
1925	6,582,000	135,841	94,988	40,853	20.6	14.4	6.2	−3.0	2.85				
1926	6,603,000	127,250	98,905	28,345	19.3	15.0	4.3	−1.3	2.66				
1927	6,623,000	118,669	99,080	19,589	17.9	15.0	3.0	0	2.47				
1928	6,643,000	116,729	95,959	20,770	17.6	14.4	3.1	0.1	2.43				
1929	6,664,000	112,047	97,300	14,747	16.8	14.6	2.2	0.8	2.32				
1930	6,684,000	112,330	90,315	22,015	16.8	13.5	3.3	−0.2	2.32				
1931	6,705,000	106,324	93,895	12,429	15.9	14.0	1.9	1.1	2.19				
1932	6,725,000	102,277	93,599	8,678	15.2	13.9	1.3	1.8	2.10				
1933	6,746,000	96,369	88,977	7,392	14.3	13.2	1.1	0.2	1.97				
1934	6,755,000	91,567	85,685	5,882	13.6	12.7	0.9	0	1.87				
1935	6,761,000	88,689	92,524	-3,835	13.1	13.7	-0.6	0.2	1.81				
1936	6,758,000	88,264	89,078	-814	13.1	13.2	-0.1	−0.3	1.80				
1937	6,755,000	86,351	90,035	-3,684	12.8	13.3	-0.5	0.2	1.54				
1938	6,753,000	93,812	94,755	-943	13.9	14.0	-0.1	−14.0	1.92				
1939	6,658,000	137,825	101,709	36,116	20.7	15.3	5.4	1.7	2.86				
1940	6,705,000	145,926	99,475	46,451	21.8	14.8	6.9	−3.0	2.70				
1941	6,731,000	135,398	94,121	41,277	20.1	14.0	6.1	4.0	2.53				
1942	6,799,000	116,172	90,510	25,662	17.1	13.3	3.8	−1.4	2.37				
1943	6,815,000	122,443	94,269	28,174	18.0	13.8	4.1	−0.9	2.21				
1944	6,837,000	126,938	109,622	17,316	18.6	16.0	2.5	−8.9	2.04				
1945	6,793,000	101,369	173,767	-72,398	14.9	25.6	-10.7	41.2	1.88				
1946	6,882,000	111,302	94,077	17,225	15.9	13.4	2.5	−6.6	2.01	81.4			
1947	6,971,000	128,953	90,027	38,926	18.5	12.9	5.6	−8.2	2.35	78.3			
1948	6,953,000	123,221	84,213	39,008	17.7	12.1	5.6	−7.2	2.25	76.2			
1949	6,942,000	113,375	89,247	24,128	16.3	12.9	3.5	−4.5	2.07	75.2			
1950	6,935,000	107,854	85,710	22,144	15.6	12.4	3.2	−3.3	2.09	66.1			
1951	6,934,000	102,764	88,253	14,511	14.8	12.7	2.1	−3.0	2.02	61.3			
1952	6,928,000	103,012	83,372	19,640	14.9	12.0	2.8	−2.2	2.06	51.9			
1953	6,932,000	102,867	83,399	19,468	14.8	12.0	2.8	−1.6	2.09	49.9			
1954	6,940,000	103,985	84,632	19,353	15.0	12.2	2.8	−1.8	2.15	48.3			
1955	6,947,000	108,575	84,995	23,580	15.6	12.2	3.4	−2.7	2.29	45.6			
1956	6,952,000	115,827	86,824	29,003	16.7	12.5	4.2	−2.2	2.48	43.3			
1957	6,966,000	118,712	89,298	29,414	17.0	12.8	4.2	−1.2	2.57	44.2			
1958	6,987,000	119,755	85,980	33,775	17.1	12.3	4.8	−0.9	2.60	40.7			
1959	7,014,000	124,377	87,970	36,407	17.7	12.5	5.2	−0.4	2.69	39.8			
1960	7,048,000	125,945	89,603	36,342	17.9	12.7	5.2	0.3	2.70	37.5			
1961	7,087,000	131,563	85,673	45,890	18.6	12.1	6.5	−0.4	2.79	32.7			1.29
1962	7,130,000	133,253	90,854	42,399	18.7	12.7	5.9	0.6	2.80	32.8			1.30
1963	7,176,000	134,809	91,579	43,230	18.8	12.8	6.0	0.7	2.82	31.3			1.31
1964	7,224,000	133,841	89,081	44,760	18.6	12.3	6.2	0.3	2.80	29.2			1.30
1965	7,271,000	129,924	94,273	35,651	17.9	13.0	4.9	2.1	2.71	28.3			1.26
1966	7,322,000	128,577	91,440	37,137	17.6	12.5	5.1	2.4	2.66	28.1			1.24
1967	7,377,000	127,404	95,438	31,966	17.4	13.0	4.3	0.9	2.62	26.4			1.23
1968	7,415,000	126,115	96,014	30,101	17.1	13.0	4.1	−0.6	2.59	25.5			1.21
1969	7,441,000	121,377	98,715	22,662	16.4	13.4	3	0.5	2.50	25.4			1.17
1970	7,467,000	112,301	98,819	13,482	15.1	13.3	1.8	2.6	2.29	25.9	66.5	73.4	1.07
1971	7,500,000	108,510	97,334	11,176	14.6	13.1	1.5	4.4	2.20	26.1	66.6	73.7	1.03
1972	7,544,000	104,033	95,323	8,710	13.9	12.7	1.2	4.4	2.09	25.2	66.9	74.0	0.98
1973	7,586,000	98,041	92,768	5,273	13.0	12.3	0.7	1.0	1.94	23.8	67.5	74.6	0.91
1974	7,599,000	97,430	94,324	3,106	12.9	12.5	0.4	−3.0	1.91	23.5	67.5	74.7	0.90
1975	7,579,000	93,757	96,041	-2,284	12.4	12.7	-0.3	−1.4	1.83	20.5	67.7	74.7	0.86
1976	7,566,000	87,446	95,140	-7,694	11.6	12.6	-1.0	1.3	1.69	18.2	68.2	75.1	0.80
1977	7,568,000	85,595	92,402	-6,807	11.3	12.2	-0.9	0.1	1.63	16.8	68.5	75.5	0.77
1978	7,562,000	85,402	94,617	-9,215	11.3	12.5	-1.2	−0.5	1.61	15.0	68.5	75.7	0.76
1979	7,549,000	86,388	92,012	-5,624	11.4	12.2	-0.7	0.7	1.60	14.7	68.8	76.0	0.76
1980	7,549,000	90,872	92,442	-1,570	12.0	12.2	-0.2	2.8	1.65	14.3	69.0	76.1	0.78
1981	7,569,000	93,942	92,693	1,249	12.4	12.2	0.2	1.8	1.67	12.7	69.3	76.4	0.80
1982	7,584,094	94,840	91,339	3,501	12.5	12.1	0.5	−3.1	1.66	12.8	69.4	76.6	0.79
1983	7,564,168	90,118	93,041	-2,923	11.9	12.3	-0.4	−0.2	1.56	11.9	69.5	76.6	0.74
1984	7,559,635	89,234	88,466	768	11.8	11.7	0.1	0.4	1.52	11.4	70.0	77.2	0.73
1985	7,563,233	87,440	89,578	-2,138	11.6	11.8	-0.3	0.8	1.47	11.2	70.4	77.3	0.70
1986	7,566,736	86,964	87,071	-107	11.5	11.5	-0.0	0.8	1.45	10.3	70.9	77.7	0.69
1987	7,572,852	86,503	84,907	1,596	11.4	11.2	0.2	0.3	1.43	9.8	71.4	78.1	0.68
1988	7,576,319	88,052	83,263	4,789	11.6	11.0	0.6	1.8	1.45	8.1	71.9	78.6	0.69
1989	7,594,315	88,759	83,407	5,352	11.6	10.9	0.7	6.0	1.44	8.3	71.9	78.7	0.69
1990	7,644,818	90,454	82,952	7,502	11.8	10.8	1.0	7.6	1.46	7.8	72.2	78.9	0.70
1991	7,710,882	94,629	83,428	11,201	12.2	10.8	1.4	10.0	1.51	7.5	72.3	79.0	0.72
1992	7,798,899	95,302	83,162	12,140	12.2	10.6	1.4	9.3	1.51	7.5	72.5	79.2	0.72
1993	7,882,519	95,227	82,517	12,710	12.0	10.4	1.6	4.3	1.50	6.5	72.8	79.4	0.72
1994	7,928,746	92,415	80,684	11,731	11.6	10.2	1.5	0.4	1.47	6.3	73.1	79.7	0.70
1995	7,943,489	88,669	81,171	7,498	11.2	10.2	0.9	0.3	1.42	5.4	73.3	80.0	0.68
1996	7,953,067	88,809	80,790	8,019	11.2	10.2	1.0	0.5	1.45	5.1	73.7	80.1	0.69
1997	7,964,966	84,045	79,432	4,613	10.5	10.0	0.6	0.2	1.39	4.7	74.0	80.6	0.67
1998	7,971,116	81,233	78,339	2,894	10.2	9.8	0.4	1.0	1.37	4.9	74.5	80.8	0.66
1999	7,982,461	78,138	78,200	-62	9.8	9.8	0.0	2.5	1.34	4.4	74.8	80.9	0.64
2000	8,002,186	78,268	76,780	1,488	9.8	9.6	0.2	2.1	1.36	4.8	75.1	81.1	0.66
2001	8,020,946	75,458	74,767	691	9.4	9.3	0.1	5.2	1.33	3.7	75.6	81.6	0.64
2002	8,063,640	78,399	76,131	2,268	9.7	9.4	0.3	4.2	1.39	4.3	75.8	81.7	0.67
2003	8,100,273	76,944	77,209	-265	9.5	9.5	-0.0	5.2	1.38	4.0	75.9	81.5	0.66
2004	8,142,573	78,968	74,292	4,676	9.7	9.1	0.6	6.6	1.42	4.0	76.4	82.1	0.68
2005	8,201,359	78,190	75,189	3,001	9.5	9.1	0.4	6.1	1.41	3.7	76.6	82.2	0.68
2006	8,254,298	77,914	74,295	3,619	9.4	9.0	0.4	3.1	1.41	4.0	77.1	82.7	0.68
2007	8,282,984	76,250	74,625	1,625	9.2	9.0	0.2	2.8	1.39	3.8	77.3	82.8	0.67
2008	8,307,984	77,752	75,083	2,669	9.3	9.0	0.3	3.0	1.42	3.3	77.6	83.0	0.68
2009	8,335,003	76,344	77,381	-1,037	9.1	9.3	-0.1	2.1	1.40	3.7	77.4	82.9	0.67
2010	8,351,643	78,742	77,199	1,543	9.4	9.2	0.2	2.6	1.44	3.8	77.7	83.2	0.70
2011	8,375,164	78,109	76,479	1,630	9.3	9.1	0.2	3.7	1.43	3.8	78.1	83.4	0.69
2012	8,408,121	78,952	79,436	-484	9.3	9.4	-0.1	5.3	1.44	3.2	78.3	83.3	0.70
2013	8,451,860	79,330	79,526	-196	9.3	9.3	-0.0	6.6	1.44	3.1	78.45	83.56	0.69
2014	8,507,786	81,722	78,252	3,470	9.6	9.1	0.4	8.7	1.46	3.0	78.91	83.74	0.71
2015	8,584,926	84,381	83,073	1,308	9.7	9.5	0.2	13.3	1.49	3.1	78.63	83.59	0.72
2016	8,700,471	87,675	80,669	7,006	10.1	9.2	0.9	7.4	1.53	3.1	79.14	83.95	0.74
2017	8,772,865	87,633	83,270	4,363	10.0	9.5	0.5	5.1	1.52	2.9	79.3	83.9	0.73
2018	8,822,267	85,535	83,975	1,560	9.7	9.5	0.2	3.9	1.48	2.7	79.3	84.0	0.71
2019	8,858,775	84,952	83,386	1,566	9.6	9.4	0.2	4.6	1.46	2.9	79.5	84.2	0.71
2020	8,901,064	83,603	91,599	-7,996	9.4	10.2	-0.9	4.5	1.44	3.1	78.9	83.7	0.69
2021	8,932,664	86,078	91,962	-5,884	9.6	10.3	-0.7	5.9	1.48	2.7	78.8	83.8	0.71
2022	8,978,929	82,627	93,332	-10,705	9.2	10.4	-1.2	15.2	1.41	2.4	79.1	83.8	0.68
2023	9,104,772	77,605	89,760	-12,155	8.5	9.8	-1.3	7.3	1.32	2.8	79.4	84.2	0.64
2024	9,158,750	77,238	88,486	-11,248	8.4	9.5	-1.1	5.1	1.31	3.1	79.8	84.3	0.63
2025	9,197,213	76,067	87,902	-11,835	8.3	9.6	-1.3		1.30(e)				
2026	9,219,113												

In the year 2024, 33.3% of all newborns had mothers with a foreign (non-Austrian) nationality and 35.8% had foreign-born mothers.

=== Current vital statistics ===
Period	Live births	Deaths	Natural increase
January—September 2025	57,565	65,068	−7,503
January—September 2026	56,551	63,578	−7,027
Difference	▼ –1,014 (−1.76%)	▼ –1,490 (–2.29%)	▲ +476

View source data.

=== Total fertility rates by federal state and nationality ===
2025
States	TFR
Oberösterreich	1.42
Vorarlberg	1.40
Niederösterreich	1.36
Salzburg	1.36
Kärnten	1.32
Austria	1.30
Tirol	1.28
Steiermark	1.26
Wien	1.21
Burgenland	1.17

==== Regions and cities ====
2024
Regions and cities	TFR
Ostösterreich	1.27
Mittelburgenland	1.25
Nordburgenland	1.18
Südburgenland	1.23
Mostviertel-Eisenwurzen	1.47
Niederösterreich-Süd	1.40
Sankt Pölten	1.36
Waldviertel	1.39
Weinviertel	1.29
Wiener Umland/Nordteil	1.35
Wiener Umland/Südteil	1.31
Wien	1.23
Südösterreich	1.29
Klagenfurt-Villach	1.26
Oberkärnten	1.36
Unterkärnten	1.34
Graz	1.23
Liezen	1.40
Östliche Obersteiermark	1.29
Oststeiermark	1.37
West- und Südsteiermark	1.31
Westliche Obersteiermark	1.47
Westösterreich	1.40
Innviertel	1.52
Linz-Wels	1.40
Mühlviertel	1.58
Steyr-Kirchdorf	1.45
Traunviertel	1.44
Salzburg	1.33
Lungau	1.47
Pinzgau-Pongau	1.43
Salzburg und Umgebung	1.28
Außerfem	1.44
Innsbruck	1.17
Osttirol	1.67
Tiroler Oberland	1.38
Tiroler Unterland	1.41
Bludenz-Bregenzer Wald	1.47
Rheintal-Bodenseegebiet	1.45
Austria	1.31

==== Nationality ====
2025
Country of birth	TFR
Austria	1.19
Foreign countries	1.57
EU before 2004; UK, EFTA	1.08
EU after 2004	1.28
EU after 2007	1.82
Former Yugoslavia (non-EU)	1.92
Turkey	1.69
Afghanistan, Syria, Iraq	3.37
Other countries	1.23

=== Structure of the population ===
Population by Sex and Age Group (Census 31.X.2011):

Age group	Male	Female	Total	%
Total	4,093,938	4,308,002	8,401,940	100
0–4	202 637	192 069	394 706	4.70
5–9	207 779	198 248	406 027	4.83
10–14	218 499	208 458	426 957	5.08
15–19	251 251	237 567	488 818	5.82
20–24	267 651	260 024	527 675	6.28
25–29	277 236	275 547	552 783	6.58
30–34	270 267	268 040	538 307	6.41
35–39	280 207	284 610	564 817	6.72
40–44	338 455	336 787	675 242	8.04
45–49	358 163	352 225	710 388	8.46
50–54	312 890	313 272	626 162	7.45
55–59	253 019	264 261	517 280	6.16
60–64	231 598	249 067	480 665	5.72
65–69	189 221	213 608	402 829	4.79
70–74	187 956	222 358	410 314	4.88
75–79	110 870	151 333	262 203	3.12
80–84	83 066	135 067	218 133	2.60
85–89	40 153	101 619	141 772	1.69
90–94	10 997	35 365	46 362	0.55
95–99	1 836	7 552	9 388	0.11
100+	187	925	1 112	0.01
Age group	Male	Female	Total	Percent
0–14	628 915	598 775	1,227,690	14.61
15–64	2,840,737	2,841,400	5,682,137	67.63
65+	624 286	867 827	1,492,113	17.76

Population Estimates by Sex and Age Group (01.I.2020):

Age group	Male	Female	Total	%
Total	4,378,772	4,522,292	8,901,064	100
0–4	224 096	211 739	435 835	4.90
5–9	219 209	206 018	425 227	4.78
10–14	216 381	205 617	421 998	4.74
15–19	225 558	212 297	437 855	4.92
20–24	266 200	251 570	517 770	5.82
25–29	308 142	293 260	601 402	6.76
30–34	309 081	298 547	607 628	6.83
35–39	307 461	302 843	610 304	6.86
40–44	283 167	281 274	564 441	6.34
45–49	308 507	313 946	622 453	6.99
50–54	356 947	354 457	711 404	7.99
55–59	342 150	343 335	685 485	7.70
60–64	275 937	289 698	565 635	6.35
65–69	213 220	237 161	450 381	5.06
70–74	179 931	211 723	391 654	4.40
75–79	165 737	211 808	377 545	4.24
80–84	102 723	144 999	247 722	2.78
85–89	51 519	91 697	143 216	1.61
90–94	19 354	46 360	65 714	0.74
95–99	3 278	12 924	16 202	0.18
100–104	167	966	1 133	0.01
105–109	7	52	59	<0.01
110+	0	1	1	<0.01
Age group	Male	Female	Total	Percent
0–14	659 686	623 374	1,283,060	14.41
15–64	2,983,150	2,941,227	5,924,377	66.56
65+	735 936	957 691	1,693,627	19.03

== Ethnic groups ==
=== Traditional ethnic minorities in Austria ===
Only three numerically significant traditional minority groups exist – 13,109 Carinthian Slovenes (according to the 2001 census – unofficial estimates of Slovene organisations put the number at 50,000) in Austrian Carinthia (south central Austria) and about 25,000 Croats and 20,000 Hungarians in Burgenland (on the Hungarian border). The Slovenes (also called 'Windische') form a closely knit community. Their rights as well as those of the Croats are protected by law and generally respected in practice. The present boundaries of Austria, once the center of the Habsburg monarchy that constituted the second-largest composite monarchy in Europe, were established in accordance with the Treaty of Saint-Germain-en-Laye in 1919. Some Austrians, particularly near Vienna, still have relatives in countries that made up the Monarchy, namely Croatia, Czech Republic, Slovakia, Slovenia and Hungary.

=== New ethnic minorities in Austria ===
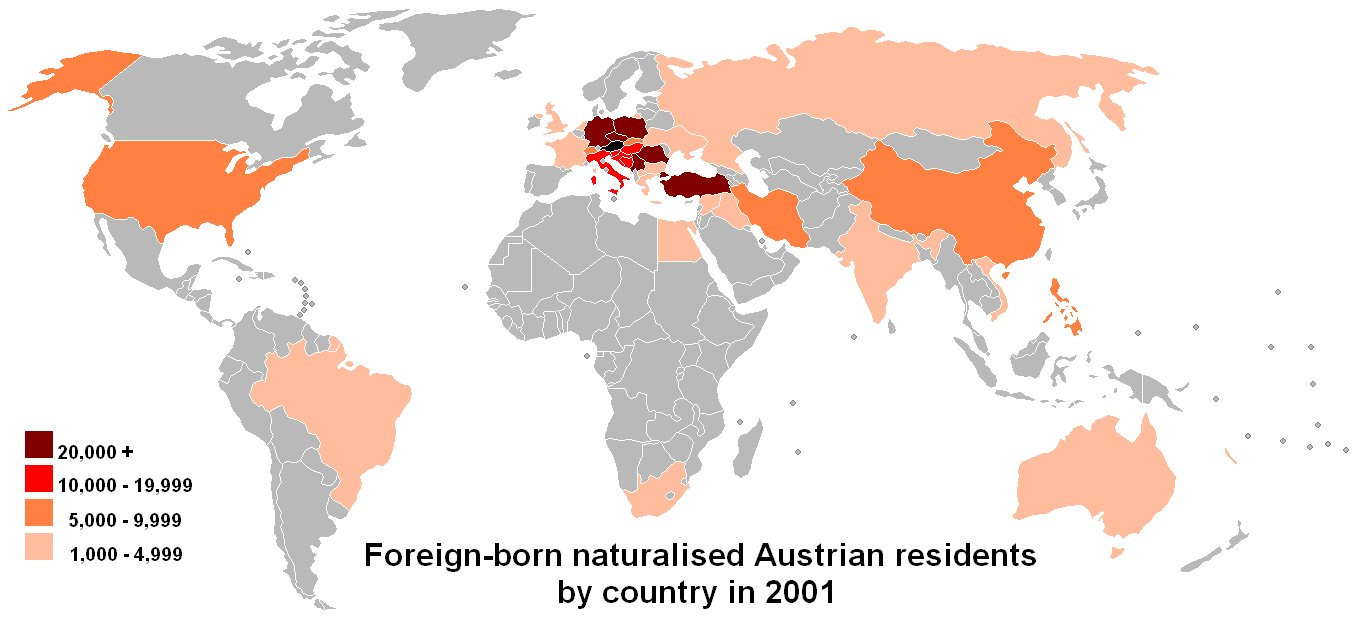

Austria does not collect data on the ethnicity or race of its citizens but does collect data on the nationality of residents currently in the country.

According to the Austrian Statistical Bureau, 814,800 foreigners legally lived in Austria in mid-2006, representing 9.8% of the total population, one of the highest rates in Europe.

Of these foreign residents, 305,100 came from the former Yugoslavia and 110,800 from Turkey.

Owing to a growing naturalization rate, 330,000 people have been naturalized between 1985 and the end of 2003, representing about 4% of the 7.4 million Austrian citizens living today in the country.

Of these new citizens 110,000 came from the former Yugoslavia and 90,000 from Turkey. Considering pre-1985 naturalizations, in 2005 at least 18% (in Vienna more than 30%) of the population was either foreign or of foreign origin. Native Austrians have had stagnant demographics since World War I, and have been in absolute decline since the 1970s.

Foreign nationals within Austria in 2022

=== Immigration ===
As of 2011, Statistik Austria official estimates have shown that 81% of residents, or 6.75 million had no migration background and more than 19% or 1.6 million inhabitants had at least one parent of immigrant background. There are more than 415,000 descendants of foreign-born immigrants residing in Austria, the great majority of whom have been naturalized.

According to Eurostat, there were 1.27 million foreign-born residents in Austria in 2010, corresponding to 15.2% of the total population. Of these, 764,000 (9.1%) were born outside the EU and 512,000 (6.1%) were born in another EU member state.

350,000 ethnic Turks (including a minority of Turkish Kurds) currently live in Austria. At about 3% of the total population, they make up the biggest single ethnic minority in Austria.

In 2018, the percentage of foreign born people was around 19% of the total population which is also the second highest foreign born proportion of all EU countries after Luxembourg.

=== Migration data of Austria, 2013–present ===
International migration
Year	Immigration	Emigration	Net migration
2013	151,280	96,552	+54,728
2014	170,115	97,791	+72,324
2015	214,410	101,343	+113,067
2016	174,310	109,634	+64,676
2017	154,749	110,119	+44,630
2018	146,856	111,555	+35,301
2019	150,419	109,806	+40,613
2020	136,343	96,279	+40,064
2021	154,202	101,714	+52,488
2022	261,937	124,958	+136,979
2023	194,959	128,330	+66,629
2024	178,574	128,469	+50,105
2025	159,779	127,180	+32,599

Migration background groups	Year															
Migration background groups	2008		2010		2012		2014		2016		2018		2020		2025	
Migration background groups	Number	%	Number	%	Number	%	Number	%	Number	%	Number	%	Number	%	Number	%
Non-migrant background	6,784,300	82.6%	6,717,300	81.5%	6,739,800	81.2%	6,700,500	79.6%	6,701,100	77.9%	6,656,300	76.7%	6,628,600	75.6%	6,490,100	71.8%
Migrant background (1st and 2nd generations)	1,426,400	17.4%	1,528,200	18.5%	1,563,000	18.8%	1,714,600	20.4%	1,898,000	22.1%	2,022,200	23.3%	2,137,800	24.4%	2,553,600	28.2%
Total	8,210,700	100%	8,245,500	100%	8,302,900	100%	8,415,100	100%	8,599,200	100%	8,678,600	100%	8,766,300	100%	9,043,700	100%

Background group	2008		2011		2016		2021	
Background group	Number	%	Number	%	Number	%	Number	%
European	7,795,000		7,789,000					
Without migrant background	6,784,000	82,6%	6,721,000	81,3%	6,701,000	77,9%	6,567,000	74,6%
(Kingdom of Yugoslavia) Yugoslavian	444,000		450,000		525,000		584,000	
(Germany) German	200,000		220,000					
(Poland) Polish	58,000		60,000					
(Romania) Romanian	56,000		68,000					
(Czech Republic) Czech	49,000		45,000					
(Hungary) Hungarian	36,000		41,000					
Other	172,000		184,000					
Euroasian	180,000		185.000		272.000		286,000	
(Turkey) Turkish	180,000		185,000		272,000		286,000	
Asian	282,000		294,000					
(Islamic Republic of Afghanistan) Afghan							127,000	
(Syria) Syrian							127,000	
(Iraq) Iraqi							127,000	
Other	102,000		109,000					
African	40,000		41,000					
(Egypt) Egyptian	13,000							
Other	27,000							
American	29,000		30,000					
North American			13,000					
Latin American			17,000					
Australia/Oceania	2,600		2,700					
Other/unspecified/mixed	62,000		112,000					
Total: Foreign background	1,426,000	17,4%	1,548,000	18,7%	1,898,000	22,1%	2,240,000	25,4%
Total	8,210,000		8,269,000		8,599,000		8,807,000	

As of 2023, the most common groups of foreign residents in Austria were as follows:

Rank	Nationality	Population	% of foreign nationals
	Total	1,729,820	100
1	(European Union) Germany	225,012	13.0
2	(European Union) Romania	147,490	8.5
3	Turkey	120,706	7.0
4	Serbia	116,116	6.8
5	Bosnia and Herzegovina	102,468	6.0
6	(European Union) Croatia	101,803	5.8
7	(European Union) Hungary	101,679	5.8
8	Syria	82,169	4.8
9	Ukraine	79,615	4.6
10	(European Union) Poland	67,168	4.0
11	Afghanistan	50,378	3.0
12	(European Union) Slovakia	48,477	2.8
13	(European Union) Bulgaria	38,469	2.2
14	(European Union) Italy	37,718	2.2
15	Russia	35,586	2.1
	Other nationalities	379,178	21.9

== Naturalisation ==
Foreign nationals may apply for Austrian citizenship under the following preconditions: at least 10 years of continuous stay in Austria (a minimum of five years of which as a permanent resident), sufficient financial means/secure income, no criminal record, sufficient knowledge of the German language, positive attitude towards the Republic of Austria. EEA citizens may apply for citizenship after six years of permanent residence in Austria.

Naturalisation in Austria by region (2013–2024)
Region	Naturalised persons	Percentage
Europe (EU and EFTA)	18,594	16.2%
Other European countries (incl. Türkiye)	52,741	45.9%
Africa	9,406	8.2%
America	2,704	2.4%
Asia	30,416	26.5%
Oceania	45	0.04%
Unknown	1,034	0.9%
Total	114,940	100%

== Languages ==
- German (official nationwide) 88.8% (94% Austrian German, 6% Alemannic)
- Turkish 2.5%
- Serbian 2.3%
- Croatian (official in Burgenland) 1.3%
- Slovene (official in Carinthia) 0.2–0.5%
- Hungarian (official in Burgenland) 0.2%
- Czech 0.2%
- Slovak 0.1%
- Yiddish ?%
- Romani ?%
- Languages of the recent immigrant groups around 10% (Census 2001 (link from Web Archive))

== Religion ==
Religion in Austria (2021)
1. Catholicism (55.2%)
2. Eastern Orthodoxy (4.90%)
3. Protestantism (3.80%)
4. Other Christians (4.30%)
5. No religion (22.4%)
6. Islam (8.30%)
7. Other religions (1.10%)

In 2001, about 74% of Austria's population were registered as Roman Catholic, while about 5% considered themselves Protestants. Austrian Christians, both Catholic and Protestant, are obliged to pay a mandatory membership fee (calculated by income—about 1%) to their church; this payment is called "Kirchenbeitrag" ("Ecclesiastical/Church contribution"). Since the second half of the 20th century, the number of adherents and churchgoers has declined. Data for the end of 2016 from the Austrian Roman Catholic church lists 5,162,622 members, or 58.8% of the total Austrian population. Sunday church attendance was 605,828 or 7% of the total Austrian population in 2015. The Lutheran church also recorded a loss of 74,421 adherents between 2001 and 2016.

About 12% of the population declared that they have no religion in 2001; this share had grown to 20% by 2015. Of the remaining people, around 340,000 were registered as members of various Muslim communities in 2001, mainly due to the influx from Turkey, Bosnia-Herzegovina and Kosovo. The number of Muslims has doubled in 15 years to 700,000 in 2016. About 680,000 are members of Eastern Orthodox Church (mostly Romanians and Serbs), about 21,000 people are active Jehovah's Witnesses and about 8,100 are Jewish.

An estimated 15,000 Jews or adherents of Judaism live in Austria, primarily in Vienna – a remnant of the post-World War II community after the Nazi Holocaust.

- Sikhism in Austria
- Hinduism in Austria
- Buddhism in Austria
- Roman Catholicism in Austria
- Islam in Austria
- History of the Jews in Austria
- Pre-Christian Alpine traditions

=== Newborn by religion ===
Newborn by religion of father
Year	Catholic	Protestant	Orthodox	Muslim	Other
2019	34.68%	2.15%	3.73%	12.09%	47.35%
2018	39.24%	2.36%	4.29%	13.80%	40.31%
2017	43.40%	2.68%	4.80%	14.66%	34.46%
2016	44.35%	2.73%	4.64%	14.82%	33.46%
2015	43.89%	2.62%	4.40%	12.75%	36.34%

Newborn by religion of mother
Year	Catholic	Protestant	Orthodox	Muslim	Other
2019	37.73%	2.29%	4.40%	11.66%	43.92%
2018	42.54%	2.65%	4.99%	13.37%	36.45%
2017	47.08%	3.01%	5.54%	14.28%	30.09%
2016	49.26%	3.24%	5.3%	14.59%	27.61%
2015	49.52%	3.08%	5.08%	12.75%	29.57%

- In 2017, 41,259 out of the 87,633 newborns had a Catholic mother (father: 38,096), 12,514 Muslim mother (father: 12,851) and 2,635 had a Protestant mother (father: 2,352).
- In 2016, 43,190 out of the 87,675 newborns had a Catholic mother (father: 38,884), 12,794 Muslim mother (father: 12,996) and 2,841 had a Protestant mother (father: 2,398).
- In 2015, 41,783 out of the 84,381 newborns had a Catholic mother (father: 37,036), 10,760 Muslim mother (father: 10,972) and 2,595 had a Protestant mother (father: 2,212).
