= Freedom of religion in Austria =

The constitution provides for freedom of religion.

In 2023, the country was scored 3 out of 4 for religious freedom; in 2021, the government established a new staff unit in the fight against antisemitism sentiment and violence.

According to government estimates, in 2022, Roman Catholics make up over 55% of the population. Followers of Eastern Orthodoxy make up 4.9%, Protestants make up 3.8% and Muslims (mainly Sunni) make up 8.3%. Over 22% of the population follows no religion, while the remainder includes Jehovah’s Witnesses, Jews, and other religious groups.

This report is informed by the US State Dept 2007 International Freedom Report. Later reports are available.

== Religious demography ==
The country has an area of 32,369 square miles (83,840 km^{2}) and a population of 8.2 million. The largest minority groups are Croatian, Slovene, Hungarian, Czech, Slovak, and Roma. In past years the country experienced some immigration from countries such as Turkey and Bosnia-Herzegovina, which increased the number of Muslims in the country. The Muslim community has more than doubled since 1991 to an estimated 339,000, or 4.2 percent of the population. In recent years immigration has slowed down due to the introduction of a quota system in the late 1990s. By far the largest ethnic group is Turkish, of which 123,000 have Turkish citizenship. Many more ethnic Turks are Austrian citizens. The next largest groups are Bosnians with 64,600, Yugoslavians with 21,600, Macedonians with 11,000, and Iranians with 3,800. The largest groups of Arab Muslims are Egyptians with 3,500 and Tunisians with 1,000.

According to the most recent census in 2001, membership in major religions is as follows: Roman Catholic Church, 74 percent; Lutheran and Presbyterian Churches (Evangelical Church-Augsburger and Helvetic confessions), 4.7 percent; Islamic community, 4.2 percent; Jewish community, 0.1 percent; Eastern Orthodox (Russian, Greek, Serbian, Romanian, and Bulgarian), 2.2 percent; other Christian churches, 0.9 percent; and other non-Christian religious groups, 0.2 percent. Atheists account for 12 percent, and 2 percent do not indicate a religious affiliation.

The vast majority of groups termed "sects" by the Government are small organizations with fewer than 100 members. There was a report of a physical attack against a person and a violent attack against property. Among the larger groups is the Church of Scientology, with between 5,000 and 6,000 members, and the Unification Church, with approximately 700 adherents. Other groups termed "sects" include Divine Light Mission, Eckankar, Hare Krishna, the Holosophic Community, the Osho Movement, Sahaja Yoga, Sai Baba, Sri Chinmoy, Transcendental Meditation, Center for Experimental Society Formation, Fiat Lux, Universal Life, and The Family.

The provinces of Carinthia and Burgenland have somewhat higher percentages of Protestants than the national average. The number of Muslims is higher than the national average in Vienna (7.8 percent) and the province of Vorarlberg (8.4 percent), where industry draws a disproportionately higher number of guest workers from Turkey and the former Yugoslavia.

According to a poll by FESSEL-GfK, 78 percent of respondents state that they belong to a church or religious group. Of that number, 2 percent attend services more than once a week, 15 percent attend weekly, 17 percent attend a minimum of once a month, 34 percent attend several times a year (on special occasions), and 32 percent never attend.

== Status of religious freedom ==
=== Legal and policy framework ===
The Constitution provides for freedom of religion, and the Government generally respected this right in practice, except for religious groups that receive second-class status (or no status) under the 1998 Law on the Status of Religious Confessional Communities. Some of these groups are termed "sects." One group that has gone to court over its treatment is the Jehovah's Witnesses, which has taken its case to the European Court of Human Rights (ECHR). The Church of Scientology is also denied acknowledgement as a religious group.

The Government is secular. The Roman Catholic Church is the predominant religion; many Catholic holidays are also government holidays.

The status of religious organizations is governed by the 1874 Law on Recognition of Churches and by the 1998 Law on the Status of Religious Confessional Communities, which establishes the status of "confessional communities." Religious organizations are divided into three legal categories (listed in descending order of status): Officially recognized religious societies, religious confessional communities, and associations. Each category of organizations possesses a distinct set of rights, privileges, and responsibilities.

Recognition as a religious society under the 1874 law has wide-ranging implications, such as the authority to participate in the mandatory church contributions program, to provide religious instruction in public schools, and to bring religious workers into the country to act as ministers, missionaries, or teachers. Under the 1874 law, religious societies have "public corporation" status. This status permits religious societies to engage in a number of public or quasi-public activities that are denied to confessional communities and associations. The Government provides financial support for religious teachers at both public and private schools to religious societies but not to other religious organizations. The Government provides financial support to private schools run by the officially recognized religious societies.

The officially recognized religious societies are:

- Catholic Church
  - Roman Rite (recognized before 1781)
  - Byzantine Rite (recognized since 1782)
  - Armenian Rite (recognized since 1810)
- Protestant Church (recognized since 1781)
  - Lutheran called "Augsburger" confession
  - Reformed called "Helvetic" confession
- Eastern Orthodox Church (recognized since 1782)
  - Ecumenical Patriarchate of Constantinople
  - Serbian Orthodox Church
  - Romanian Orthodox Church
  - Russian Orthodox Church
  - Bulgarian Orthodox Church
- Old Catholic Church (recognized since 1874)
- Jewish Community (recognized since 1890)
- Islamic Community (recognized since 1912)
- Methodist Church of Austria (recognized since 1951)
- Church of Jesus Christ of Latter-day Saints (Mormons) (recognized since 1955)
- Oriental Orthodox Churches
  - Armenian Apostolic Church (recognized since 1971)
  - Coptic Orthodox Church (recognized since 2003)
  - Syriac Orthodox Church
- New Apostolic Church (recognized since 1975)
- Buddhist community (recognized since 1983)
- Jehovah's Witnesses (recognized since 2009)
- Alevi Community (recognized since 2013)
- Free Churches in Austria (recognized since 2013)
  - Baptists
  - Evangelical Alliance
  - Free Christian Community (Pentecostals)
  - ELAIA Christian Community
  - Mennonites

The 1998 Law on the Status of Religious Confessional Communities imposed new criteria on religious groups to achieve religious society status, although it allowed previously recognized societies to retain their status. New criteria included a 20-year period of existence (at least 10 of which must be as a group organized as a confessional community under the 1998 law) and membership equaling at least two one-thousandths of the country's population (approximately 16,000 persons). Only 7 of the recognized religious groups (Catholic Church, Protestant Church, Islamic Community, Eastern Orthodox Church, Jehovah's Witnesses, Alevi Community and the Free Churches) meet this membership requirement. Of the unrecognized religious groups, no one meet this latter membership requirement.

The 1998 law allows nonrecognized religious groups to seek official status as "confessional communities" without the fiscal and educational privileges available to recognized religions. To apply, groups must have at least 300 members and submit to the Government their written statutes describing the goals, rights, and obligations of members, as well as membership regulations, officials, and financing. Groups also must submit a written version of their religious doctrine, which must differ from that of any religious society recognized under the 1874 law or any confessional community established under the 1998 law. The Ministry of Education then examines the doctrine for a determination that the group's basic beliefs do not violate public security, public order, health and morals, or the rights and freedoms of citizens. On June 8–9, 2005, several nongovernmental organizations (NGOs) at the Organization for Security and Cooperation in Europe (OSCE) meeting on Anti-Semitism and on Other Forms of Intolerance concluded that "the existing system and in particular the 1998 Law on Confessional Communities is inherently discriminatory as it de facto prevents religious organizations from obtaining a state-recognized status and relegates them to a second-class status."

Once the Government recognizes them, religious confessional communities have juridical standing, which permits them to engage in such activities as purchasing real estate in their own names and contracting for goods and services. A religious group that seeks to obtain this new status is subject to a six-month waiting period from the time of application to the Ministry of Education and Culture. According to the Ministry, as of June 2007, 14 groups had applied for the status of religious confessional community, and 11 were granted the new status. The Church of Scientology and the Hindu Mandir Association withdrew their applications. The Hindu Mandir Association reapplied under the name Hindu Religious Community and was granted the new status. The Ministry rejected the application of the Sahaja Yoga group in 1998. Since then, its decision has been upheld in the Constitutional Court and the Administrative Court. Following a May 2006 decree by the Ministry of Education, the ELAIA Christian Community (ELAIA Christengemeinde) also received status as confessional community after applying on October 13, 2005.

In 2018 following religious groups constitute confessional communities according to the law:

- Baháʼí Faith (since 1998)
- The Christian Community – Movement for Religious Renewal (since 1998)
- Hindu Community in Austria (since 1998)
- Seventh-day Adventist Church (since 1998)
- Pentecostal Community of God (since 2001)
- Old Alevi Community (since 2013)
- Shia Islam Community (since 2013)
- Family Federation for World Peace a.k.a. Unification Church

Religious groups that do not qualify for either religious society or confessional community status may become associations under the Law of Associations. Associations are corporations under law and have many of the same rights as confessional communities, including the right to own real estate. Some groups have organized as associations, even while applying for recognition as religious societies.

There are no restrictions on missionary activities. Historically, unrecognized religious groups had problems obtaining resident permits for foreign religious workers. Unlike visas for religious workers of recognized religions, religious workers who are members of unrecognized religions are subject to a numerical cap for what is technically a nonpreference immigrant visa category. Administrative procedures adopted in 1997 for certain unrecognized groups, which exempt these workers from having to obtain governmental permission to work, helped to address this problem in part. These procedures allowed for application under an immigrant visa category that is neither employment nor family-based. New visa laws that became effective in January 2006 brought certain changes in the implementation for a number of visa categories. New poverty guidelines and shortened visa validity periods make it more difficult for some members of this group to obtain resident permits.

The Government provides funding for religious instruction in public schools and places of worship for children belonging to any of the 13 officially recognized religious societies. The Government does not offer such funding to nonrecognized religious groups. A minimum of three children is required to form a class. In some cases, religious societies decide that the administrative cost of providing religious instruction is too great to warrant providing such courses in all schools. Attendance in religious instruction is mandatory and instruction either takes place in the school or at sites organized by the religious groups. Unless students formally withdraw at the beginning of the academic year, students under the age of 14 need parental permission to withdraw from instruction.

=== Restrictions on religious freedom ===
Several religious groups that the Government did not recognize under the 1998 law, as well as some religious law experts, dismiss the benefits of obtaining status under the 1998 law and have complained that the law's additional criteria for recognition as a religious society obstructs recognition, and formalizes a second-class status for nonrecognized groups.

Although the Ministry of Education granted Jehovah's Witnesses the status of a confessional community in 1998, they were denied recognition as a religious society in 1997 under the 1874 law. A complaint filed by the Jehovah's Witnesses with the ECHR in 1998, arguing that the group had not yet been granted full status as a religious entity in the country under the law despite a two-decade struggle, remained pending at the end of the period covered by this report. This was one of three applications that the Religious Community of Jehovah's Witnesses filed against the Government at the ECHR. Three other applications were filed by individuals and dealt with the denial of exemption for the ministers of Jehovah's Witnesses from both military and alternative service. On February 1, 2005, the ECHR ruled that two of the cases dealing with military exemption were admissible as possible violations of the European Convention on Human Rights regarding freedom of religion and discrimination. On November 16, 2006, the Jehovah's Witnesses filed an application with the ECHR regarding aspects of the Law on Confessional Communities which does not allow for religious societies to receive tax concessions. The application was filed with the ECHR after the Constitutional Court and the Administrative Court dismissed the case. These cases were pending before the courts. In 2009 the Jehovah's Witnesses became a recognized religious society.

The State of Lower Austria and the City of Vienna fund a counseling center of the Society Against Sect and Cult Dangers (GSK), a controversial quasi-NGO, which actively works against sects and cults. In 2005 GSK received an average of $29,260 (€22,000) annually from the Federal Ministry of Social Security and Generations, and $24,166 (€18,170) annually from the City Government of Vienna. However, after 2005, GSK stopped receiving federal funding due to government cuts. GSK distributes information to schools and the general public and runs a counseling center for those who believe they have been negatively affected by cults or sects. Several states fund offices that provide information on sects and cults.

The Federal Office of Sect Issues continued to function as a counseling center for those who have questions about sects and cults. Under the law, this office has independent status, but the Minister for Health, Family, and Youth appoints and supervises its head.

The conservative People's Party (OVP) position regarding membership in a "sect" remained in force during the period covered by this report. The Party's stated position is that party membership is incompatible with membership in a "sect" if the sect holds a fundamentally different view of man from what the Party believes, advocates opinions irreconcilable with the ethical principles of the party, or rejects the basic rights granted by progressively minded constitutional states and an open society. In 1998 the OVP passed a resolution banning members of "sects" from being members of the party. This resolution was passed to target a native Scientologist who was at the time a respected member of his local party organization and his local community. There were no known reports of members of other sects being denied membership in the party.

On April 21, 2007, the press found a flier with the logo of the Freedom Party of Austria (FPOe), alongside the logos of neo-Nazi organizations which were promoting xenophobic attitudes. The BBC reported that the FPOe hosted several rightwing European parties, including representatives from the French Front National, the Belgian Ulaams Belang, and the German "Pro Koeln" party. The meeting focused on "foreign infiltration." How much influence such parties have on public attitudes toward observant Muslims or the Jewish community or reflect common attitudes of the general public towards minority religious groups was difficult to determine.

Prisoners who belong to nonrecognized religious groups are entitled to pastoral care. Some evangelical groups have reported experiencing problems with access to pastoral care in isolated instances; however, there were no allegations of widespread problems.

There were no reports of religious prisoners or detainees in the country. There were no reports of forced religious conversion.

=== Antisemitism ===
The NGO Forum against Anti-Semitism reported 125 antisemitic incidents in 2006, including one physical attack. The incidents also included name-calling, graffiti/defacement, threats, anti-Semitic Internet postings, property damage, vilifying letters, and telephone calls.

On February 7, 2007, a court sentenced a 30-year-old Croatian immigrant to 15 months in prison for the November 26, 2006, destructive rampage against the Lauder Chabad School in Vienna. No one was present or injured, but a leader in the Jewish community said that the extent of the damage made this incident "the most serious in the last 20 years." Upon his arrest, the man referred to himself as "Adolf Hitler" and in the courtroom said there were too many Jews in the country.

The European Union's Monitoring Center on Racism and Xenophobia has declared in the past that antisemitism in the country was typically characterized by diffuse and traditional antisemitic stereotypes rather than by acts of physical aggression.

The Government strictly enforces its anti-neo-Nazi legislation, which prohibits neo-Nazi acts, including Holocaust denial, incitement to neo-Nazi activity and the glorification of National Socialism. On December 22, 2006, British writer and Holocaust denier David Irving was deported to Great Britain. On February 20, 2006, he had been found guilty of denying the existence of gas chambers at Auschwitz and sentenced to three years in prison.

The Government provided police protection for Jewish community institutions.

== Societal abuses and discrimination ==
There was a report of a physical attack against a person and a violent attack against property (see Anti-Semitism). There was no reported vigilante action against members of religious minorities. However, some societal mistrust and discrimination continued against members of some unrecognized religious groups, particularly against those considered to be members of sects. A large portion of the public perceived such groups as exploiting the vulnerable for monetary gain, recruiting and brainwashing youth, promoting antidemocratic ideologies, and denying the legitimacy of government authority. There were occasional television/radio shows and reports featuring victims, or relatives and friends of such victims, who claimed to be exploited by a group termed a "sect," or a Satanic or esoteric movement. During 2006 there were 32 cases of discrimination based on religion brought before the Equal Rights Commissioner. Some observers believed the existence of and the activities of the Federal Office of Sect Issues and similar offices at the state level foster societal discrimination against minority religious groups.

Members of groups that the Government considers to be "sects" continued to complain that the Government lacks an objective stance when dealing with them. The "sects" claimed that the Government relies too heavily on isolated cases of persons who have had negative experiences with a group, rather than speaking directly to the vast majority of members who make no complaint. Societal prejudice could also be a problem; a poll in 2006 found that 90 percent of Austrians believed sects are "inherently dangerous."

The Church of Scientology reported that individual Scientologists experienced discrimination in hiring in the private sector. Jehovah's Witnesses complained about a brochure issued by the Christian Trade Unionists that mischaracterized the Witnesses as a sect.

In a guidebook for doctors working at schools, the Jehovah's Witnesses are listed as one of the confessional communities in the country but are also listed as a sect.

Muslims complained about incidents of societal discrimination and verbal harassment. Muslim women reported difficulties in the job market when potential employers learned they wore a headscarf. In 2004 the Equal Treatment Bill that implemented the EU Anti-Discrimination and Anti-Racism Guidelines took effect, allowing such victims to take action in court. Women who wore the headscarf also reported that they experienced harassment in public areas.

In October 2006 graffiti crosses were painted on the walls of the Muslim cemetery under construction in Vienna's Liesing district. During the campaign for the October 1, 2006, national parliamentary elections, the Islamic Community also noted anti-Islamic slogans from the right wing Freedom Party.

Compulsory school curricula provide for anti-bias and tolerance education as part of the civics education and as a focus across various subjects, including history and German classes. The Ministry of Education also conducts training projects with the Anti-Defamation League in this context.

Relations among the 13 officially recognized religious societies are generally amicable. Fourteen Christian churches, among them the Roman Catholic Church, various Protestant confessions, and eight Orthodox and old-oriental churches were engaged in a dialogue in the framework of the Ecumenical Council of Austrian Churches. The Baptists and the Salvation Army have observer status in the Council. The international Catholic organization Pro Oriente, which promotes a dialogue with the Orthodox churches, was also active in the country.

At the end of the reporting period, construction continued on the new Islamic cemetery in Vienna's Liesing district, which was expected to be completed in late 2007. An Islamic cemetery was also scheduled to be opened in the state of Vorarlberg in late 2007.

On December 6, 2006, stories in the press and the BBC reported on a study conducted by political scientists at the University of Vienna about Muslim extremism in Vienna that found that 97 percent of young Muslims participating indicated that violence had no place in spreading Islam. On September 22, 2006, in reaction to the controversy surrounding Pope Benedict XVI's comments on Islam, the Catholic Church and the Muslim Community organized a "Day of Dialogue" in contrast to the "Day of Wrath" proclaimed on Al Jazeera for the same day. On March 22, 2006, a new interreligious platform for tolerance was presented to the public. Billed as an "initiative for a cooperative future in Austria," the group, "Christians and Muslims," seeks to promote tolerance and respect by encouraging Christians and Muslims to learn more about each other's faiths and each other. Subsequently, Jewish representatives also joined the platform.

Holocaust education was generally taught as part of history instruction, but also was featured in other subjects under the heading "political education (civics)." Religious education classes were another forum for teaching the tenets of different religions and overall tolerance. Special teacher training seminars were available on the subject of Holocaust education. The Education Ministry also ran a program through which Holocaust survivors talked to school classes about National Socialism and the Holocaust.

In 2019, the ÖVP-FPÖ government introduced a headscarf ban applying to girls in primary school under 10 years old. Austria's Constitutional Court overturned the ban, ruling that it discriminated against Muslim girls and violated religious neutrality. On September 10, 2025, the ÖVP-SPÖ-NEOS government announced a new proposed ban for girls under 14. Austria's National Council passed the new legislation and the ban entered into force on September 1, 2026.

== See also ==
- Religion in Austria
- Human rights in Austria
