= Religion in Austria =

Religion in Austria (2021)
1. Catholicism (55.2%)
2. Eastern Orthodoxy (4.90%)
3. Protestantism (3.80%)
4. Old Catholicism (0.10%)
5. Other Christians (4.20%)
6. No religion (22.4%)
7. Islam (8.30%)
8. Buddhism (0.30%)
9. Hinduism (0.10%)
10. Judaism (0.10%)
11. Other religions (0.70%)

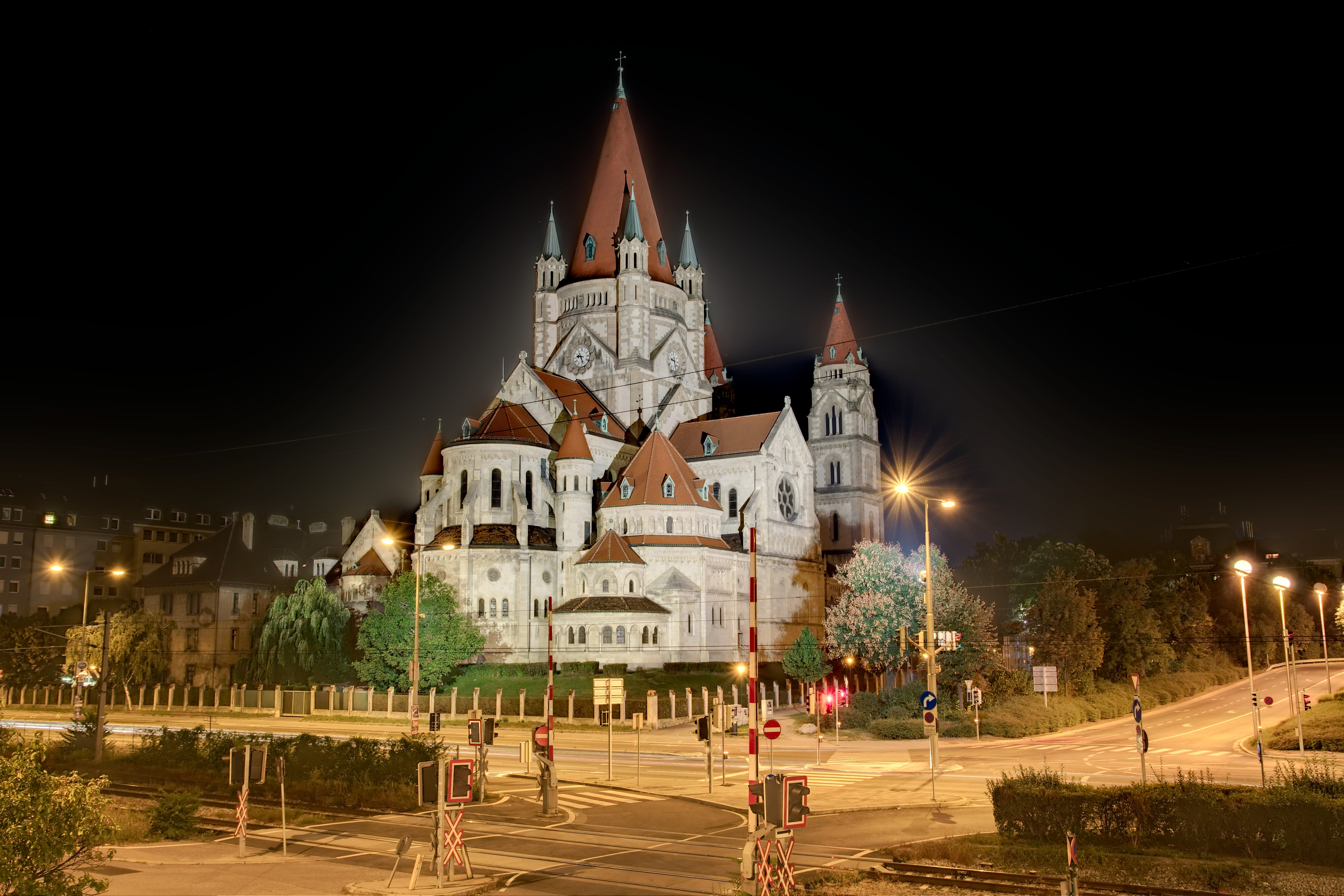
St. Francis of Assisi Church in Vienna

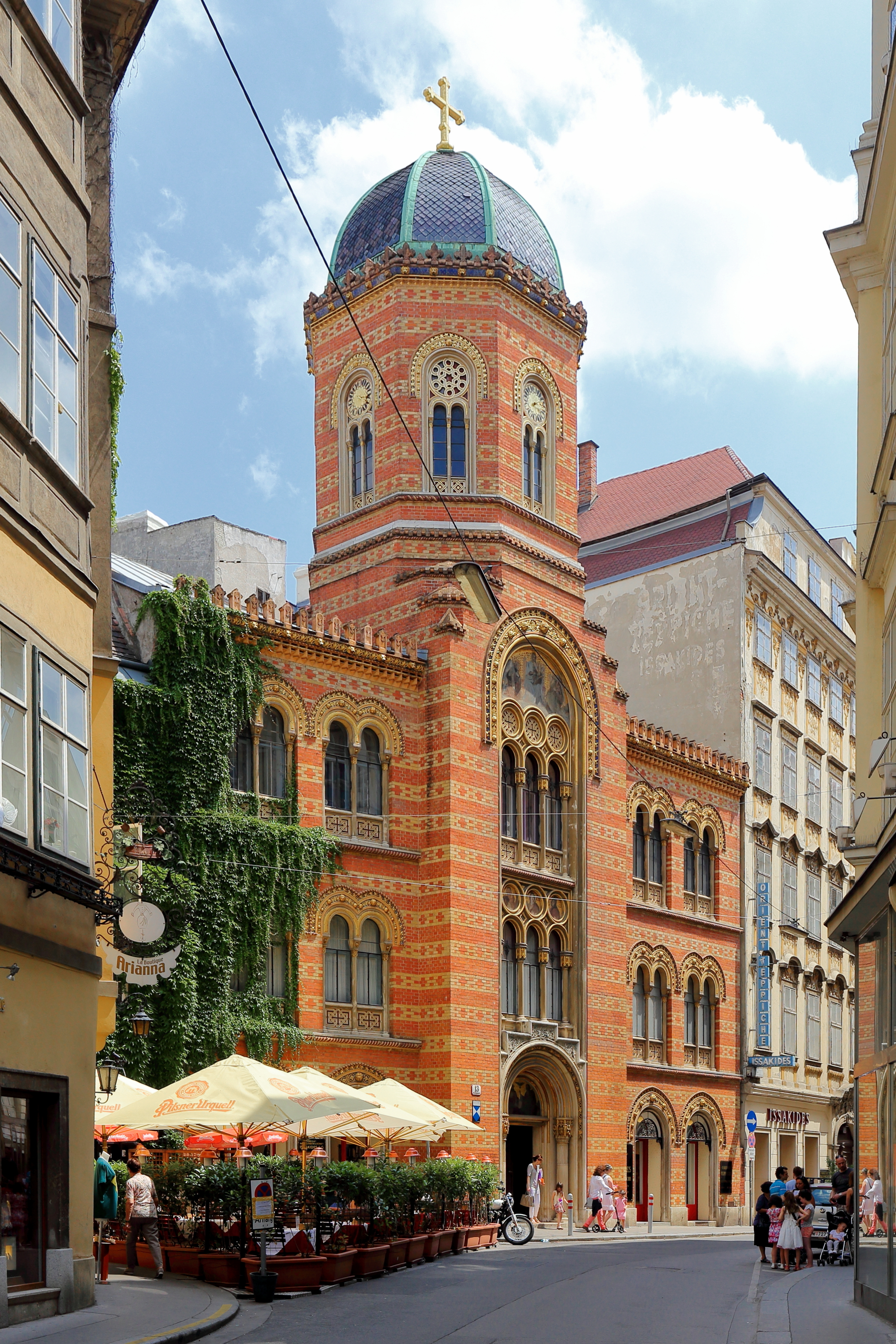
Holy Trinity Greek Orthodox Church in Vienna

Religion in Austria is predominantly Christianity, adhered to by 68.2% of the country's population according to the 2021 national survey (Note: Since 2011, Statistics Austria switched the census methodology from the traditional face-to-face and module-based census to a register-based census; the latter does not allow populations to be directly queried about certain topics, such as religious affiliation. As a consequence, the 2011 census did not provide information about the religious affiliations of Austrians. In 2021, Statistics Austria adopted a combined census methodology, and the question about religion was introduced again through a microcensus, or national survey, complementing the register-based census.) conducted by Statistics Austria. Among Christians, 80.9% were Catholics, 7.2% were Orthodox Christians (mostly belonging to the Eastern Orthodox Church), 5.6% were Protestants, while the remaining 6.2% were other Christians, belonging to other denominations of the religion or not affiliated to any denomination. In the same census, 8.3% of the Austrians declared that their religion was Islam, 1.2% declared to believe in other non-Christian religions (including Buddhism, Hindusim, Judaism and others), and 22.4% declared they did not belong to any religion, denomination or religious community.

According to church membership data, in 2024 49.6% of the population were Catholics. This was the first time less than half of Austrians was a member of the Catholic Church. Around 3% adhered to Protestant churches.

Austria was historically a strongly Catholic country, having been the centre of the Habsburg monarchy (1273–1918) which championed Catholicism. Although in the 16th century many Austrians converted to Protestantism, Lutheranism in particular, as the Protestant Reformation (begun in 1517) was spreading across Europe, the Habsburgs enacted measures of Counter-Reformation as early as 1527 and harshly repressed Austrian Protestantism, albeit a minority of Austrians remained Protestant. A few decades after the fall of the Habsburg monarchy at the end of the World War I, and the transformation of Austria into a federal republic, at least since the 1970s there has been a decline of Christianity (with the exception of Orthodox churches) and a proliferation of other religions, a process which has been particularly pronounced in the capital state of Vienna.

Between the censuses of 1971 and 2021, Christianity declined from 93.8% to 68.2% of the Austrian population (Catholicism from 87.4% to 55.2%, and Protestantism from 6% to 3.8%, while Orthodox Christianity grew from 2.2% to 4.9% between 2001 and 2021). During the same timespan, Islam grew from being the religion of 0.2% to 8.3% of the Austrian population, and the proportion of people neither affiliating with nor belonging to any religion grew from 4.3% to 22.4%.

== Demographics ==
=== Census statistics, 1951–2021 ===
Religious affiliations in Austria, census 1951–2021*
Religion	1951		1961		1971		1981		1991		2001		2021	
Religion	Number	%	Number	%	Number	%	Number	%	Number	%	Number	%	Number	%
Christianity	6,632,500	95.7	6,763,400	95.6	7,022,400	93.8	6,821,300	90.2	6,489,100	83.2	6,485,700	80.7	6,093,700	68.2
—Catholicism	6,170,100	89.0	6,295,100	89.0	6,548,300	87.4	6,372,600	84.3	6,081,500	78.0	5,915,400	73.6	4,933,300	55.2
—Orthodox Christianity**	–	–	–	–	–	–	–	–	–	–	179,500	2.2	436,700	4.9
—Protestantism	429,500	6.2	438,700	6.2	447,100	6.0	423,200	5.6	388,700	5.0	376,200	4.7	340,300	3.8
—Old Catholicism	32,900	0.5	29,600	0.4	27,000	0.4	25,500	0.3	18,900	0.2	14,600	0.2	4,900	0.1
—Other Christians	–	–	–	–	–	–	–	–	–	–	–	–	378,500	4.2
Islam**	–	–	–	–	22,300	0.3	76,900	1.0	158,800	2.0	339,000	4.2	745,600	8.3
Buddhism***	–	–	–	–	–	–	–	–	–	–	10,400	0.1	26,600	0.3
Hinduism***	–	–	–	–	–	–	–	–	–	–	3,600	0.0	10,100	0.1
Judaism	11,200	0.2	9,000	0.1	8,500	0.1	7,100	0.1	7,300	0.1	8,100	0.1	5,400	0.1
Other religions	23,100	0.3	31,400	0.4	74,400	1.0	118,900	1.6	197,400	2.5	62,200	0.9	62,100	0.7
No religion	264,000	3.8	266,000	3.8	321,200	4.3	452,000	6.0	672,300	8.6	963,300	12.0	1,997,700	22.4
Not stated	3,100	0.0	4,000	0.1	42,800	0.6	79,000	1.0	271,000	3.5	160,700	2.0	–	–
Total population	6,933,900		7,073,800		7,491,500		7,555,300		7,795,800		8,032,900		8,935,800	
*1951–2001: religious affiliations of the entire population counted in the census. 2021-: religious affiliations counted in a microcensus and extrapolated to the total population. **Orthodox Christianity and Islam were counted as part of "other religions" until, respectively, the censuses of 1971 and 2001, in which they began to be counted separately. ***Buddhism and Hinduism were counted separately, albeit only in some data reports, at least since the census of 2001.

=== Line chart of the trends, 1951–2021 ===
Census statistics 1951–2021:
View source data.

=== Religion by federal state ===
Religious affiliations in Austria by federal state, 2021 national survey
Federal state	Christianity total		of which						Islam		Other religions		No religion	
Federal state	Christianity total		Catholicism		Orthodox Christianity		Protestantism		Islam		Other religions		No religion	
Federal state	Number	%	Number	%	Number	%	Number	%	Number	%	Number	%	Number	%
Burgenland	237,900	80.3	194,100	65.5	8,000	2.7	33,700	11.4	6,400	2.2	2,100	0.7	49,900	16.8
Carinthia	434,500	77.2	356,900	63.4	20,700	3.7	41,800	7.4	31,100	5.5	3,900	0.7	93,100	16.5
Lower Austria	1.242,000	73.4	983,100	58.1	49,000	2.9	56,700	3.3	83,200	4.9	21,500	1.3	346,500	20.5
Upper Austria	1.098,600	73.4	931,300	62.3	43,000	2.9	48,500	3.2	125,500	8.4	12,800	0.9	259,200	17.3
Salzburg	415,500	74.2	322,000	57.5	28,100	5.0	17,100	3.0	36,400	6.5	6,600	1.2	101,900	18.2
Styria	894,300	71.7	789,300	63.3	34,100	2.7	39,600	3.2	63,400	5.1	8,400	0.7	281,500	22.6
Tyrol	556,300	73.2	502,600	66.2	23,400	3.1	22,700	3.0	65,900	8.7	2,500	0.3	134,800	17.8
Vienna	942,000	49.0	611,700	31.8	215,200	11.2	70,300	3.7	284,900	14.8	38,700	2.0	655,400	34.1
Vorarlberg	272,700	68.3	242,400	60.7	15,100	3.8	10,000	2.5	48,800	12.2	2,500	0.6	75,400	18.9

== History ==
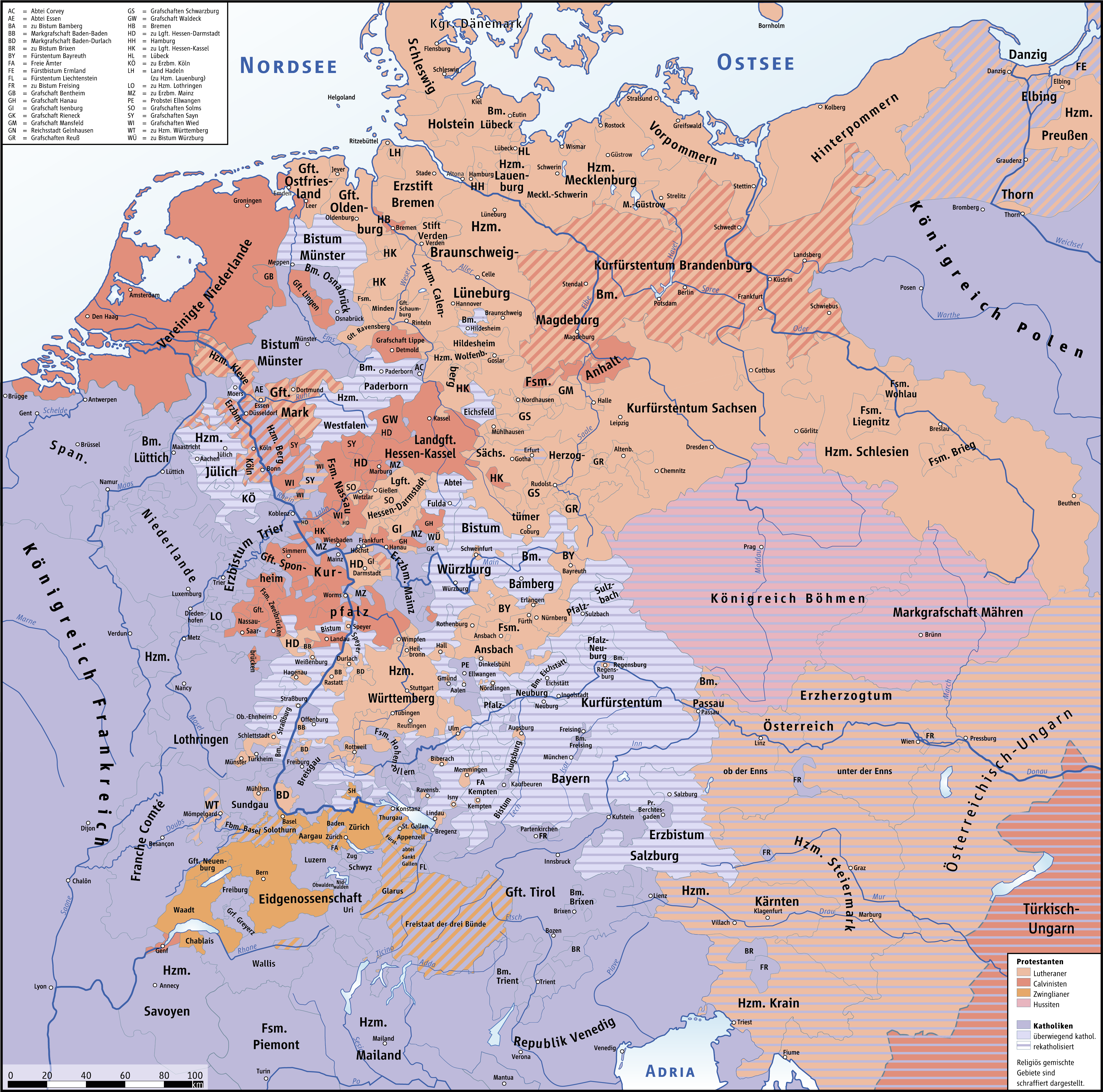
Much of eastern Austria adopted Lutheranism until counterreformational efforts changed it in the late 16th century.

The Protestant Reformation spread from northern Germany to Austria. By the Council of Trent in 1545, almost half of the Austrian population had converted to Lutheranism, while a minority also endorsed Calvinism. Eastern Austria was more affected by this phenomenon than western Austria. After 1545, Austria was recatholicized in the Counter Reformation. The Habsburgs imposed a strict regime to restore the influence of the Catholic Church among Austrians and their campaign proved successful. The Habsburgs for a long time viewed themselves as the vanguard of Catholicism, while all the other Christian confessions and religions were repressed.

In 1775, Maria Theresa gave official permission to the Mechitarist Congregation of the Armenian Catholic Church to settle in the Habsburg Empire.

In 1781, during the Austrian Enlightenment, Emperor Joseph II issued a Patent of Tolerance for Austria that allowed other confessions a limited freedom of worship. Religious freedom was declared a constitutional right in Cisleithania after the Austro-Hungarian Ausgleich in 1867, thus paying tribute to the fact that the monarchy was home to numerous religions besides Catholicism such as Greek, Serbian, Romanian, Russian, and Bulgarian Orthodox Christians (Austria neighboured the Ottoman Empire for centuries), both Calvinist and Lutheran Protestants, and Jews. In 1912, after the annexation of Bosnia Hercegovina in 1908, Islam was officially recognised in Austria.

The Austrian Jewish community of 1938—Vienna alone counted more than 200,000—was reduced to around 4,500 during the Second World War, with about 65,000 Jewish Austrians killed in the Holocaust and 130,000 emigrating. The large majority of the current Jewish population are post-war immigrants, particularly from eastern Europe and central Asia (including Bukharan Jews). Buddhism was legally recognised as a religion in Austria in 1983.

Austria was greatly affected by the Protestant Reformation, to a point where a significant part of the population became Protestant. Lutheranism was the most successful Protestant confession; that was the case among other German-speaking populations across the Holy Roman Empire and Austria was indeed one of them. Calvinism did not receive that much support. The prominent position of the Habsburgs in the Counter-Reformation, however, saw Protestantism all but wiped out beginning in 1545, restoring Catholicism as the dominant religion once more.

The significant Jewish population (around 200,000 in 1938), mainly residing in Vienna, was reduced to just a couple of thousand through mass emigration in 1938 (more than 2/3 of the Jewish population emigrated from 1938 until 1941), and the following Holocaust during the Nazi period. Immigration in more recent years, primarily from Turkey and the former Yugoslavia, has led to an increased number of Muslims and Serbian Orthodox Christians. As in other European countries, there has been a growth of Pagan movements in Austria in recent years.

According to church membership data, in 2024 49.6% of the population were Catholics. This was the first time less than half of Austrians was a member of the Catholic Church.

== Religions ==
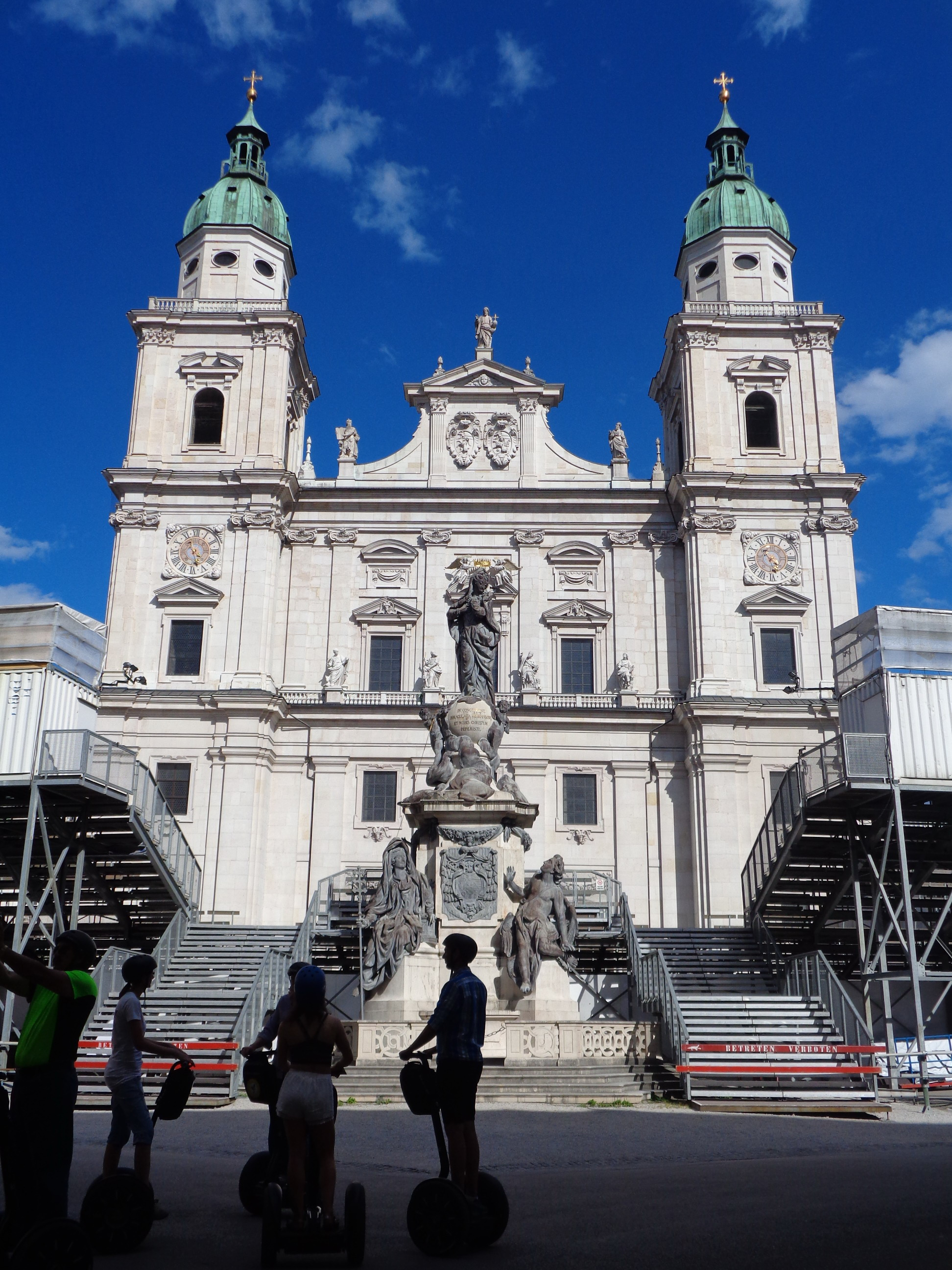
Cathedral of Saints Rupert and Vergilius in Salzburg

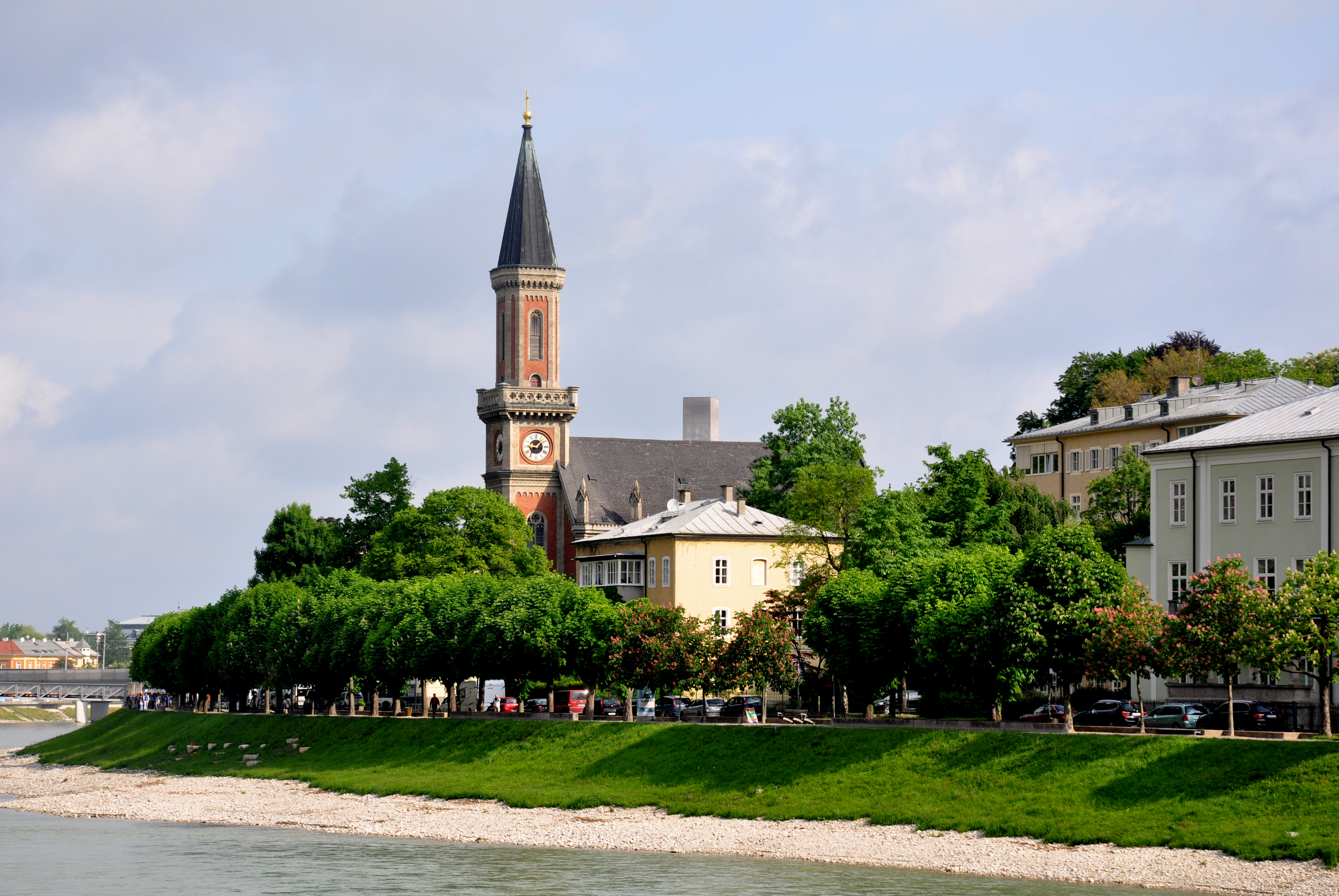
The Lutheran Christuskirche (Church of Christ) in Salzburg.

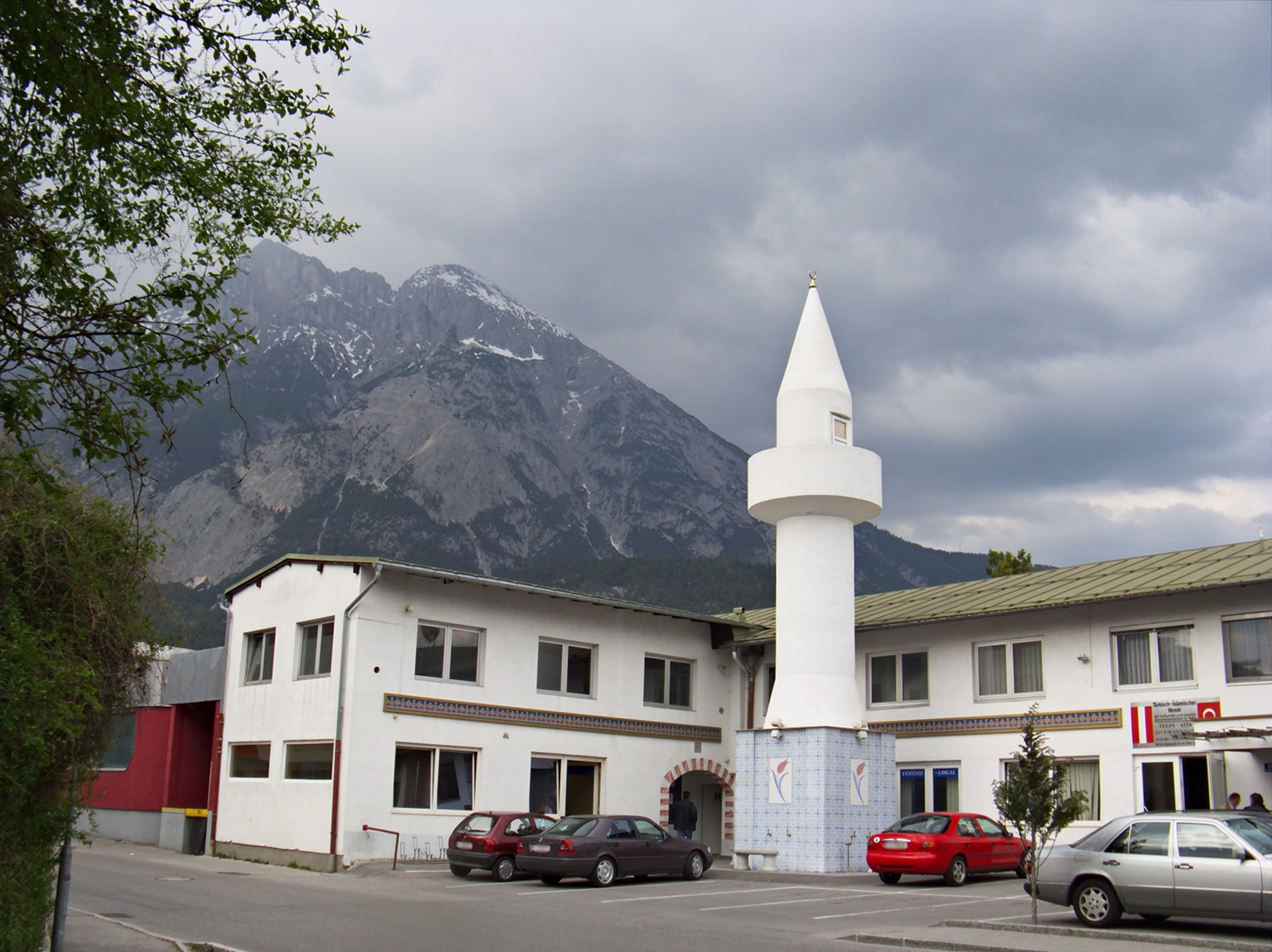
A mosque in Telfs.

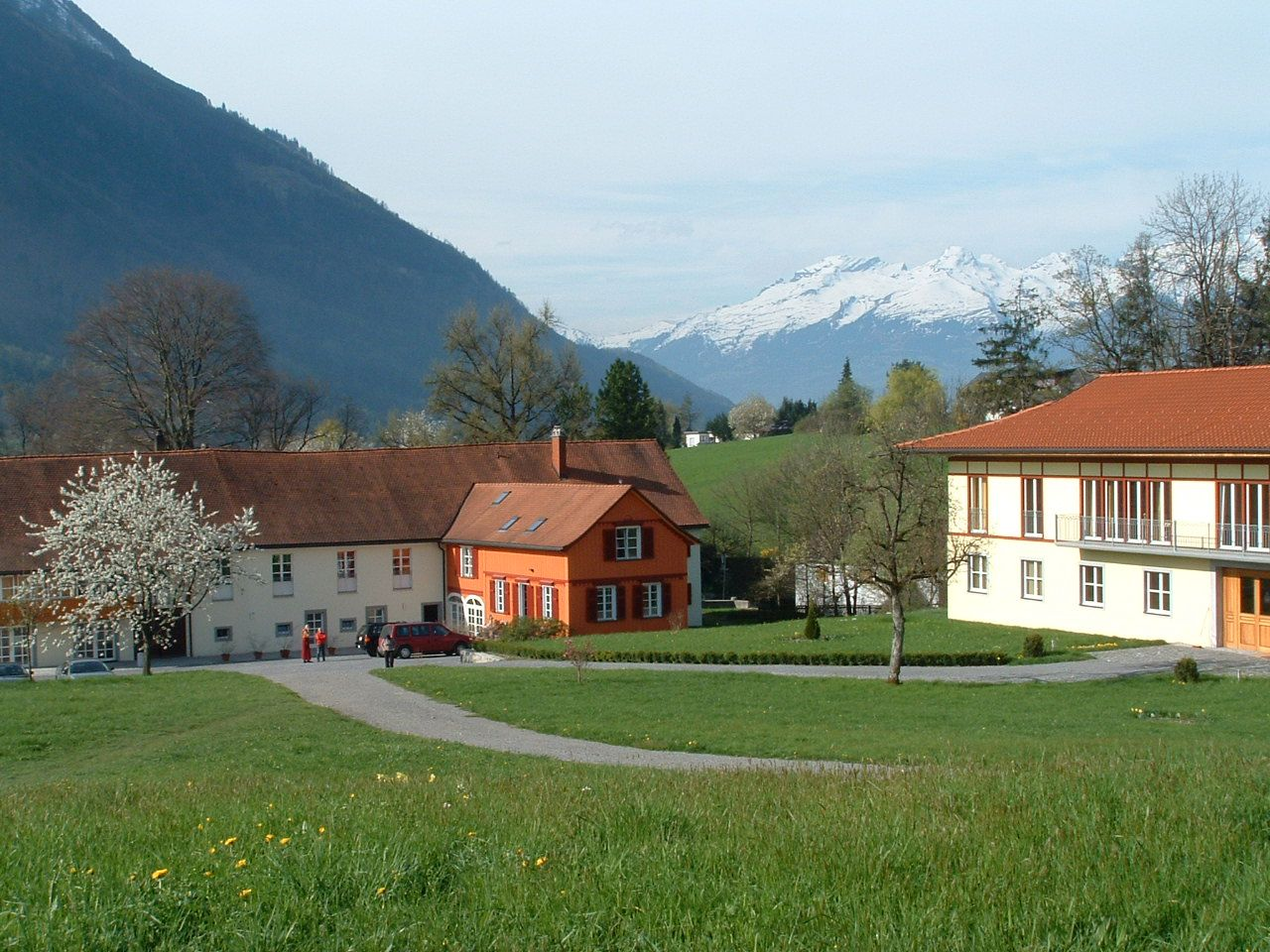
Letzehof Buddhist Monastery at Feldkirch, in Vorarlberg.

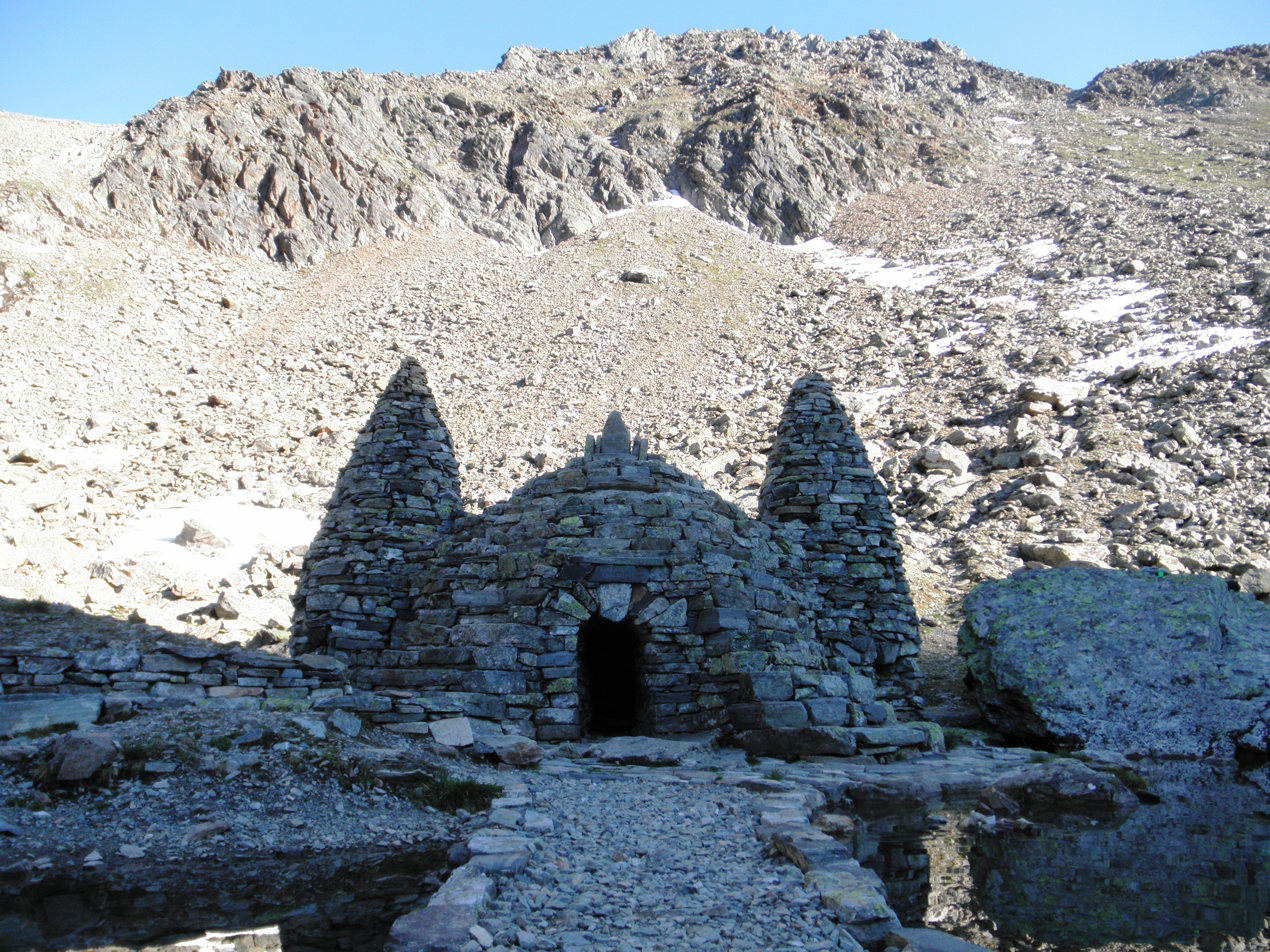
The Temple of Apollo at Hundstalsee, built by local artists in honour of the Greek god Apollo.

=== Christianity ===
==== Catholicism ====
Catholicism is the largest religion in Austria, representing 49.6% of the total population in 2024. The Catholic Church's governing body in Austria is the Austrian Conference of Catholic Bishops, made up of the hierarchy of the two archbishops (Vienna, Salzburg), the bishops and the abbot of territorial abbey of Wettingen-Mehrerau. Nevertheless, each bishop is independent in his own diocese, answerable only to the Pope. The current president of the Conference of Catholic Bishops is Cardinal Christoph Schönborn, who belongs to the Central European noble family of Schönborn. Although Austria has no primate, the archbishop of Salzburg is titled Primus Germaniae (Primate of Germany).

==== Orthodoxy ====
Eastern Orthodox and Oriental Orthodox churches grew over the last decades due to the coming of South Slavic immigrants from the Balkans to Austria. The largest group of Eastern Orthodox in Austria are Serbs. The Vienna Institute of Demography of the Austrian Academy of Sciences estimated in that there were 397,219 Eastern Orthodox Christians in Austria in 2016, representing 4.6% of the total population.

==== Protestantism ====
The Protestant Reformation spread from northern Germany to Austria. By the Council of Trent in 1545, almost half of the Austrian population had converted to Lutheranism, while a much smaller minority also endorsed Calvinism. Eastern Austria was more affected by this phenomenon than western Austria. After 1545, Austria was recatholicized in the Counter Reformation. The Habsburgs imposed a strict regime to restore the influence of the Catholic Church among Austrians and their campaign proved successful; the Habsburgs for a long time viewed themselves as the vanguard of Catholicism, while all the other Christian confessions and religions were suppressed.

Protestantism reached a peak percentage of 6.2% by 1951 for the first time in Austrian history since the success of the Counter-Reformation. Currently, it claims around 3.5% of the population. Austrian Protestants are overwhelmingly Lutheran (3.4%), with a small Reformed community (0.1%). New arriving Protestant churches are growing in membership, especially Evangelical Protestants and Pentecostals.

A study from the Vienna Institute of Demography of the Austrian Academy of Sciences found that there were an estimate of 412,423 Protestants of all types in Austria in 2016. The Lutheran Protestant Church of the Augsburg Confession in Austria has about 300,000 (3.4%) members. The Reformed Church in Austria, a Calvinist body, has roughly 13,590 members.

The Mennonite World Conference counted a small Mennonite population in Austria. In 2022, there were 402 Mennonites.

The German Yearly Meeting of Quakers includes Quakers in both Germany and Austria and numbered less than 500 in 2017.

=== Islam ===
Due to immigration, especially from the Balkans, Turkey and the Middle East, the number of Muslims in Austria has grown exponentially over the latest decades, with an estimated number of Muslims of 686,599, or 7.9% of the total population as of 2016, up from 4.2% in 2001.

Number of Muslims in Austria
Year	Absolute number	Percentage	Source
1981	76,939	1.0%	
1991	158,776	2.0%	
2001	345,906	4.1%	
2009	515,914	6.2%	
2016	686,599	7.9%	
2021	745,600	8.3%	

=== Buddhism ===
Buddhism is a legally recognized religion in Austria and it is followed by thousands of people. Although still small in absolute numbers (10,402 at the 2001 census), Buddhism enjoys widespread acceptance in Austria. A majority of Buddhists in the country are Austrian nationals (some of them naturalized after immigration from Asia, predominantly from China and Vietnam), while a considerable number of them are foreign nationals.

As in most European countries, different branches and schools of Buddhism are represented by groups of varying sizes. Vienna not only has the largest number of foreign residents, but is also the place with the longest tradition of Buddhism in the country. Most of Austria's Buddhist temples and centres of practice can be found there; some with a specific Chinese, Vietnamese, Tibetan or Japanese appearance. The latest development has been the establishment of a "Buddhist cemetery" around a stupa-like building for funeral ceremonies at the Vienna Central Cemetery.

=== Hinduism ===
Hinduism is a minority religion in Austria, and according to the 2001 census, it was the religion of 3629 people. Since 1998, the 'Hindu Community in Austria' (HRÖ), the official representative of Hindus in Austria, has been able to call itself an 'Official registered confessional community', yet does not enjoy full legal recognition from the state.

=== Paganism ===
Austria has seen a growth of Pagan movements in recent years, especially Druidic (Druidentum), but also Germanic Heathen (Heidentum), Wiccan and Neopagan witchcraft (Hexentum) groups. As of 2010 Austrian motorway authorities have been hiring Druids for geomantic works intended to reduce the number of accidents on the worst stretches of Austrian speedways.

Celtic Neopaganism and Neo-Druids are particularly popular in Austria, by virtue of Austria being the location of the proto-Celtic Hallstatt culture. The Keltendorf in Diex, Kärnten combines archaeological reconstruction with "European geomancy". The Europäische Keltische Gemeinschaft has been active since 1998.

== Irreligion ==
The 2022 published population data documented around 2 million Austrians who did not belong to any religion. According to Pew Research Center in terms of certainty of belief, 29% of the surveyed chose the option of 'Do not believe in God'.

== Church memberships ==
Main denominations in Austria
Year	Population	Catholics	Percentage	Protestants	Percentage
1951	6,933,905	6,170,084	89.0%	429,493	6.2%
1961	7,073,807	6,295,075	89.0%	438,663	6.2%
1971	7,491,526	6,548,316	87.4%	447,070	6.0%
1981	7,555,338	6,372,645	84.3%	423,162	5.6%
1991	7,795,786	6,081,454	78.0%	388,709	5.0%
2001	8,032,926	5,915,421	73.6%	376,150	4.7%
2011	8,408,121	5,403,722	64.3%	319,752	3.8%
2012	8,451,860	5,359,151	63.4%	325,905	3.9%
2013	8,507,786	5,308,515	62.4%	313,352	3.7%
2014	8,584,926	5,265,378	61.4%	309,158	3.6%
2015	8,700,471	5,211,238	59.9%	306,183	3.5%
2016	8,773,686	5,162,622	58.8%	301,729	3.4%
2017	8,823,054	5,112,330	57.9%	296,338	3.4%
2018	8,859,992	5,053,074	57.0%	292,597	3.3%
2019		4,980,000
2022	8,978,929	4,830,000	53.7%

== See also ==
- Buddhism in Austria
- Catholic Church in Austria
- Old Catholic Church of Austria
- Hinduism in Austria
- Islam in Austria
- History of the Jews in Austria
- Religions by country
- Freedom of religion in Austria
