= Hinduism in Austria =

Hindus in Austria
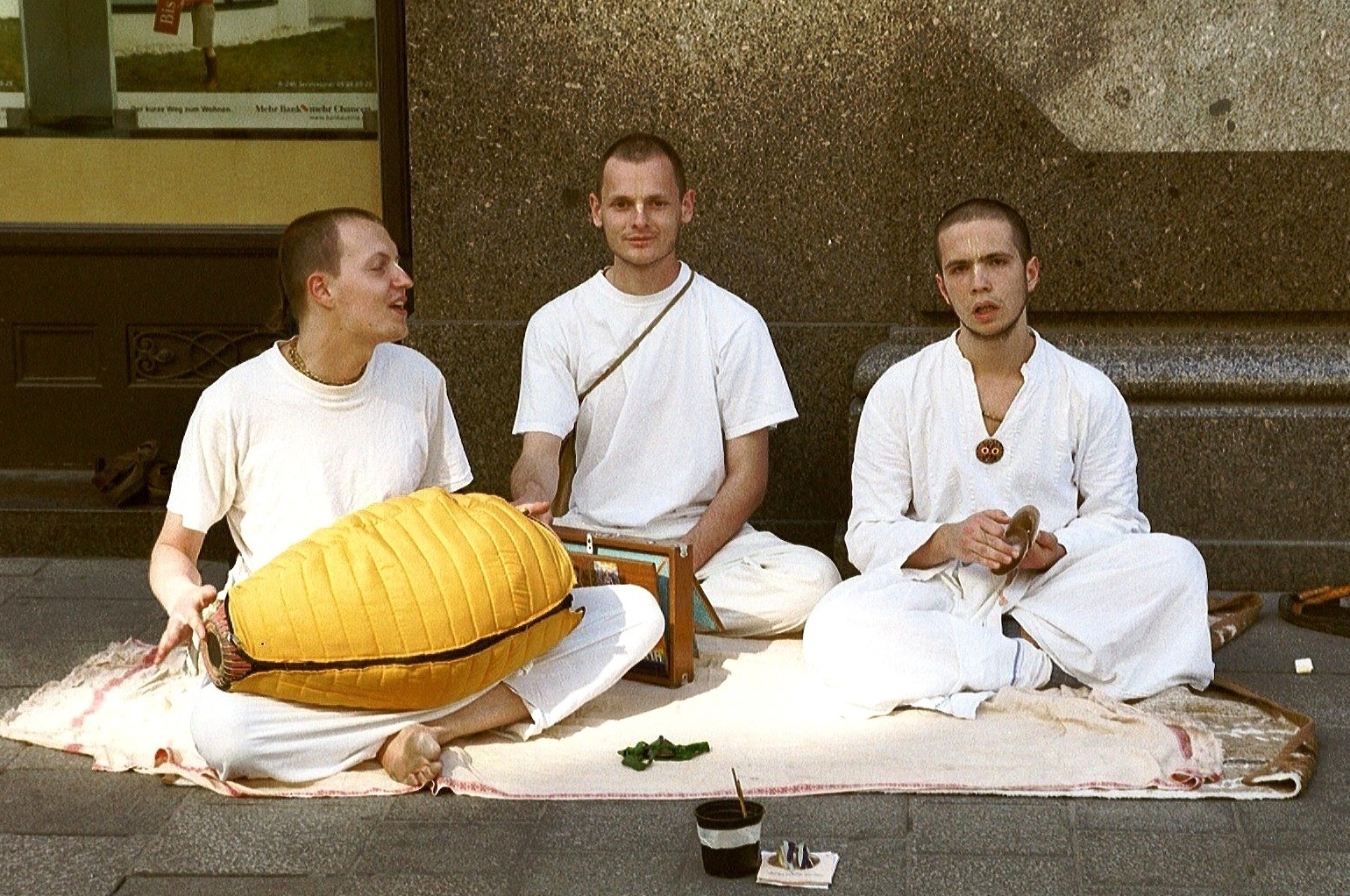
- Hare krishnas in Austria

Regions with significant populations
- All Over Austria

Religions
- Hinduism

Related ethnic groups
- Indians, Nepalese, Bangladeshis, Afghans

Hinduism is a minority religion in Austria and formalized during the 1980s. Austrian Hindus come from diverse backgrounds, originating from different regions of India, as well as Bangladesh, Nepal and Afghanistan. There are several organisations and temples primarily located in Vienna.

== History ==
In 1980 the Dr. Bimal Kundu, an engineer from Bengal, founded the first Hindu religious group in Austria, known as the Hindu Mandir Association, for Hindus who had immigrated from the Indian subcontinent. This led to the establishment of a Hindu mandir at the Afro-Asian institute in Vienna where Hindu religious activities were conducted. The first signs of inter-religious dialogue started in the late 1980s where an Austrian division of the World Conference on Religions and Peace (WRCP) was established, encouraging the discussion of Hinduism and other religions and their influence on Europe. In 1991, the Hindu Mandir Society—Association of Hindus Living in Austria was officially registered and became an important organisation in Vienna. The organisation operates a mandir and plays a major role in presenting Hinduism to the public.

In 1998, the Hindu community gained legal recognition as a state-registered confessional community. The Hindu Religious Society in Austria serves as the official representative for all Hindus in the country.

== Demographics ==
Since 2001, the number of Hindus residing in Austria is unknown as data of religious affiliation is no longer recorded. Austrian Hindus come from various regions of India, particularly Punjab, West-Bengal, Gujarat, Kerala, and Tamil Nadu. Other countries of origin include Bangladesh, Nepal and Afghanistan.

== Hindu organisations ==
According to the Austrian law, the religious communities that are present in the country for 20 years and constitute minimum of 0.2% of country's population are recognised as "religious society". Any religious community with 300 members are recognised as "confessional community". The Hindu Religious Community is recognised as a confessional community.

- Hindu Mandir Association is one of the oldest organisation in Vienna. In 2006, it applied for the status of religious confessional community but soon withdrew their applications and reapplied under the name Hindu Religious Community and was granted the new status.
- Brahma Kumaris World Spiritual University (BKWSU), a new age neo-Hindu spiritual organisation has three centres in Austria, located in Vienna, Graz and Rankweil.
- The Osho movement, Sahaja Yoga, Sai Baba, Sri Chinmoy, Hare Krishna also have a small presence. These organisations are classified as sects by the government for having fewer than 100 members.

== Temples ==
=== Sri Sri Radha Govinda Mandir ===
Located in Vienna and part of the Gaudiya Vaishnava tradition, the temple was founded in the late 1990's by a native Austrian and led by Srila Bhakti Sadhak Muni Maharaj.

=== Sri Hari Om Sanatan Dharm Mandir ===
This temple is located in Salzburg and dedicated to the Hindu goddess, Durga. Initially, it was an extension of a restaurant, accommodating both Hindus and Sikhs, but as of today, the temple is located in the basement of an apartment building.

== See also ==
- Hinduism in Lithuania
- Hinduism in the West
- Religion in Austria
