= Buddhism in Austria =

Buddhism is a legally recognized religion in Austria. Although still small in absolute numbers (10,402 at the 2001 census), Buddhism in Austria enjoys widespread acceptance. A majority of Buddhists in the country are Austrian nationals (some of them naturalized after immigration from Asia, predominantly from the People's Republic of China and Vietnam), while a considerable number of them are foreign nationals.

As in most European countries, different branches and schools of Buddhism are represented by groups of varying sizes. Vienna not only has the largest number of foreign residents, but is also the place with the longest tradition of Buddhism in the country. Most of Austria's Buddhist temples and centres of practice can be found there; some with a specific Chinese, Vietnamese, Tibetan or Japanese appearance. The latest development has been the establishment of a “Buddhist Cemetery” around a stupa-like building for funeral ceremonies at the Vienna Central Cemetery.

Buddhism was officially recognized under Austrian law in 1983. Russia is the only other European country to recognize Buddhism formally as "native" to its own soil, giving it official status, along with Orthodox Christianity, Islam, and Judaism.

== History ==
=== Early years ===
By the late 19th century, due to the influence of Arthur Schopenhauer and Richard Wagner, artists and intellectuals in Vienna had started to take an interest in Buddhism. Karl Eugen Neumann (1865–1915), who had met the composer Wagner in his father's house, took great interest in what he had heard about Buddhism. In 1884 he decided to become a Buddhist and to study the original languages to be able "to see for himself". He translated large parts of the Pali Canon into German before dying in Vienna at the age of 50.

In 1913 in Java, Arthur Fitz, a man from Graz, became the first recorded Austrian to be ordained as a Buddhist monk, taking the name Bhikkhu Sono.

1923 saw the foundation of a "Buddhist Society" in Vienna; and Austrians were among the participants at the 2nd International Buddhist Congress in Paris in 1937. The political situation in Austria — an alliance between the Fascist regime and the Catholic Church from 1933 to 1938 followed by Hitler's conquest of Austria and the Second World War — was highly unfavourable to the development of Austrian Buddhism.

=== Since World War II ===
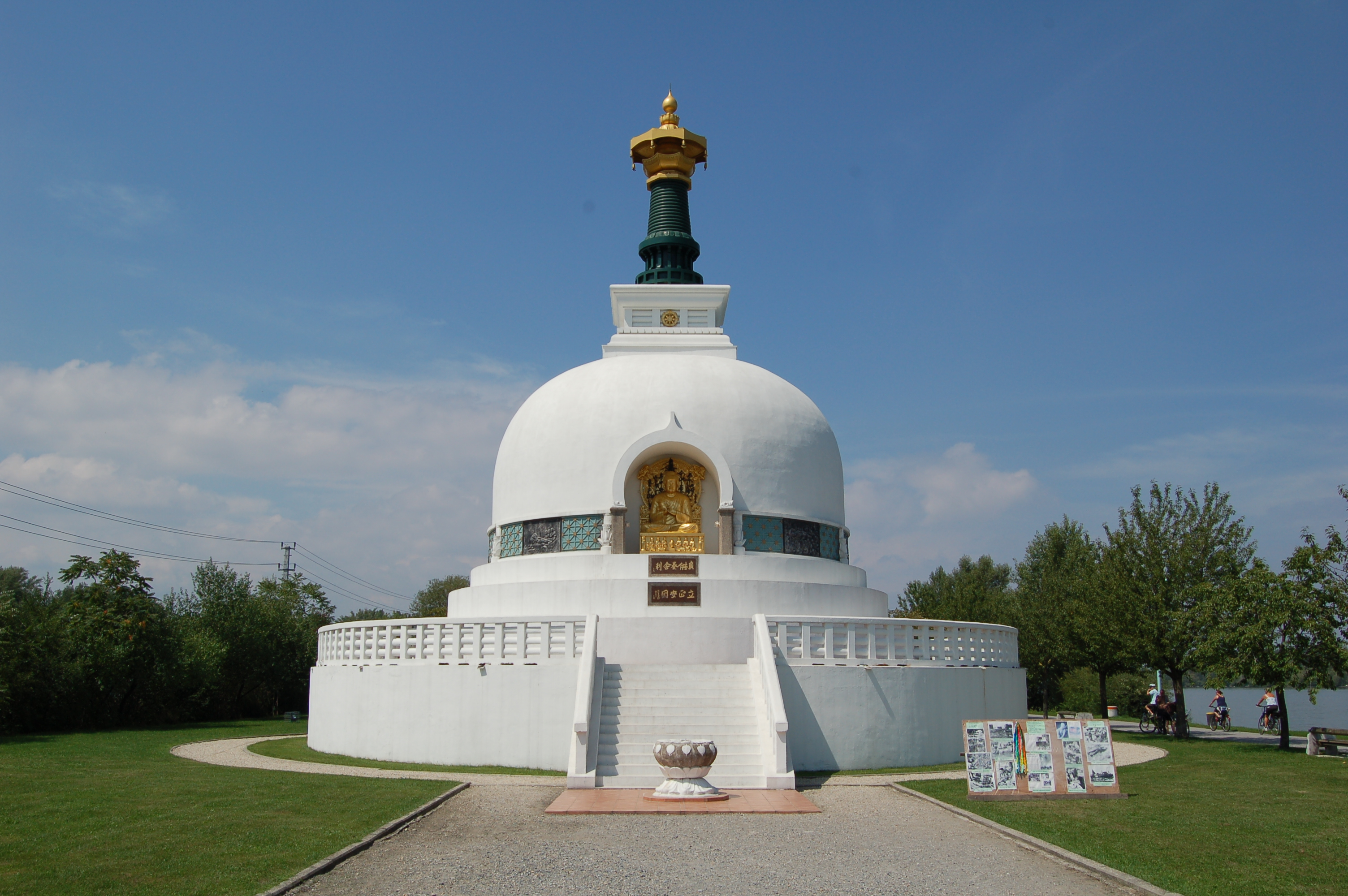
The Peace Pagoda, a stupa in Vienna, Austria.

In 1949 the "Buddhist Society of Vienna" was founded, and interest in Buddhism started to flourish again. Due to personalities like Fritz Hungerleider, who had returned from exile in the People's Republic of China in 1955 to become the society's president, and Dr Walter Karwath, who had spent years in Asia practicing medicine, Buddhism took a step out of literary and intellectual circles toward the broader world. The late 1970s saw the establishment of Dannebergplatz, the first Buddhist Centre in Vienna; the purchase of a rural property intended to become a retreat centre (Buddhist Centre Scheibbs); and the establishment of the first Buddhist Association outside Vienna (the Salzburg Buddhist Association), founded by Friedrich Fenzl, who had been a student at the Ryukoku University in Kyoto and who invited Kosho Otani, the Patriarch of the Nishi-Honganji branch of Jodo Shinshu, to visit Austria. Hemaloka Thero, Geshe Rabten, the 16th Karmapa, the 14th Dalai Lama and other eminent representatives from different Buddhist traditions visited the country, gave talks, and attracted dharma students.

In 1979, Genro Koudela, who was ordained as a Zen priest in California by Joshu Sasaki, returned to Vienna, his city of origin, and established the "Bodhidharma Zendo" there. The new Buddhist Centre at Fleischmarkt, in the very centre of Vienna, became the home for Zen, Kagyu and Theravada groups.

Since 1981 there is a branch of the Arya Maitreya Mandala in Austria, which was founded by Lama Anagarika Govinda.

=== Buddhism recognized ===
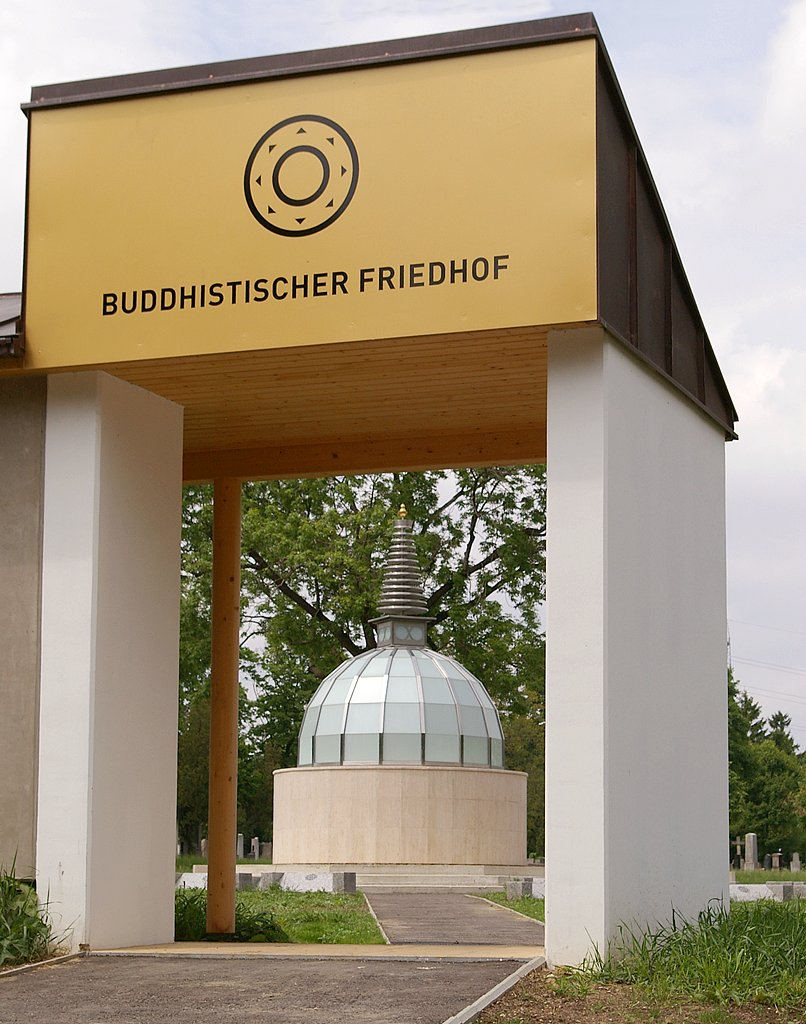
Buddhist Cemetery at the Vienna Zentralfriedhof

Official recognition by the government in early 1983 ushered in a new era of Austrian Buddhism. A widely visible "Peace Stupa" was opened on the banks of the river Danube; and a retreat and study centre, Letzehof, affiliated with the Geluk school of Tibetan Buddhism, was opened in the western province of Vorarlberg. Vanja Palmers, a Zen monk of the Japanese Sōtō school, and Brother David Steindl-Rast, an Austrian-American Benedictine monk, founded a retreat centre high up in the Salzburg alpine region. The first centre in the south of the country, a retreat centre in the Burmese Theravada tradition, was established in the early 1990s.

In 1993, Austria hosted an annual general meeting of the European Buddhist Union, which drew participants from a dozen European countries. A series of visits to the city of Graz by the Dalai Lama in 1995, 1998 (for the consecration of a large stupa), and in 2002 (to speak on "Kalachakra for World Peace") were a strong encouragement for Buddhists in Austria.

=== Buddhist religious instruction at Austrian schools ===
Official recognition also opened the doors for Buddhist religious education at schools. In 1993, the first few groups of children were given the chance to hear about the Buddhadharma on a regular basis as part of their syllabus. Twelve years after the project was started in the cities of Vienna, Graz and Salzburg, Buddhist religious education is being made available to school children of all age groups (6 to 19) at different types of schools in all of nine federal provinces of the Republic. A Teachers’ Training Academy was founded in 2001 to offer in-service teacher training for the teachers concerned.

== See also ==
- Culture of Austria
