= Egon Schiele =

Austrian painter (1890–1918)

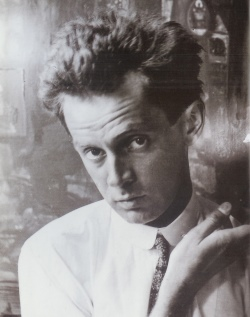
- Schiele in 1918
- Born: Egon Leo Adolf Ludwig Schiele; 12 June 1890; Tulln an der Donau, Austria-Hungary
- Died: 31 October 1918 (aged 28); Vienna, Austria-Hungary
- Education: Akademie der Bildenden Künste
- Known for: Painting, drawing, printmaking
- Notable work: Seated Woman with Bent Knees; Cardinal and Nun; Death and the Maiden; The Family
- Movement: Expressionism

Signature
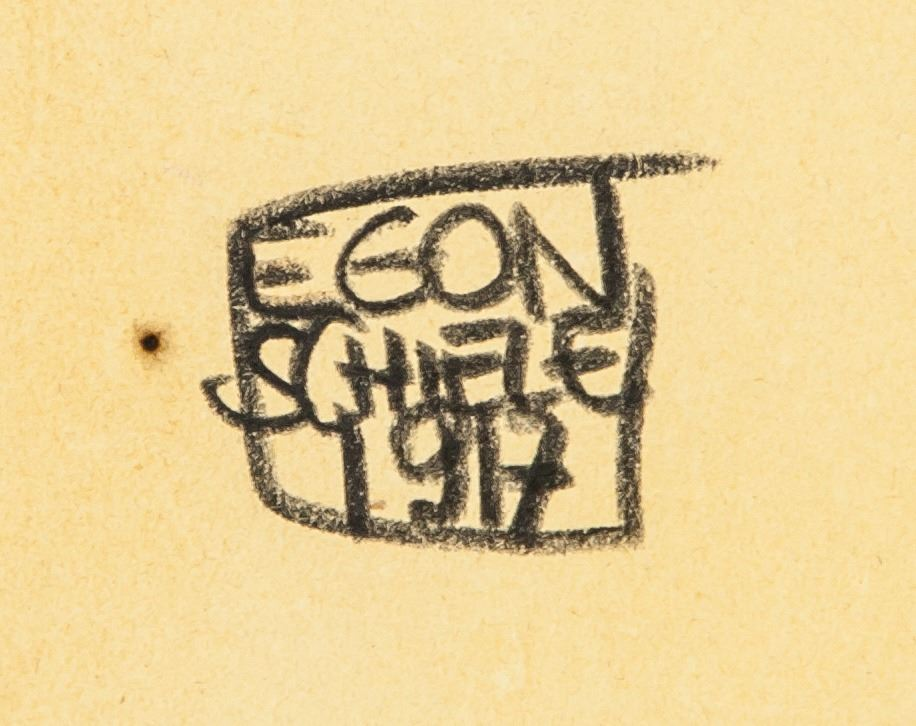

Egon Leo Adolf Ludwig Schiele (German: [ˈeːɡɔn ˈʃiːlə]; 12 June 1890 – 31 October 1918) was an Austrian Expressionist painter. His work is noted for its intensity and its raw sexuality, and for the many self-portraits the artist produced, including nude self-portraits. The twisted body shapes and the expressive line that characterise Schiele's paintings and drawings mark the artist as an early exponent of Expressionism. Gustav Klimt, a figurative painter of the early 20th century, was a mentor to Schiele.

== Biography ==
=== Early life ===
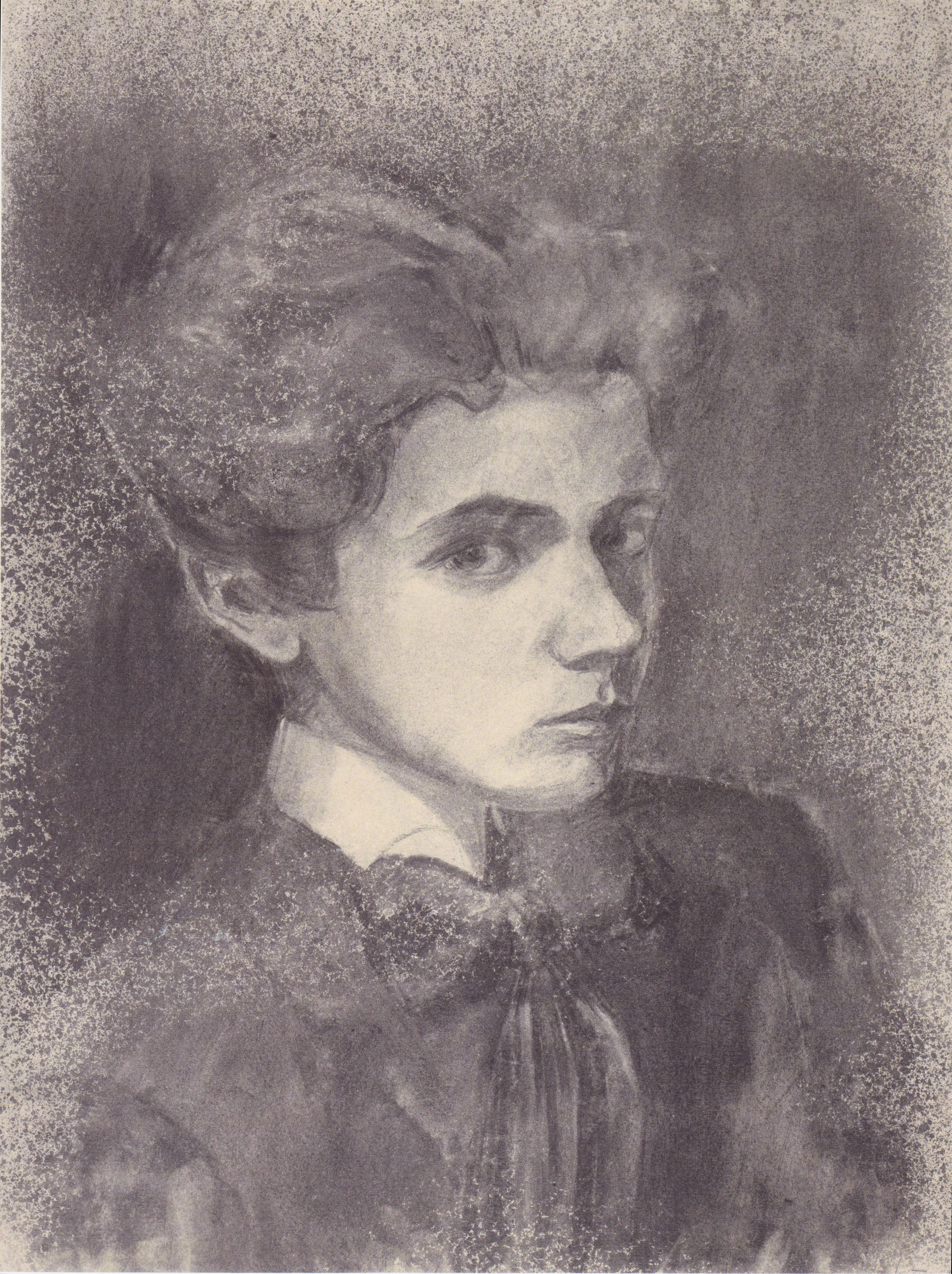
Self-portrait, 1906 (aged 16)

Egon Leo Adolf Ludwig Schiele was born on 12 June 1890 in Tulln, Lower Austria. His father, Adolf Schiele, the stationmaster of the Tulln station of the Austrian Federal Railways, had been born in Vienna in 1851, to Karl Ludwig Schiele (a German from Ballenstedt) and Aloisia Schimak; Egon's mother, Marie (née Soukup), had been born in Český Krumlov (Krumau) in 1861, to Franz Soukup (a Czech from Mirkovice), and Aloisia Poferl (a German Bohemian) from Český Krumlov. Schiele had three sisters, Elvira, Melanie, and Gertrude. Elvira died as a child of congenital syphilis. Before Egon's birth, his mother had suffered the stillbirths of three sons.

According to family lore, Adolf Schiele had contracted syphilis during his honeymoon in Trieste, when he had visited a brothel after his new wife, scared of the consummation of the marriage, fled their bedroom. When the couple did have intercourse a few days later, her husband unknowingly passed the disease to his wife. As a child, the younger Schiele was fascinated by trains and would spend many hours drawing them. Seeing Schiele's drawing as a detriment to his son's schoolwork, his father destroyed these sketchbooks.

The elder Schiele was known to have had an interest in collecting minerals and butterflies, and also liked to draw. But the younger Schiele's family life was instead deeply influenced by his father's illness, which, as the syphilis progressed, left him in a state of mental confusion and would often cast him into fits of rage.

When he was 11 years old, Schiele moved to the nearby city of Krems (and later to Klosterneuburg) to attend secondary school. To those around him, Schiele was regarded as a strange child. Shy and reserved, he did poorly at school except in athletics and drawing, and was usually in classes made up of younger pupils. He also displayed a sexual interest in his younger sister Gertrude (who was known as Gerti), and his father once broke down the locked door of a room that Egon and Gerti were in to see what they were doing, only to discover them developing film. When Egon was sixteen, he took the twelve-year-old Gerti by train to Trieste without permission and spent a night in a hotel room with her.

=== Academy of Fine Arts ===
When Schiele was 14 years old, his father died from syphilis, and the family, which had been fairly wealthy, was left impoverished. Before his death, Schiele's father, in a fit of insanity, had burned the railway stocks he owned, which would have supported the family financially. Schiele's elder sister, Melanie, became the family's sole breadwinner when she was hired as a ticket clerk at the local railway station.

Schiele and his younger sister, Gerti, became wards of his uncle-in-law (by marriage to Schiele's paternal aunt, Maria), Leopold Czihaczek, also a railway official. Although he wanted Schiele to follow in his footsteps and was distressed at his lack of interest in academia, he recognised Schiele's talent for drawing and allowed him a tutor, the artist Ludwig Karl Strauch. Eventually, the uncle renounced his guardianship of Schiele, and Schiele became dependent on financial support from his mother to continue his art studies. This support was cut off due to his sister Melanie's objecting to the expense of it, and it caused a rift in the family.

In 1906, Schiele applied to the Kunstgewerbeschule (School of Arts and Crafts) in Vienna, where Gustav Klimt had once studied. During his studies at the school, he explored sculpture and created a number of small-scale clay and plaster sculptures. Within his first year there, Schiele was sent, at the insistence of several faculty members, to the more traditional Academy of Fine Arts Vienna (Akademie der Bildenden Künste) in Vienna in 1906. His main teacher at the academy was Christian Griepenkerl, a painter whose strict doctrine and ultra-conservative style frustrated and dissatisfied Schiele so much that he left after three years.

=== Klimt and first exhibitions ===
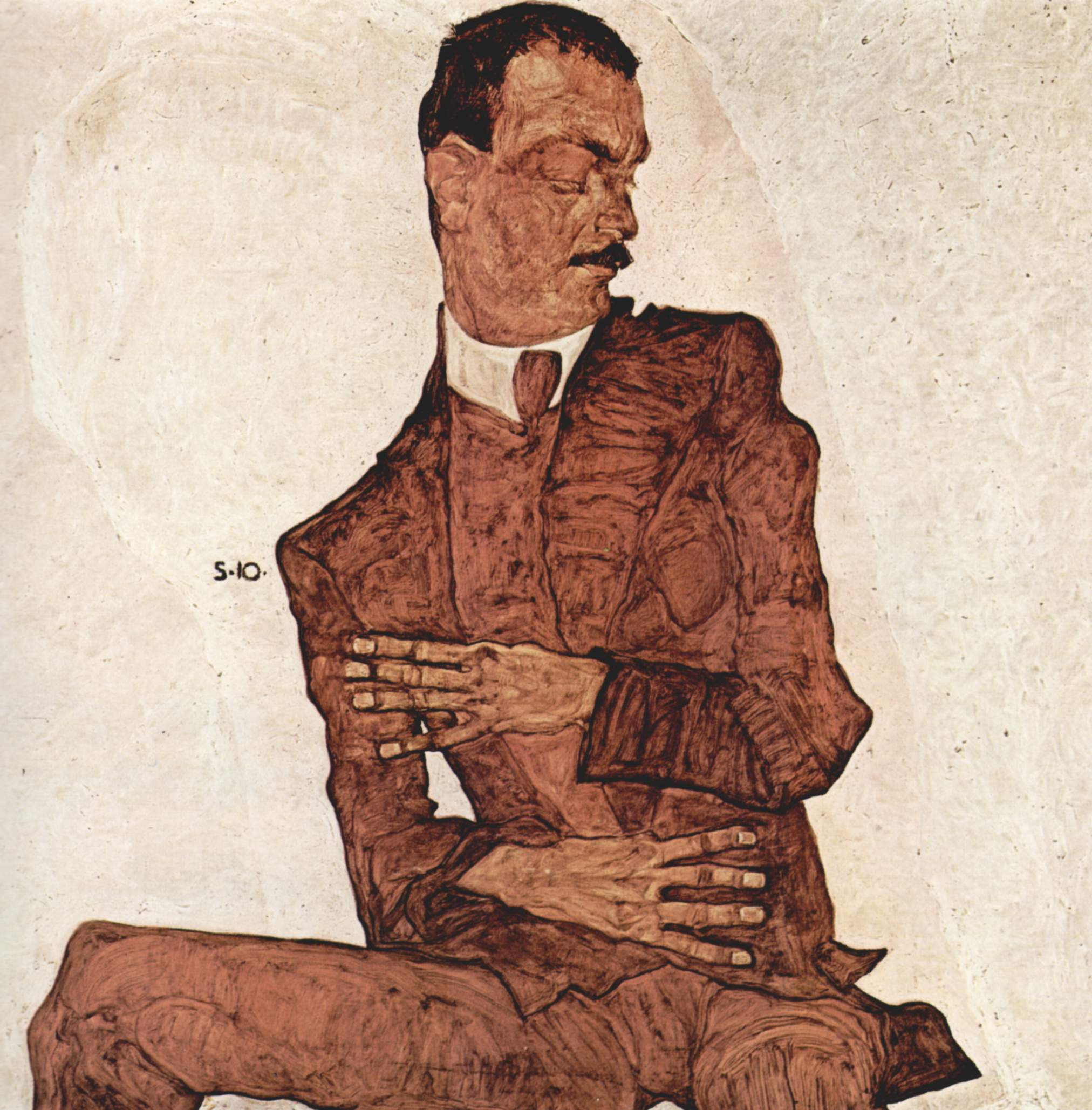
Portrait of Arthur Rössler, 1910

In 1907, Schiele sought out Gustav Klimt, who generously mentored younger artists. Klimt took a particular interest in the young Schiele, buying his drawings, offering to exchange them for some of his own, arranging models for him, and introducing him to potential patrons. He also introduced Schiele to the Wiener Werkstätte, the arts and crafts workshop connected with the Vienna Secession. Schiele's earliest works between 1907 and 1909 contain strong similarities with those of Klimt, as well as influences from Art Nouveau. In 1908, Schiele had his first exhibition, in Klosterneuburg. Schiele left the academy in 1909, after completing his third year, and founded the Neukunstgruppe ("New Art Group") with other dissatisfied students. In his early years, Schiele was strongly influenced by Klimt and Oskar Kokoschka. Although imitations of their styles, particularly with the former, are noticeably visible in Schiele's first works, he soon evolved his own distinctive style.

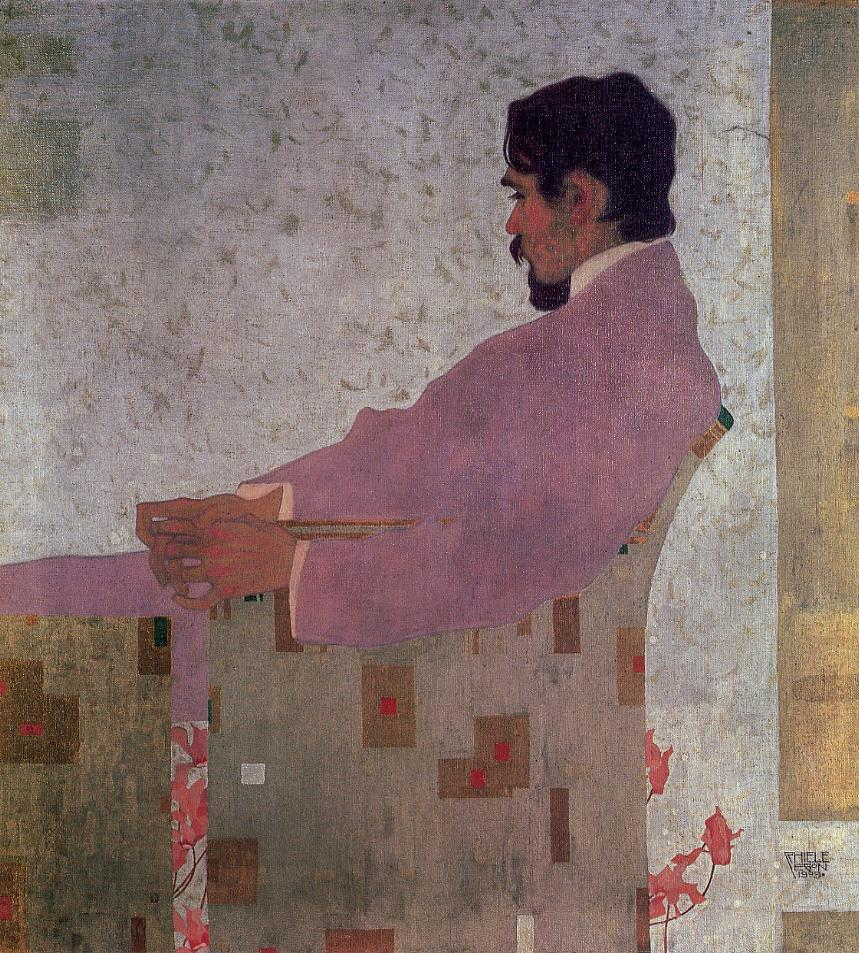
Portrait of Anton Peschka, 1909

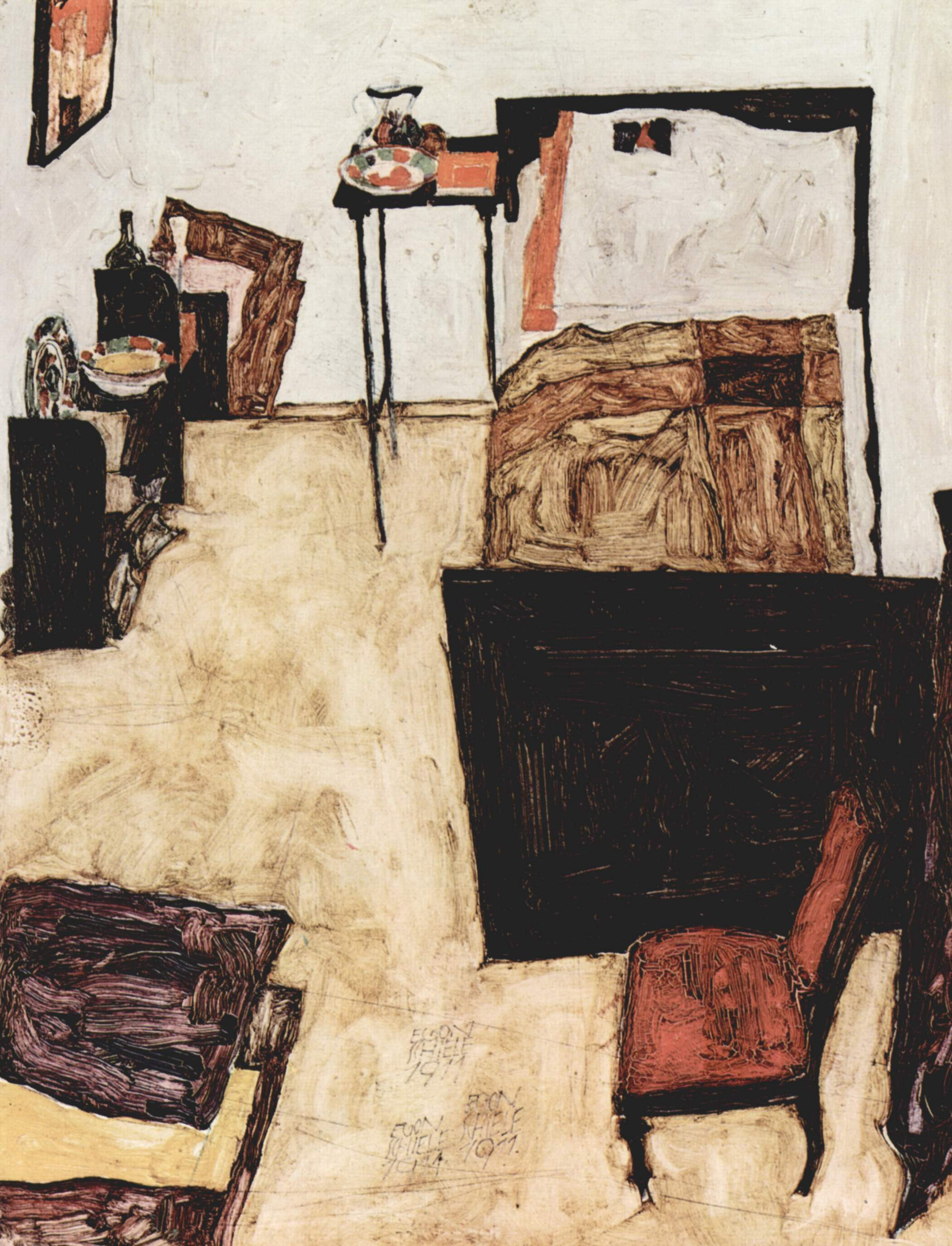
Bedroom in Neulengbach, 1911

Klimt invited Schiele to exhibit some of his work at the 1909 Vienna Kunstschau, where he encountered the work of Edvard Munch, Jan Toorop, and Vincent van Gogh among others. Once free of the academy's constraints, Schiele began to explore not only the human form, but also sexuality. Schiele's work was already daring, but it went a bold step further with the inclusion of Klimt's decorative eroticism and figurative distortions. He also painted tributes to Van Gogh's Sunflowers as well as landscapes and still lifes.

In 1910, Schiele began experimenting with nudes, and within a year, a definitive style featuring emaciated, sickly-coloured figures, often with strong sexual overtones, began to emerge. Schiele also began painting and drawing children.

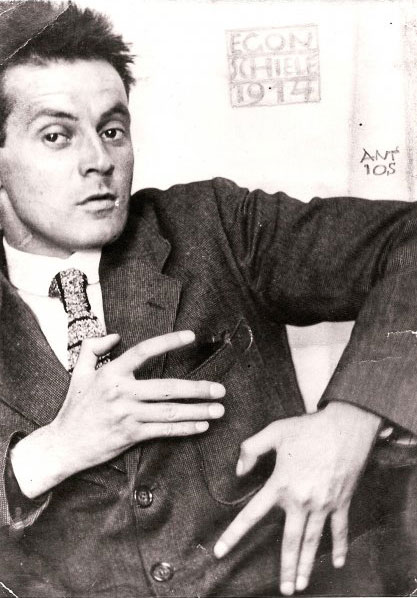
Egon Schiele photographed by Anton Josef Trčka, 1914

Schiele began to participate in what would be numerous group exhibitions, including those of the Neukunstgruppe in Prague in 1910 and Budapest in 1912; the Sonderbund, Cologne, in 1912; and several Secessionist shows in Munich, beginning in 1911. In 1911, at the age of twenty-one, Schiele met the seventeen-year-old Wally Neuzil, who lived with him in Vienna and served as a model for some of his most striking paintings. She had previously modelled for Klimt and might have been one of his mistresses. Schiele and Wally wanted to escape what they perceived as the claustrophobic Viennese milieu, and went to the small town of Krumau in southern Bohemia. Krumau was the birthplace of Schiele's mother; today it is the site of a museum dedicated to Schiele. Despite Schiele's family connections in Krumau, he and his lover were driven out of the town by the residents, who strongly disapproved of their bohemian lifestyle, including his alleged employment of the town's teenage girls as models. Progressively, Schiele's work grew more complex and thematic, and he eventually began dealing with themes such as death and rebirth.

=== Neulengbach and imprisonment ===
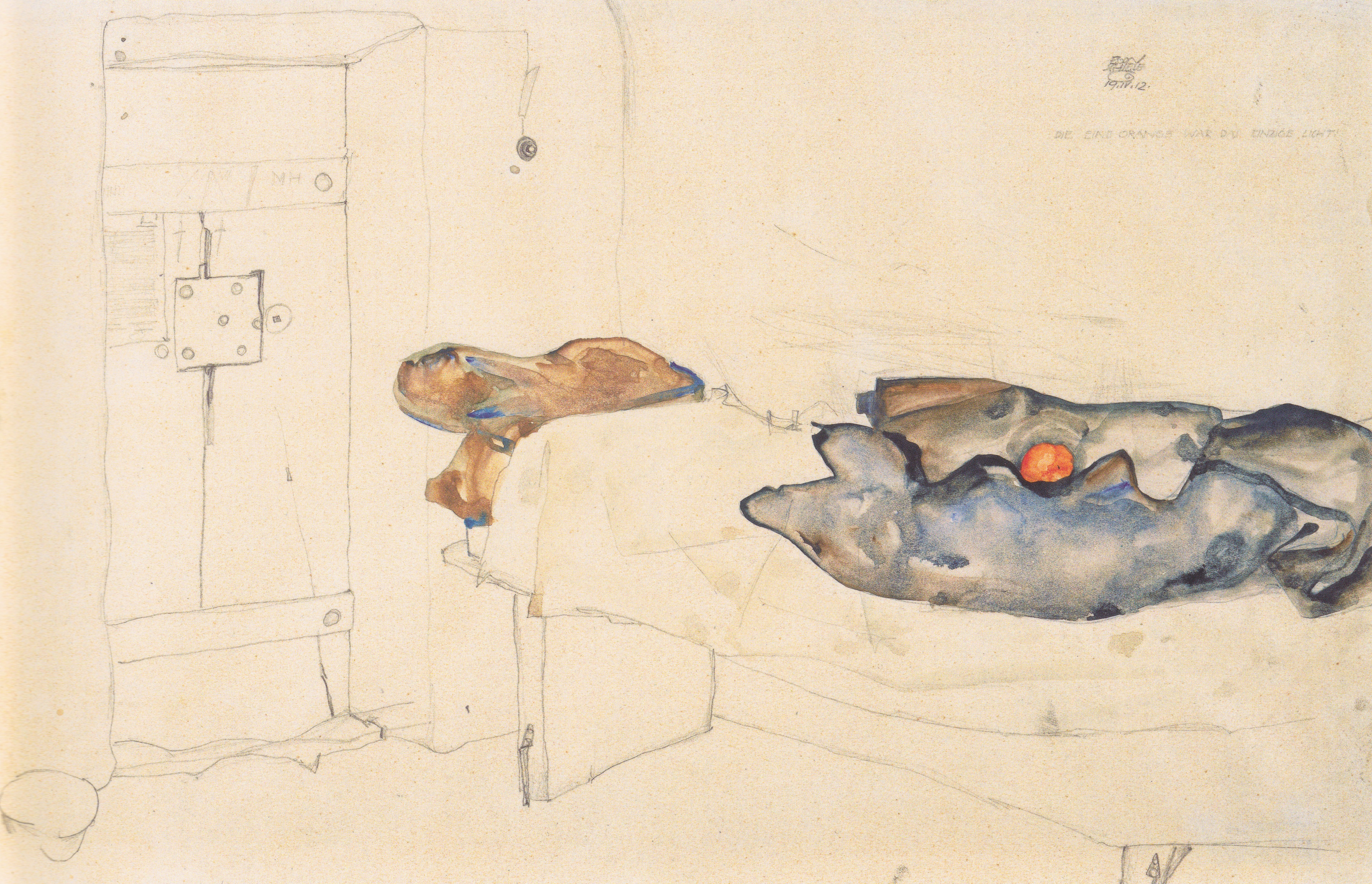
Schiele's drawing of his prison cell in Neulengbach

Together, the couple moved to Neulengbach, 35 km (22 mi) west of Vienna, seeking inspirational surroundings and an inexpensive studio in which to work. As had been the case in the capital, young people and teenagers gathered in Schiele's new studio in Neulengbach. Schiele's way of life aroused much animosity among the town's inhabitants, and in April 1912 he was arrested under suspicion of kidnapping and seducing a girl of 13.

When the police came to his studio to place Schiele under arrest, they seized more than a hundred drawings which they considered pornographic. Schiele was imprisoned while awaiting his trial. When his case was brought before a judge, the charges were dropped, but the artist was found guilty of exhibiting erotic drawings in a place accessible to children. In court, the judge burned one of the drawings ("depicting a very young girl dressed only above the waist") over a candle flame. The 21 days he had already spent in custody were taken into account, and he was sentenced to a further three days' imprisonment. While in prison, Schiele created a series of paintings depicting his jail cell.

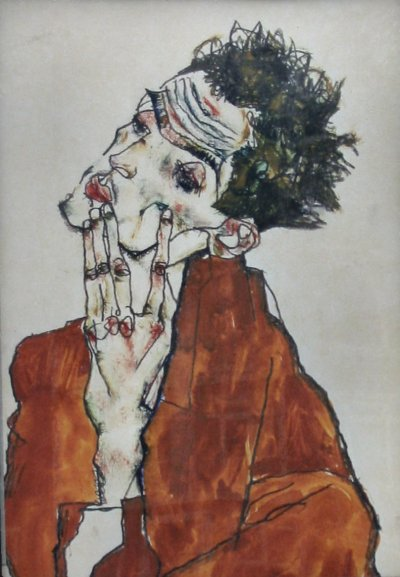
Self portrait, c.1910

In 1913, the Galerie Hans Goltz, Munich, mounted Schiele's first solo show. A solo exhibition of his work took place in Paris in 1914.

=== World War I ===
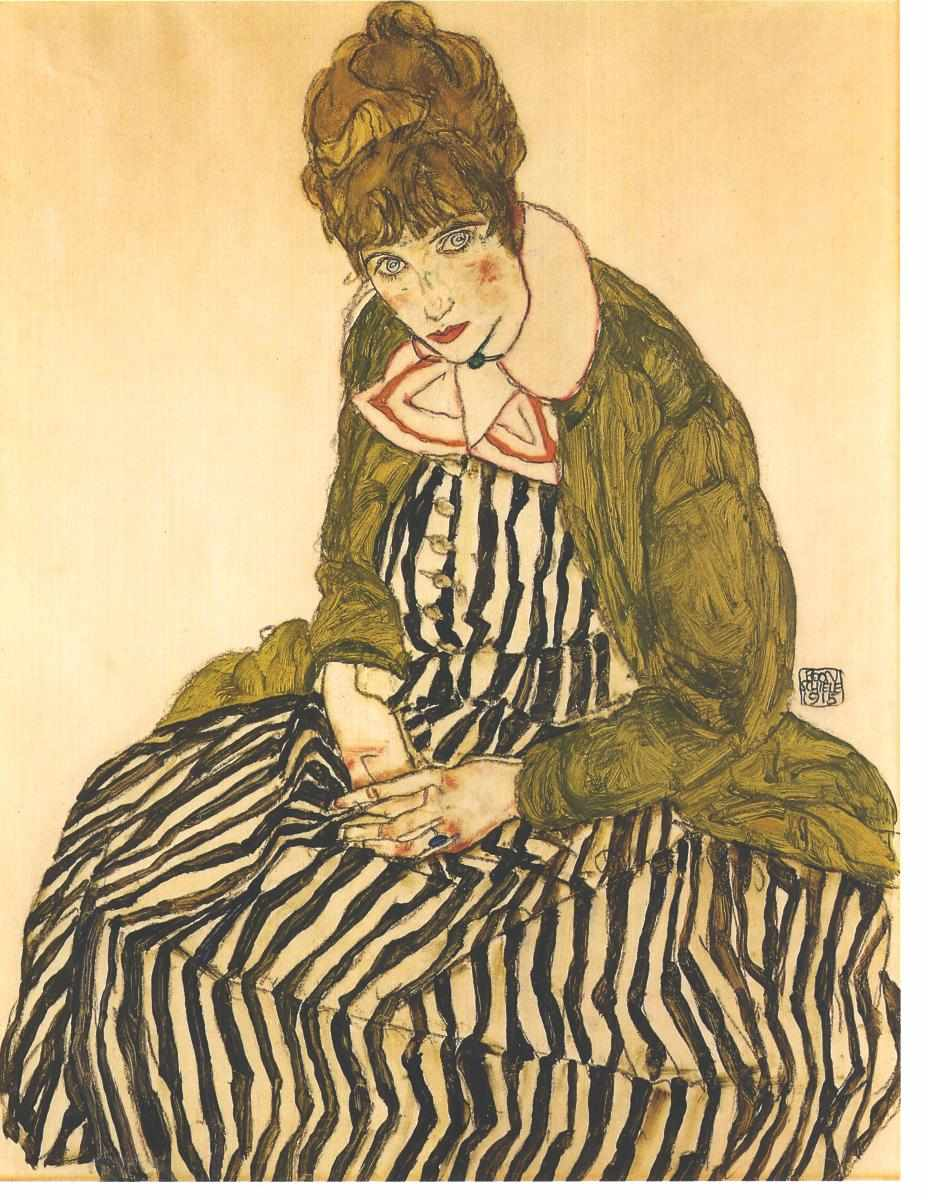
Edith Schiele in a Striped Dress, Seated, 1915

In 1914, Schiele glimpsed the sisters Edith and Adéle Harms, who lived with their parents across the street from his studio in the Viennese district of Hietzing, 101 Hietzinger Hauptstraße. They were a middle-class family and Protestant by faith; their father was a master locksmith. In 1915, Schiele chose to marry the more socially acceptable Edith, but had apparently expected to continue his relationship with Wally. When he explained the situation to Wally, she left him immediately and never saw him again. This abandonment led him to paint Death and the Maiden, where Wally's portrait is based on a previous painting, but Schiele's is newly struck. In February 1915, Schiele wrote a note to his friend Arthur Roessler stating: "I intend to get married, advantageously. Not to Wally." Despite some opposition from the Harms family, Schiele and Edith were married on 17 June 1915, the anniversary of the wedding of Schiele's parents.

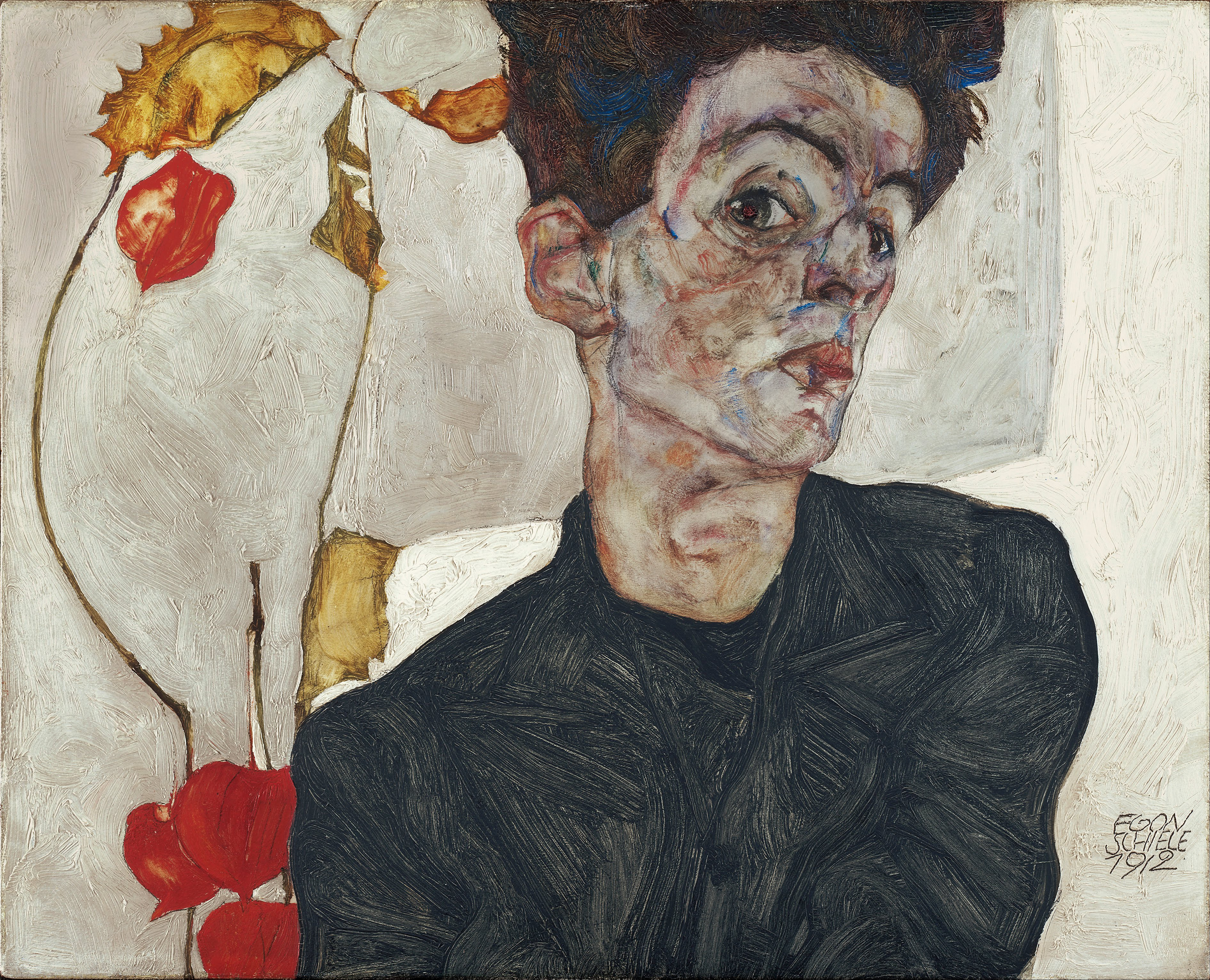
Self-Portrait with Physalis, 1915

Although Schiele avoided conscription for almost a year, World War I now began to shape his life and work. Three days after his wedding, Schiele was ordered to report for active service in the army, where he was initially stationed in Prague. Edith came with him and stayed in a hotel in the city, while Egon lived in an exhibition hall with his fellow conscripts. They were allowed by Schiele's commanding officer to see each other occasionally.

During the war, Schiele's paintings became larger and more detailed. His military service gave him limited time, and much of his output consisted of linear drawings of scenery and military officers. Around this time, Schiele also began experimenting with the themes of motherhood and family. His wife Edith was the model for most of his female figures, but during the war (due to circumstance) many of his sitters were male. From 1915, Schiele's female nudes became fuller in figure, and many were deliberately illustrated with a lifeless doll-like appearance.

Despite his military service, Schiele was still exhibiting in Berlin. He also had successful shows in Zürich, Prague, and Dresden. His first duties consisted of guarding and escorting Russian prisoners. Because of his weak heart and his excellent handwriting, Schiele was eventually given a job as a clerk in a POW camp near the town of Mühlingen. There, he was allowed to draw and paint imprisoned Russian officers; his commander, Karl Moser (who assumed that Schiele was a painter and decorator when he first met him), even gave him a disused store room to use as a studio. Since Schiele was in charge of the food stores in the camp, he and Edith could enjoy food beyond rations.

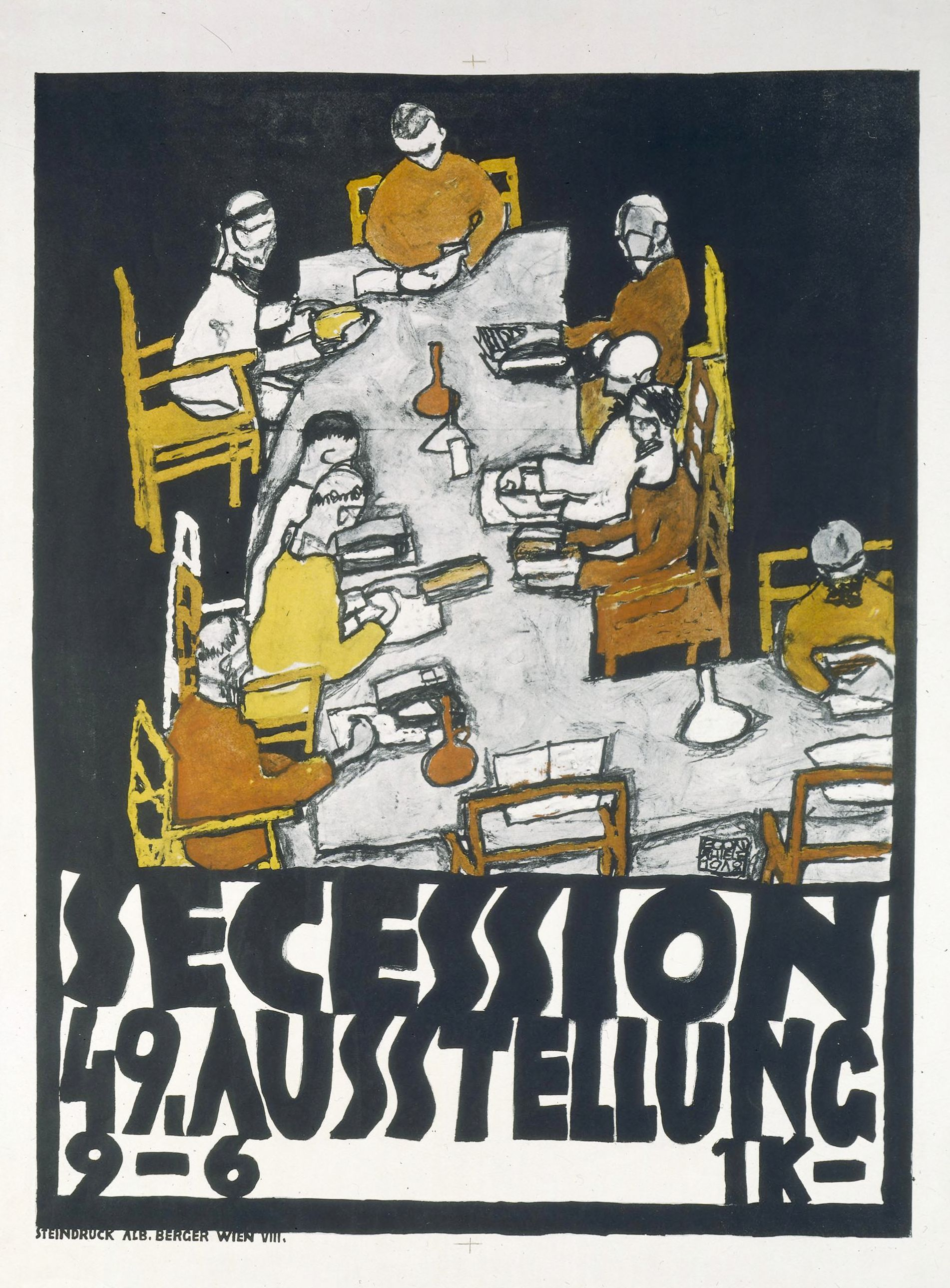
1918 poster Vienna Secession

Schiele did everything he could to get out of military service. In January 1917, he was transferred to a military supply depot in Vienna and given no particular responsibilities. He was again able to focus on his artistic career, and his output was prolific. His work reflected the maturity of an artist in full command of his talents. Schiele was invited to participate in the 49th Vienna Secession exhibition held in 1918. Schiele had fifty works accepted for this exhibition, and they were displayed in the main hall. He also designed a poster for the exhibition. The composition was reminiscent of the Last Supper, with a portrait of himself in the place of Jesus. The show was a triumphant success. As a result, prices for Schiele's drawings increased, and he received many portrait commissions.

=== Death ===
In the autumn of 1918, the Spanish flu pandemic reached Vienna. Edith, who was six months pregnant, died from the disease on 28 October. Schiele, very sick and weak, was transferred from the couple's home to his in-laws' house. Due to fear of contagion, visitors would communicate with Schiele from afar by way of a mirror which was set up on the threshold of his room and the parlour. Among Schiele's last visitors were his mother Marie and sister Melanie.

Schiele died three days after his wife. He was 28 years old. During the three days between their deaths, Schiele drew a few sketches of Edith.

== Style ==
Jane Kallir has described Schiele's work as grotesque, erotic, pornographic, or disturbing, with a focus on sex, death, and discovery. He focused on portraits of others as well as himself. In his later years, while he still worked often with nudes, they were done in a more realist fashion. From a young age, Schiele drew with "manic fluency".

Art critic Martin Gayford wrote in The Spectator:

He [Schiele] found his distinctive style very early. His entire oeuvre is that of a young man; most of the work in the first of the two rooms of this densely packed little exhibition dates from 1910 to 1911, when Schiele (1890–1918) was just 20. That helps to explain some tendencies: a half-disgusted preoccupation with sexuality and a similarly queasy fascination with examining his naked self. The male figures mainly seem to have been modelled by the artist, though it is hard to be certain since the head is often not included.

Kallir and scholar Gerald Izenberg regard Schiele as fluid in sexuality and gender. Kallir says Schiele was "struggling with his own sexual feelings and gender norms" during a historical period of shifting gender expectations, the early women's movement, and criminalisation of homosexuality. Some critics in the 21st century read his artwork as queer.

== Legacy ==
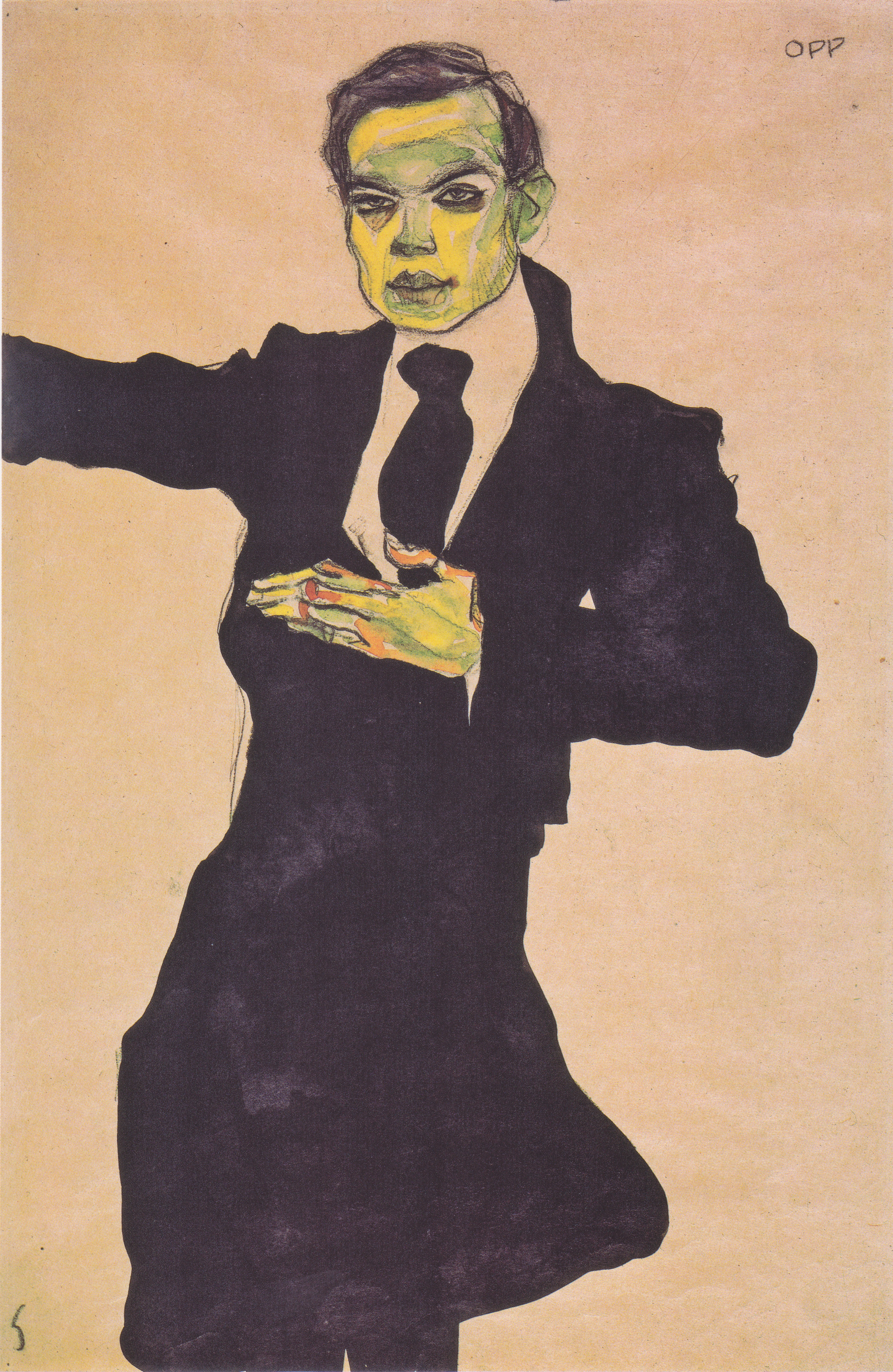
Max Oppenheimer, 1910

Schiele was the subject of the 1980 biographical film Excess and Punishment (Egon Schiele – Exzess und Bestrafung), originating in Germany with a European cast that explores Schiele's artistic demons leading up to his early death. The film was directed by Herbert Vesely and stars Mathieu Carrière as Schiele, Jane Birkin as his early artistic muse Wally Neuzil, Christine Kaufman as his wife, Edith Harms, and Kristina Van Eyck as her sister, Adele Harms. Also in 1980, the Arts Council of Great Britain produced a documentary film, Schiele in Prison, which looked at the circumstances of Schiele's imprisonment and the veracity of his diary. In 2016, another biographical film was released: Egon Schiele: Death and the Maiden (Egon Schiele: Tod und Mädchen).

Joanna Scott's 1990 novel Arrogance was based on Schiele's life and makes him the main figure. His life was also depicted in a theatrical dance production by Stephan Mazurek called Egon Schiele, presented in May 1995, for which Rachel's, an American post-rock group, composed a score titled Music for Egon Schiele. For The Featherstonehaughs contemporary dance company, Lea Anderson choreographed The Featherstonehaughs Draw On The Sketchbooks Of Egon Schiele in 1997. Glen Hansard, lead singer of Irish band The Frames, said (of writing the song Santa Maria): "...With Santa Maria, I was trying to write a song about Egon Schiele, and about him and his girlfriend, while they were both dying from Spanish flu...".

The novel The Flames (Doubleday, 2022), written by British author Sophie Haydock, blends fact and fiction to tell a story of Schiele's four most significant muses. The book was named one of the best historical fiction novels of 2022 by The Times. The Italian translation, Le Fiamme (Salani, 2023), won the Premio Letterario Edoardo Kihlgren award for a debut novel in 2024.

Schiele's life and work have also been the subject of essays, including a discussion of his works by fashion photographer Richard Avedon in an essay on portraiture entitled "Borrowed Dogs." Mario Vargas Llosa uses the work of Schiele as a conduit to seduce and morally exploit a main character in his 1997 novel The Notebooks of Don Rigoberto. Wes Anderson's film The Grand Budapest Hotel features a painting by Rich Pellegrino that is modeled after Schiele's style which, as part of a theft, replaces a so-called Flemish/Renaissance masterpiece, but is then destroyed by the angry owner when he discovers the deception. The cover of David Bowie's 1979 Lodger album is inspired by Schiele's self-portraits, and an image of Schiele appears on the cover of the 2013 single "The Stars (Are Out Tonight)". In 1978, director Clive Donner cast Bowie and Charlotte Rampling in a film to be called Wally, centred around Schiele and his relationship with his lover Wally Neuzil; however, due to insufficient funding, the project never materialised.

Julia Jordan based her 1999 play Tatjana in Color, which was produced off-Broadway at The Culture Project during the fall of 2003, on a fictionalisation of the relationship between Schiele and the 12-year-old Tatjana von Mossig, the Neulengbach girl whose morals he was ultimately convicted of corrupting for allowing her to see his paintings. The opening chapters of Guy Mankowski's 2017 novel An Honest Deceit were cited to be heavily influenced by Schiele's paintings; in particular his portrayals of his sister, Gertrude.

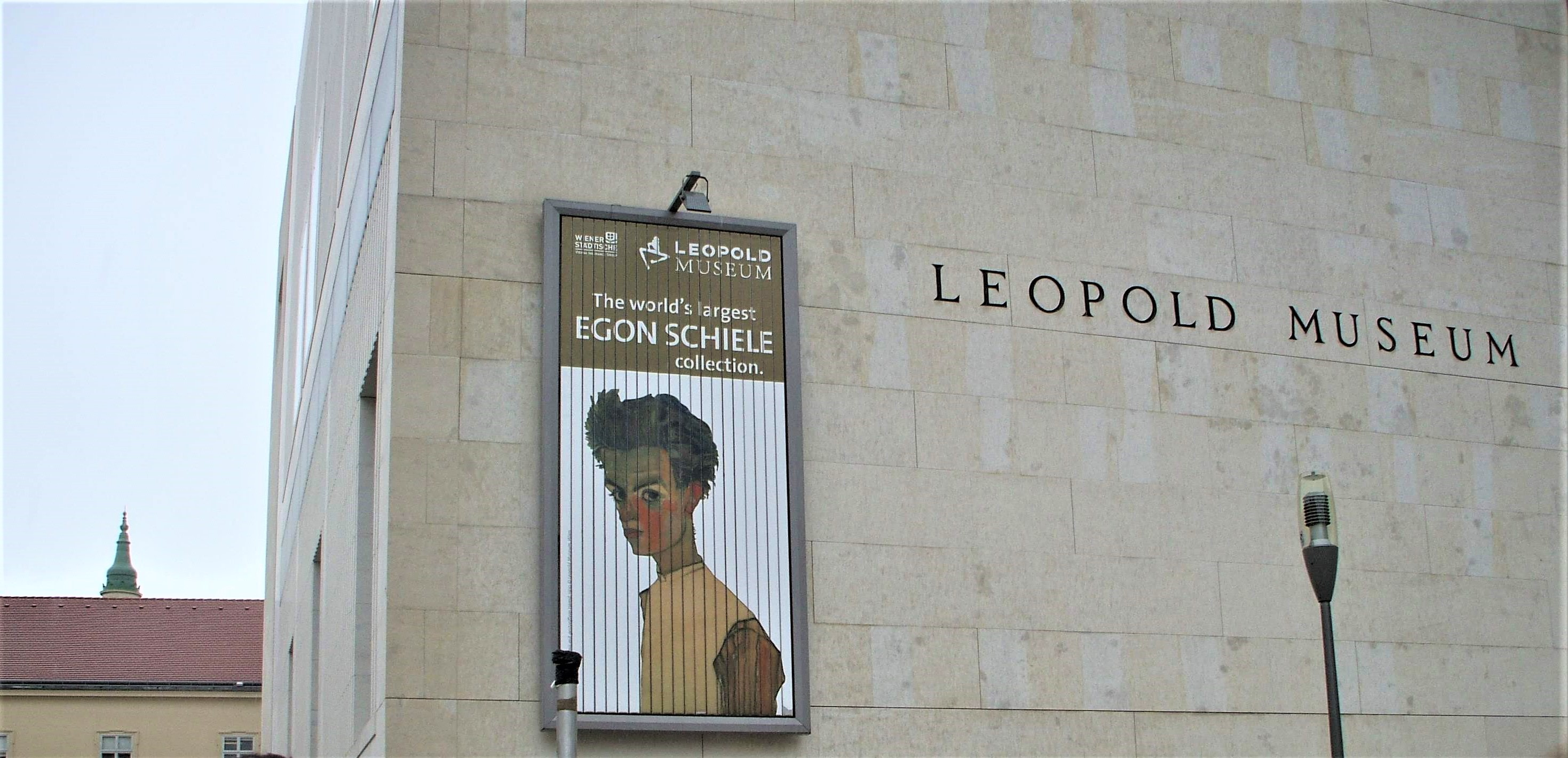
Leopold Museum in 2008

=== Art collections ===
The Leopold Museum, Vienna, houses perhaps Schiele's most important and complete collection of work, featuring over 200 works. The museum sold one of these, Houses With Colorful Laundry (Suburb II), for $40.1 million at Sotheby's in 2011. Other notable collections of Schiele's art include the Egon Schiele-Museum, Tulln, the Österreichische Galerie Belvedere, and the Albertina Graphic Collection, both in Vienna. Viktor Fogarassy collected works by Schiele, including Dämmernde Stadt.

== Nazi-looted art ==
Egon Schiele had among his admirers many Jewish art collectors whose collections were looted under the Nazis: in Germany from 1933, in Austria from the Anschluss of 1938, and in France from the German occupation of 1940. As a result, numerous restitution cases in the 21st century involve artworks by Schiele. Egon Schiele's Dead City, "Woman in Black Pinafore" (1911) and "Woman Hiding Her Face" (1912) were owned by Jewish cabaret artist and film star Fritz Grünbaum before the Nazis deported him to the Dachau concentration camp. Krumau (1916) was owned by Daisy Hellmann until it was seized by Nazis in 1942. She first made a restitution claim in 1948 but her heirs were not able to recover the Schiele until 2002. Austria's Nazi looting organisation, the Vugesta, had auctioned Krumau at the Dorotheum in Vienna on 24–27 February 1942, where the Sanct Lucas gallery bought it on behalf of Wolfgang Gurlitt. In 1953, the City of Linz acquired it for the Neue Galerie in Linz. The 1917 painting by Egon Schiele, Portrait of the Artist's Wife was owned by Karl Mayländer, a Jewish businessman in Vienna who was murdered in Auschwitz. Robin Lehman, the son of Robert Lehman, bought Portrait of the Artist's Wife (1917) in 1964 from Marlborough Gallery in London. Four Trees / Autumn Allée was owned by Josef Morgenstern who was arrested and deported to Auschwitz, where he was murdered.

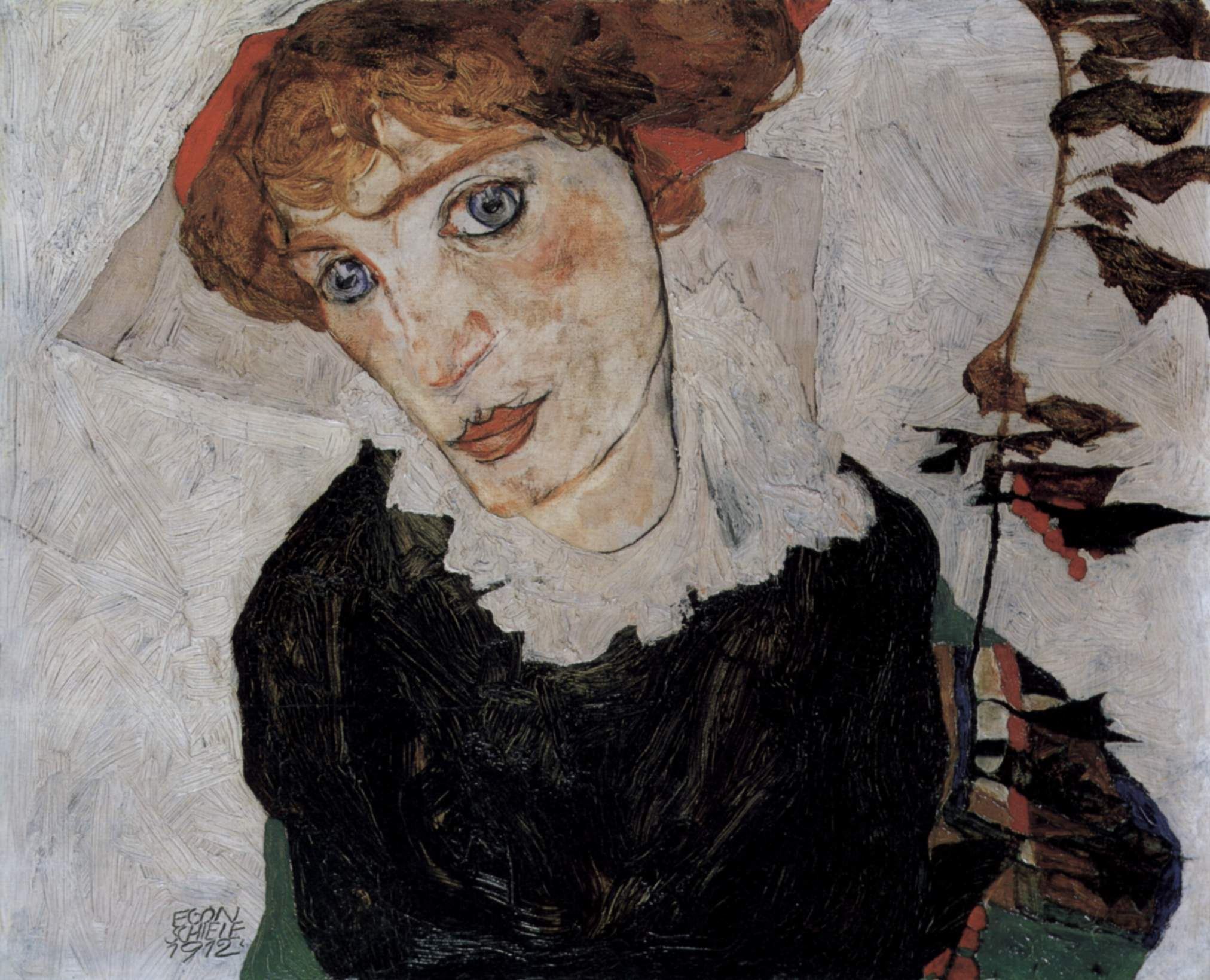
Portrait of Wally, 1912 Leopold Museum

The art gallery of the Jewish art dealer Lea Bondi Jaray, owner of the famous Portrait of Wally, was seized by the Nazis prior to his escaping to London.

Wilted Sunflowers, which had been owned by Jewish art collector Karl Grunwald and seized by Nazis in Strasbourg, was discovered after a private collector took it to Christies for evaluation in 2005. In 2006, the Expressionist work was sold at auction for 17.2 million euros. Portrait of Wally, a 1912 portrait, was purchased by Rudolf Leopold in 1954 and became part of the collection of the Leopold Museum when it was established by the Austrian government, purchasing more than 5,000 pieces that Leopold had owned. After a 1997–1998 exhibit of Schiele's work at the Museum of Modern Art in New York City, the painting was seized by order of the New York County District Attorney and had been tied up in litigation by heirs of its former owner who claim that the painting was Nazi plunder and should be returned to them.

The dispute was settled on 20 July 2010 and the picture subsequently purchased by the Leopold Museum for US$19 million. In 2013, the museum sold three drawings by Schiele for £14 million at Sotheby's London in order to settle the restitution claim over its 1914 Schiele painting Houses by the Sea. The most expensive, Liebespaar (Selbstdarstellung mit Wally) (1914/15), or Two lovers (Self Portrait With Wally), raised the world auction record for a work on paper by the artist to £7.88 million. On 21 June 2013 Auctionata in Berlin sold a watercolour from 1916, Reclining Woman, at an online auction for €1.827 million (US$2.418 million). This is a world record for the most expensive work of art ever sold at an online auction.

== Self-portraits ==
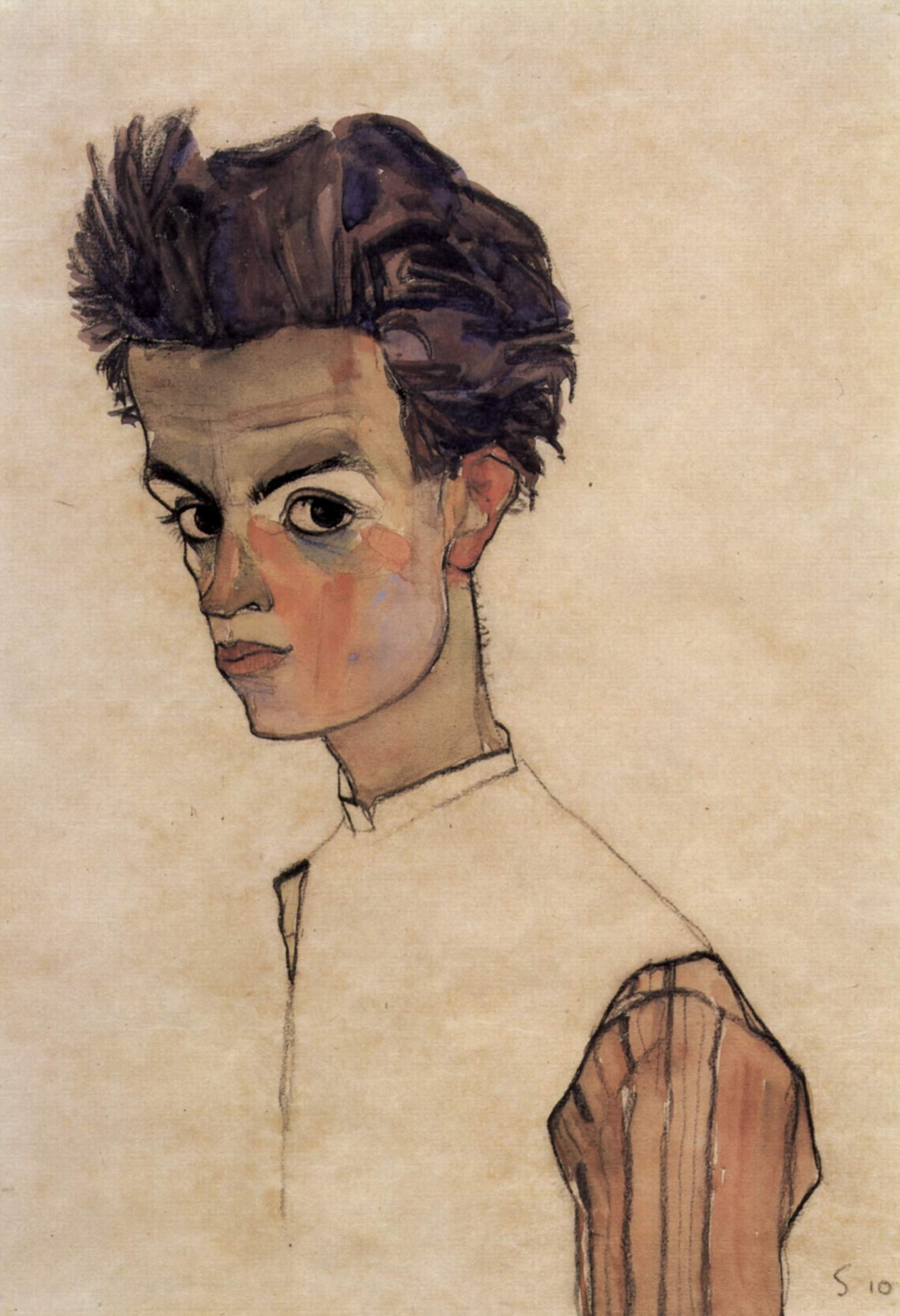
Self-portrait with striped shirt, 1910, Leopold Museum, Vienna

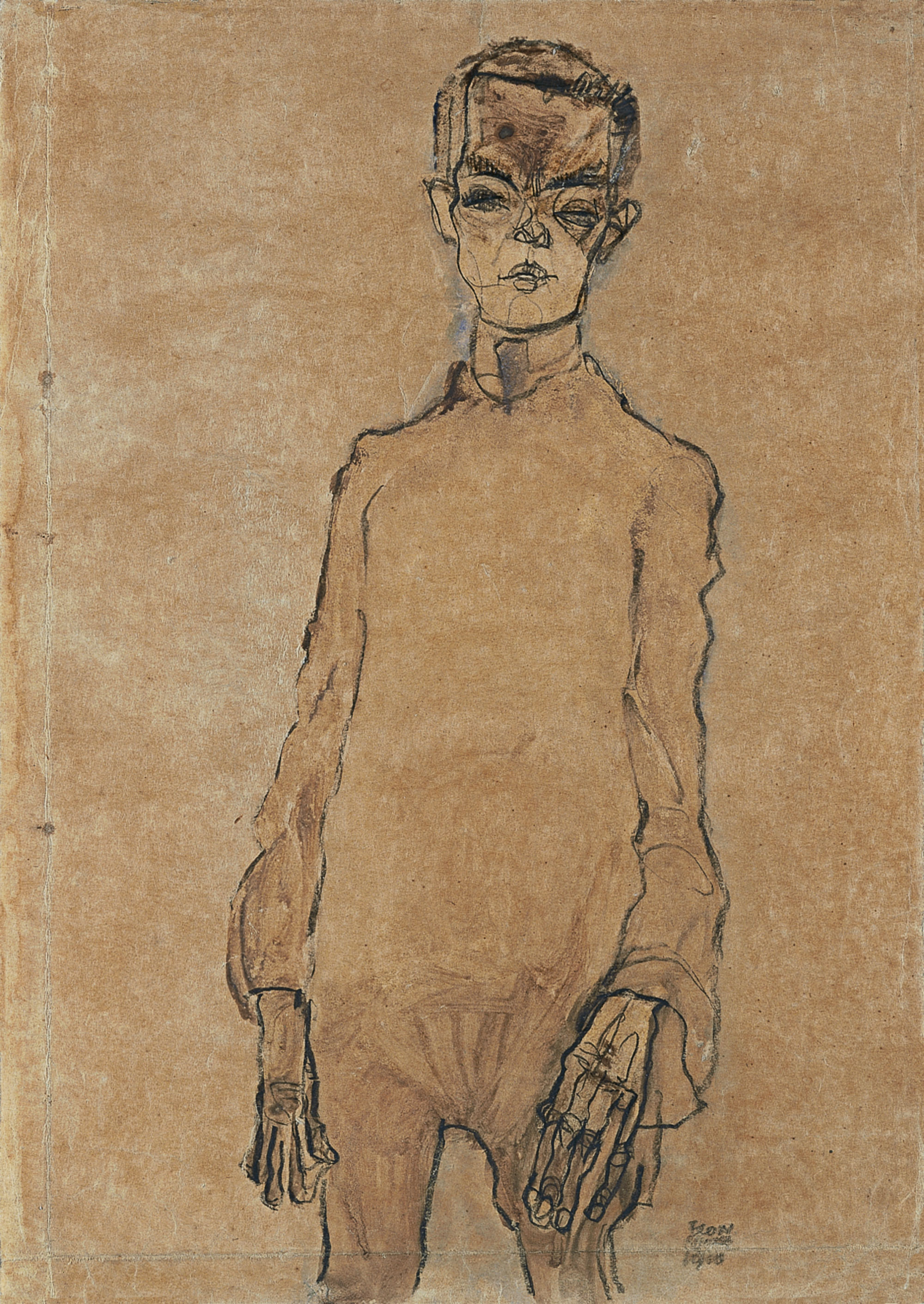
Self-portrait, 1910, Thyssen-Bornemisza Museum, Madrid

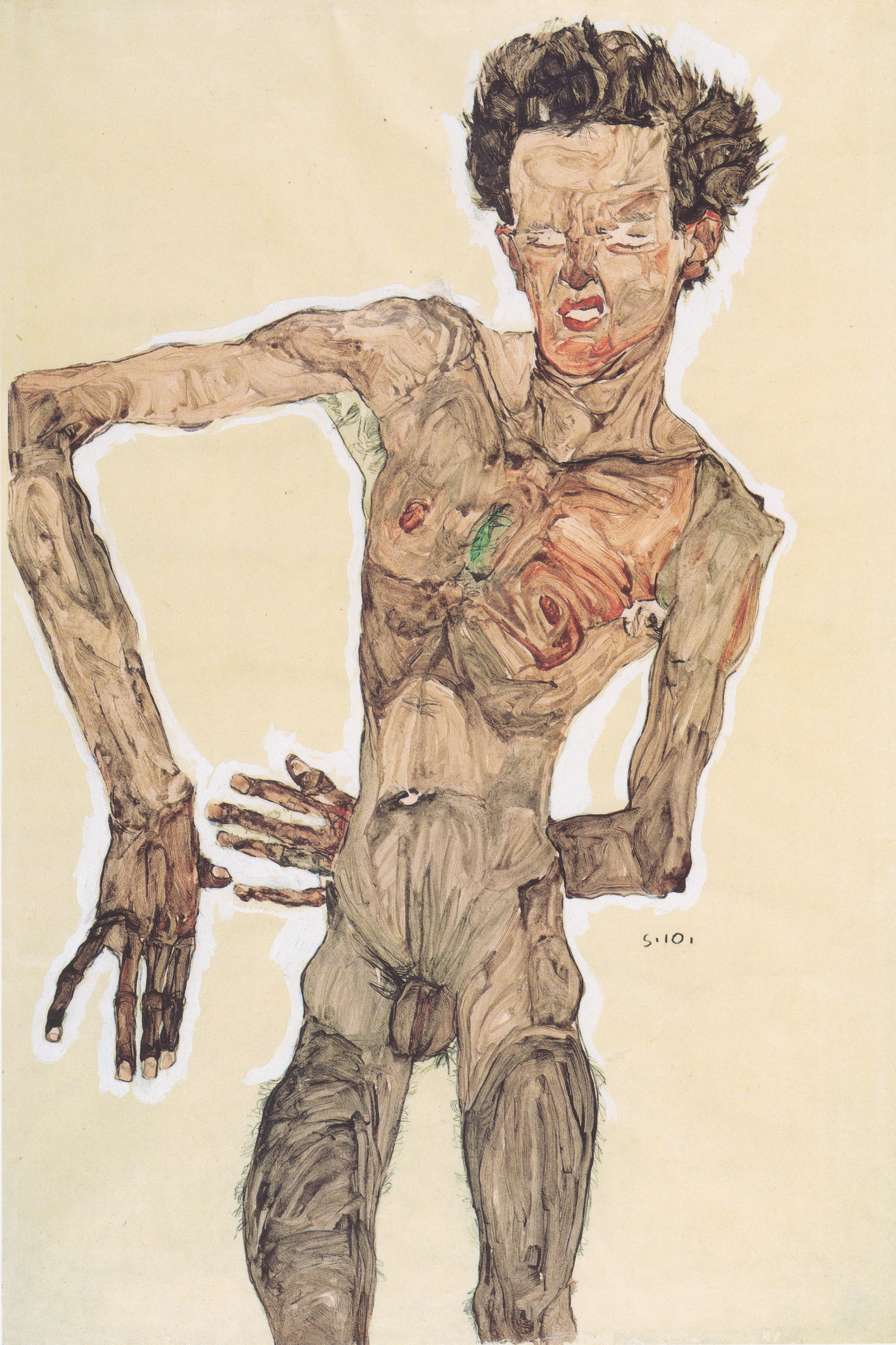
Self-portrait grimacing, 1910

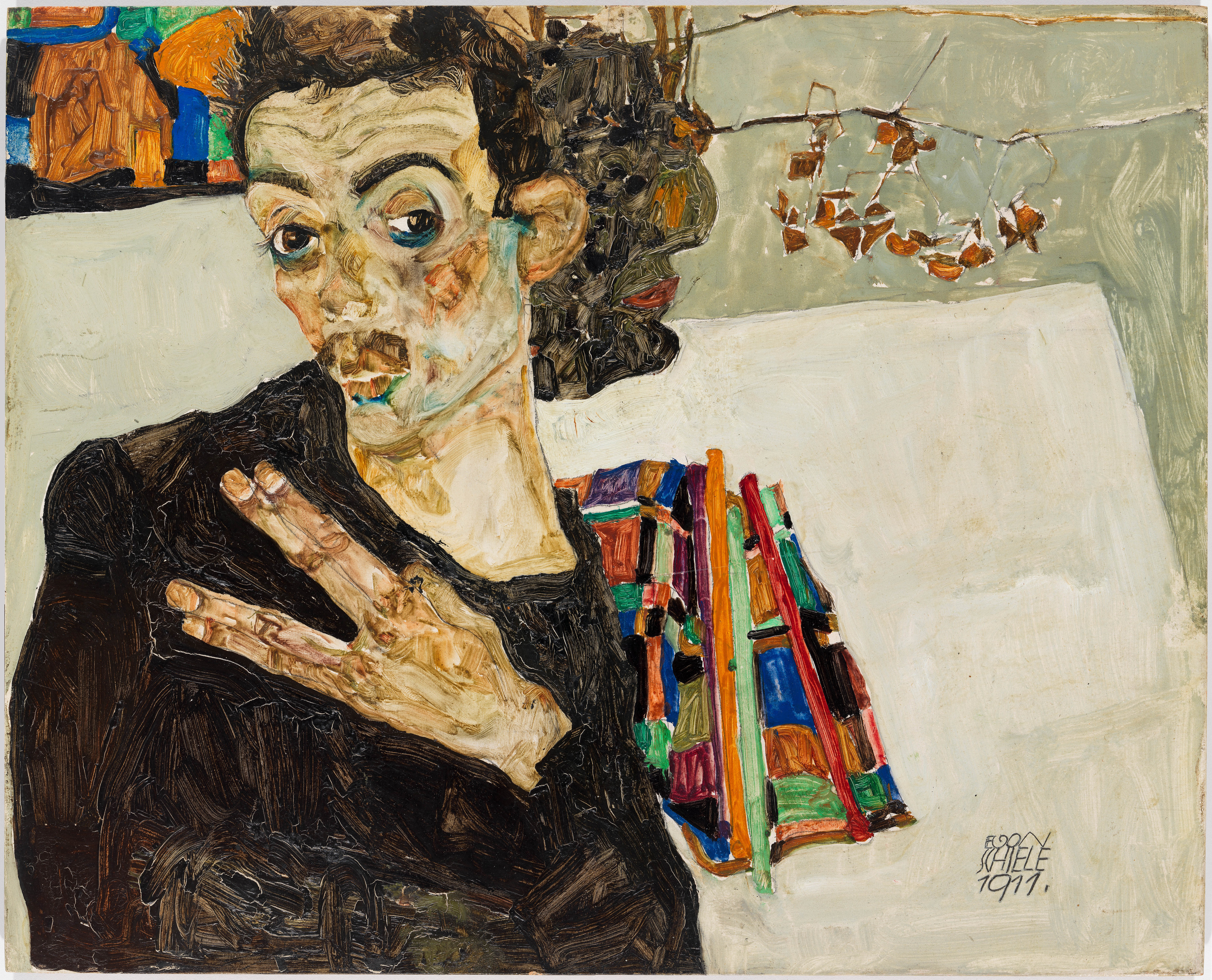
Self-portrait with black clay pot, 1911

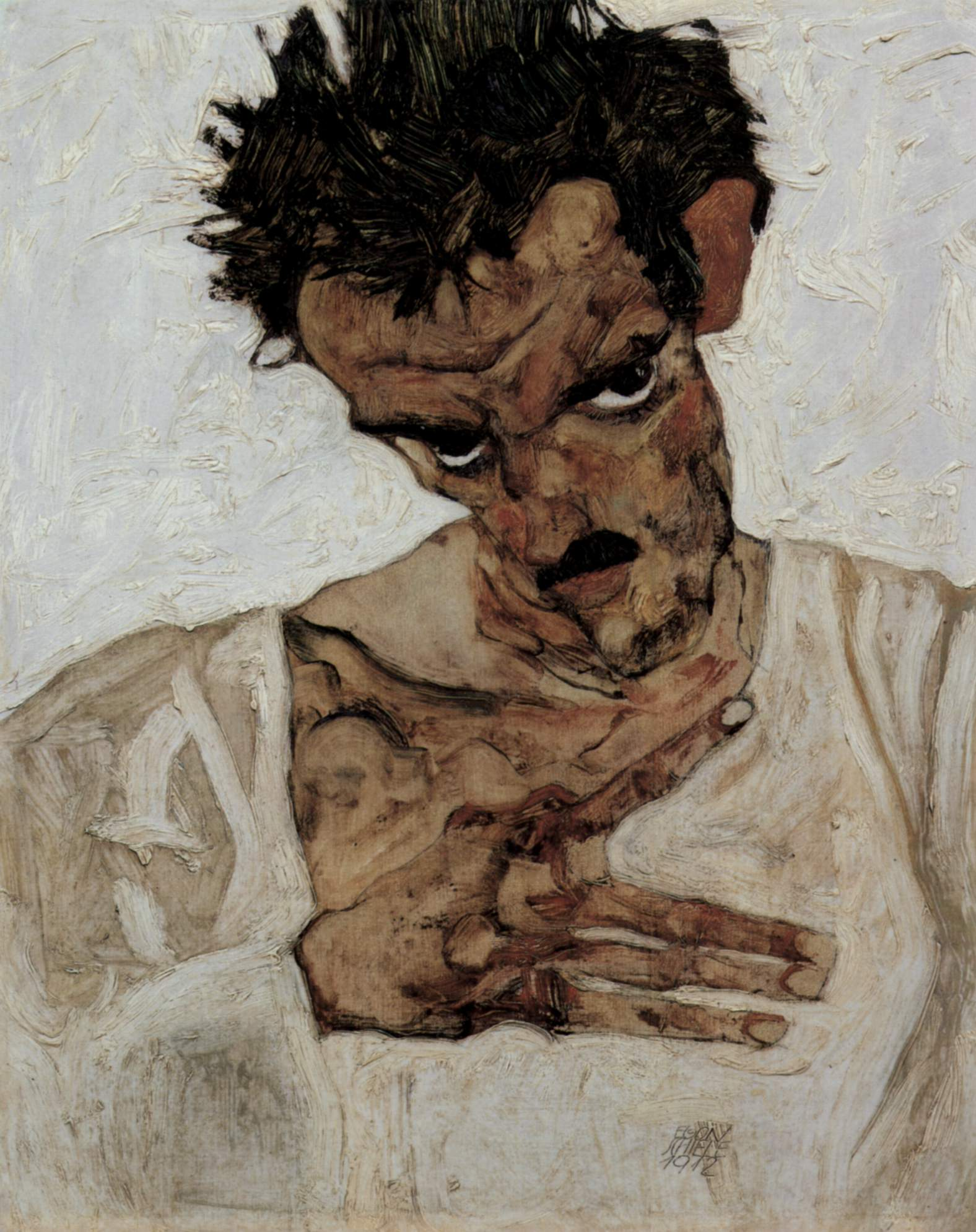
Self-portrait with lowered head, 1912 Leopold Museum, Vienna

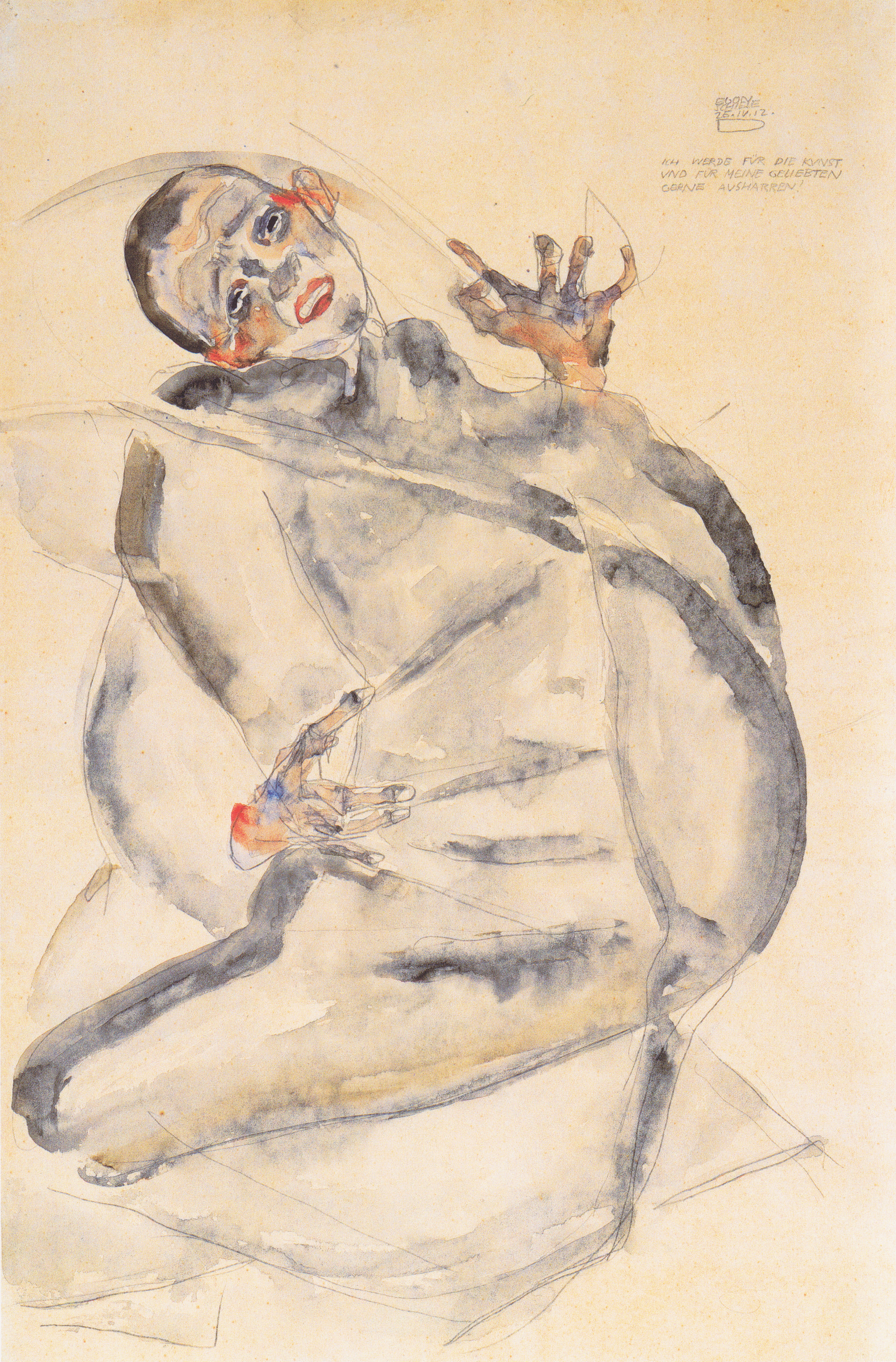
I shall endure for art and for the happiness of my lover. Self-portrait of Schiele in jail, 1912

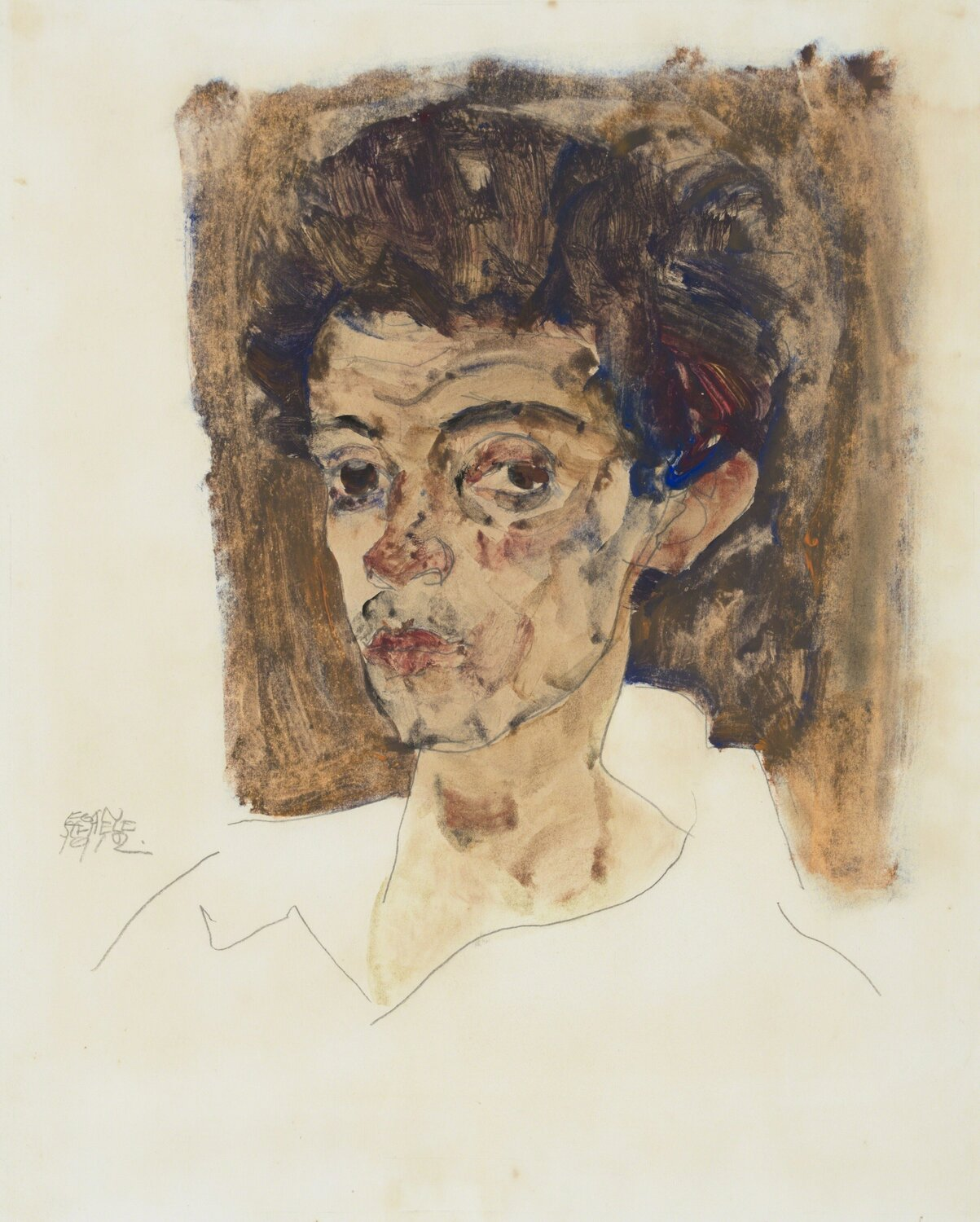
Self-Portrait with Brown Background, 1912

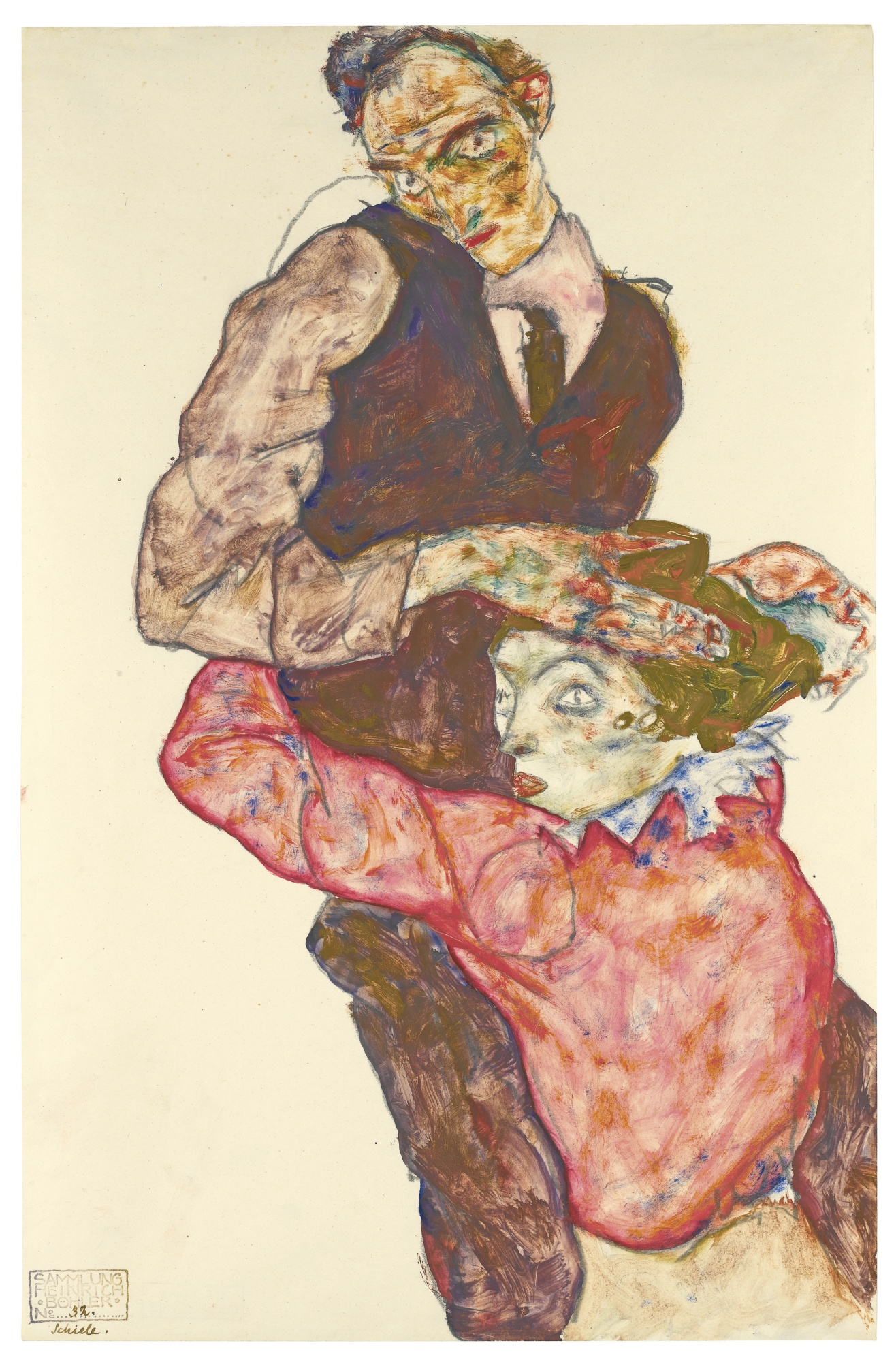
Lovers – Self-Portrait with Wally, c. 1914 – 1915

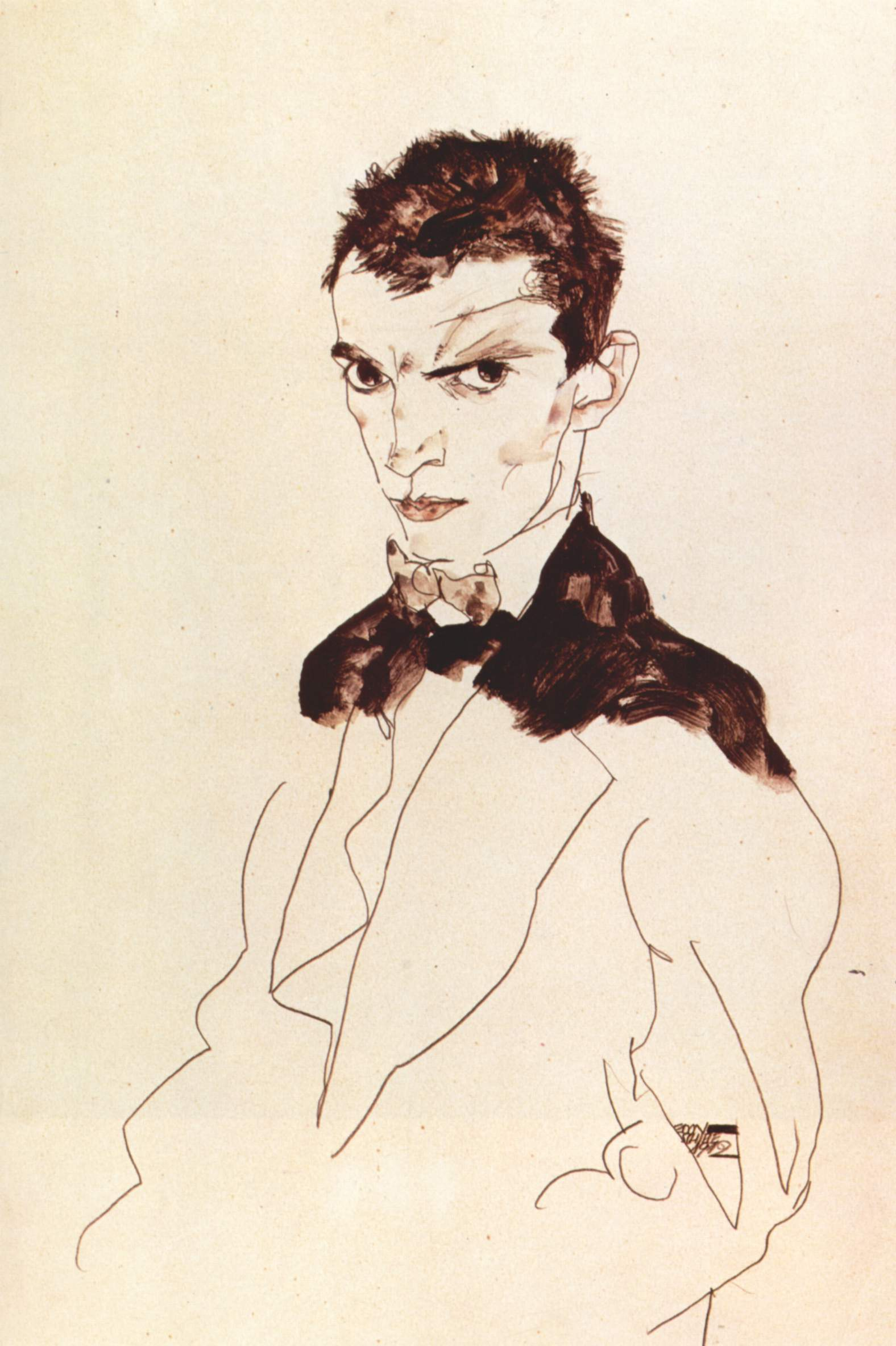
Self-portrait, 1914

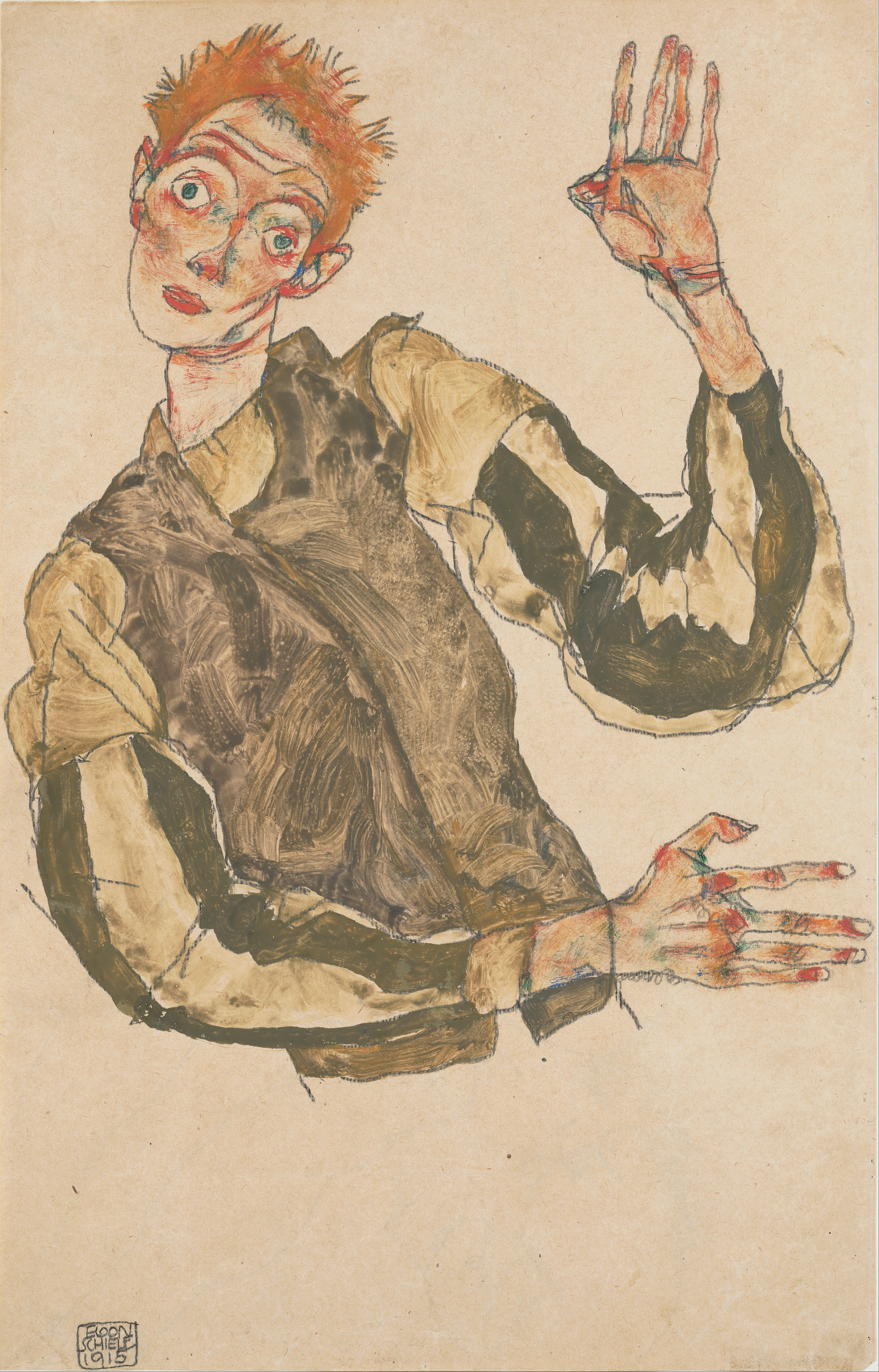
Self-portrait, 1915

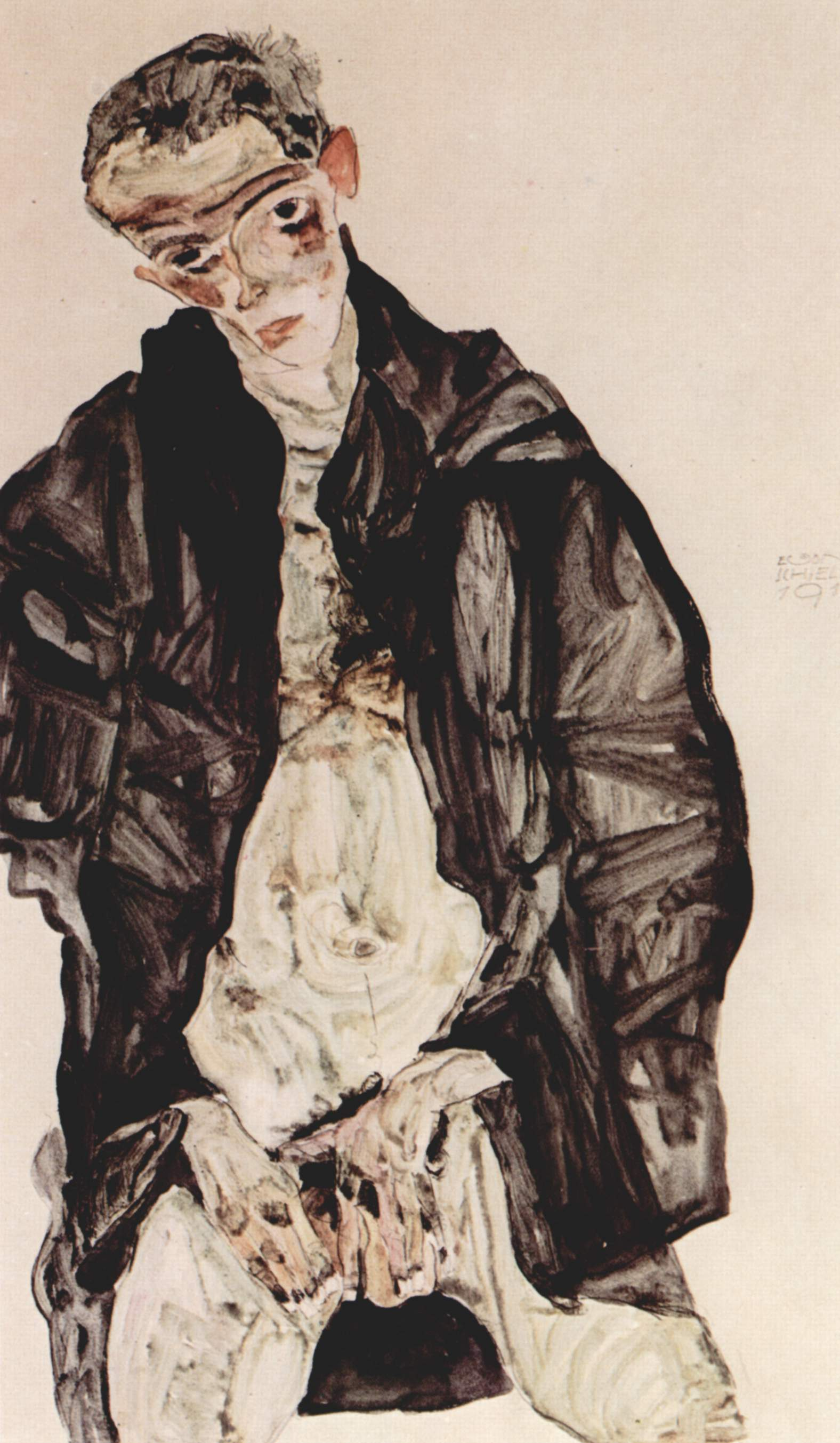
Self-portrait depicting masturbation, 1911

== Figurative works ==
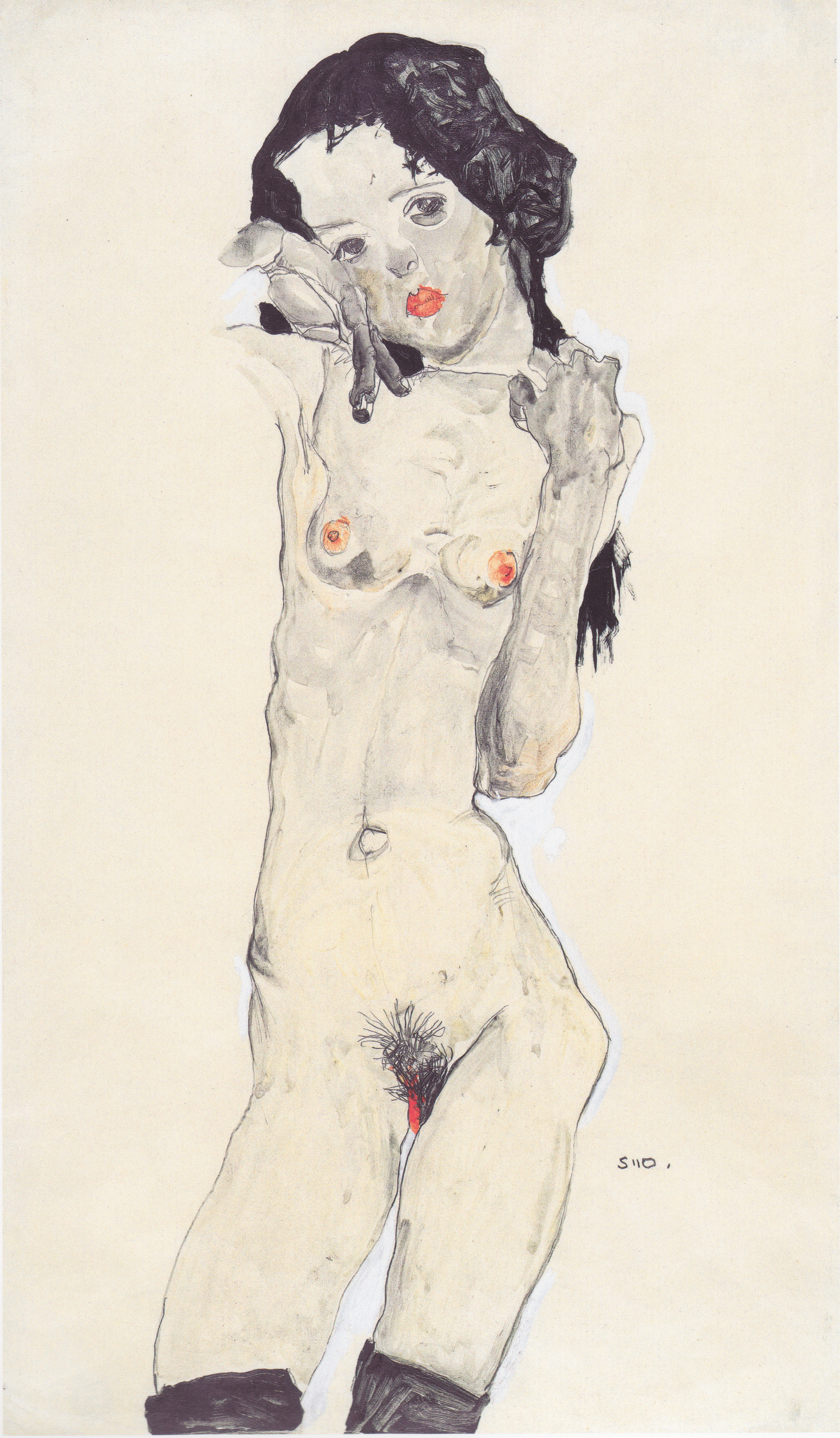
Girl with black hair, 1910

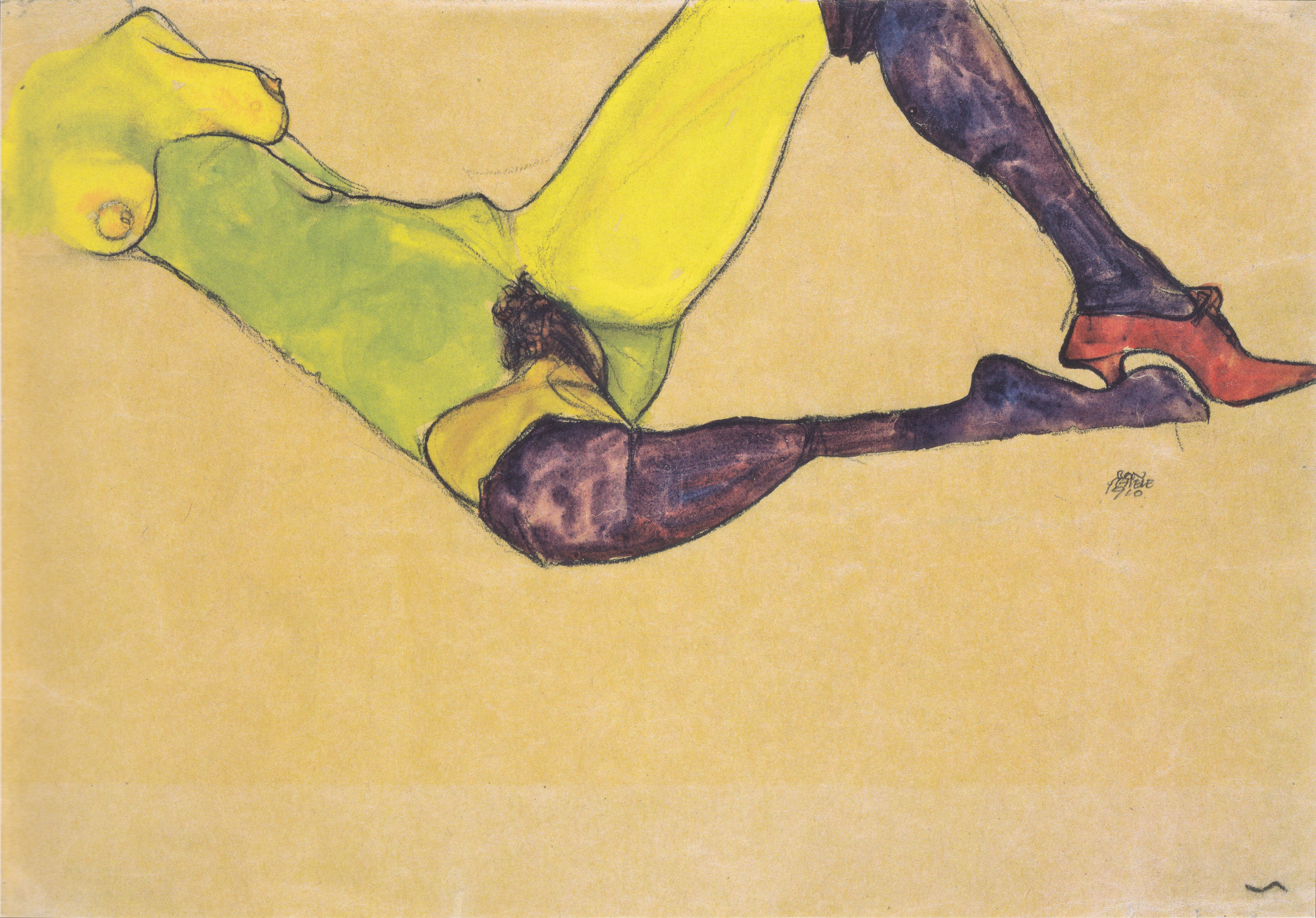
Reclining nude, 1910

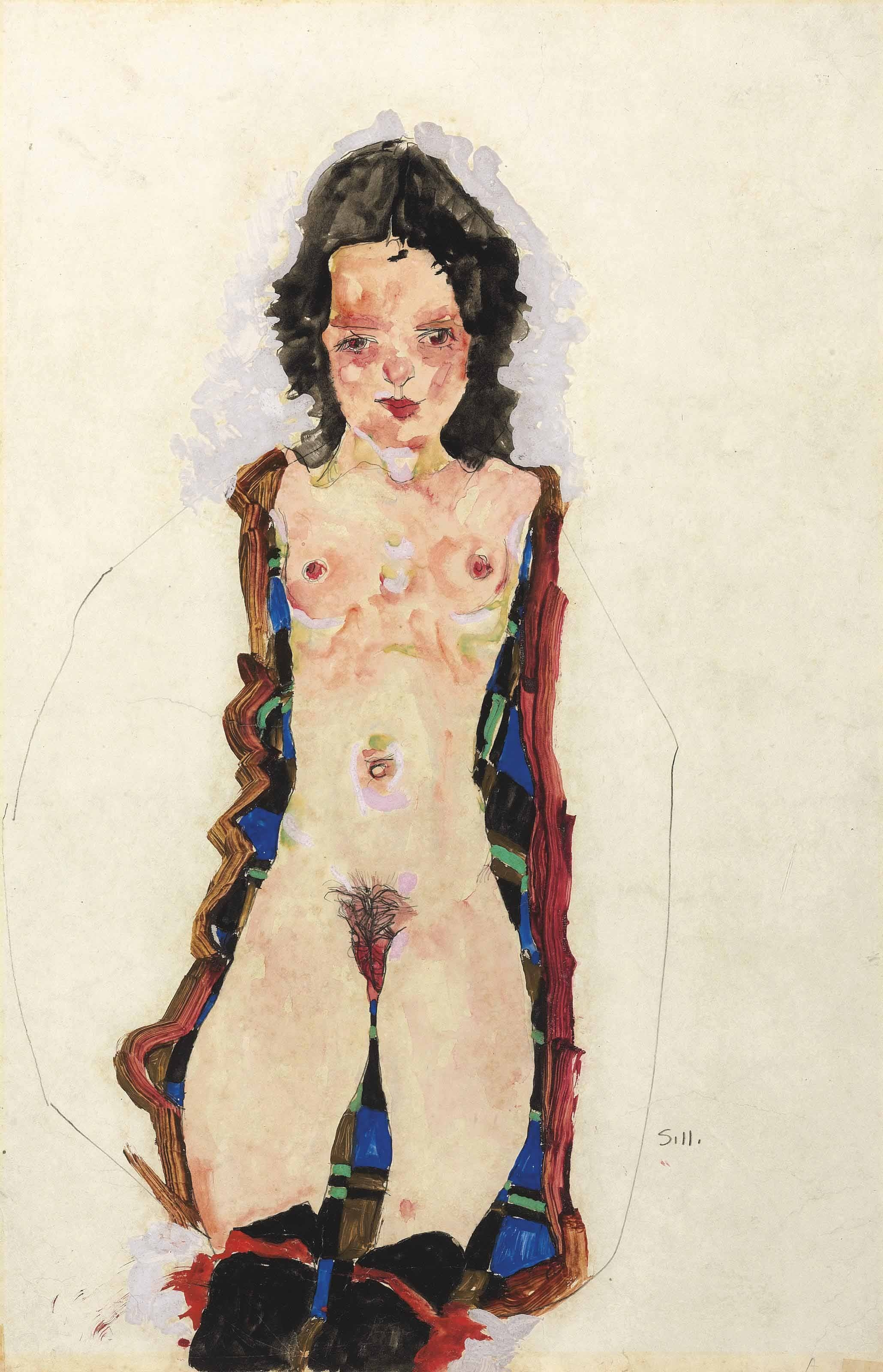
Nude with Red Garters, 1911

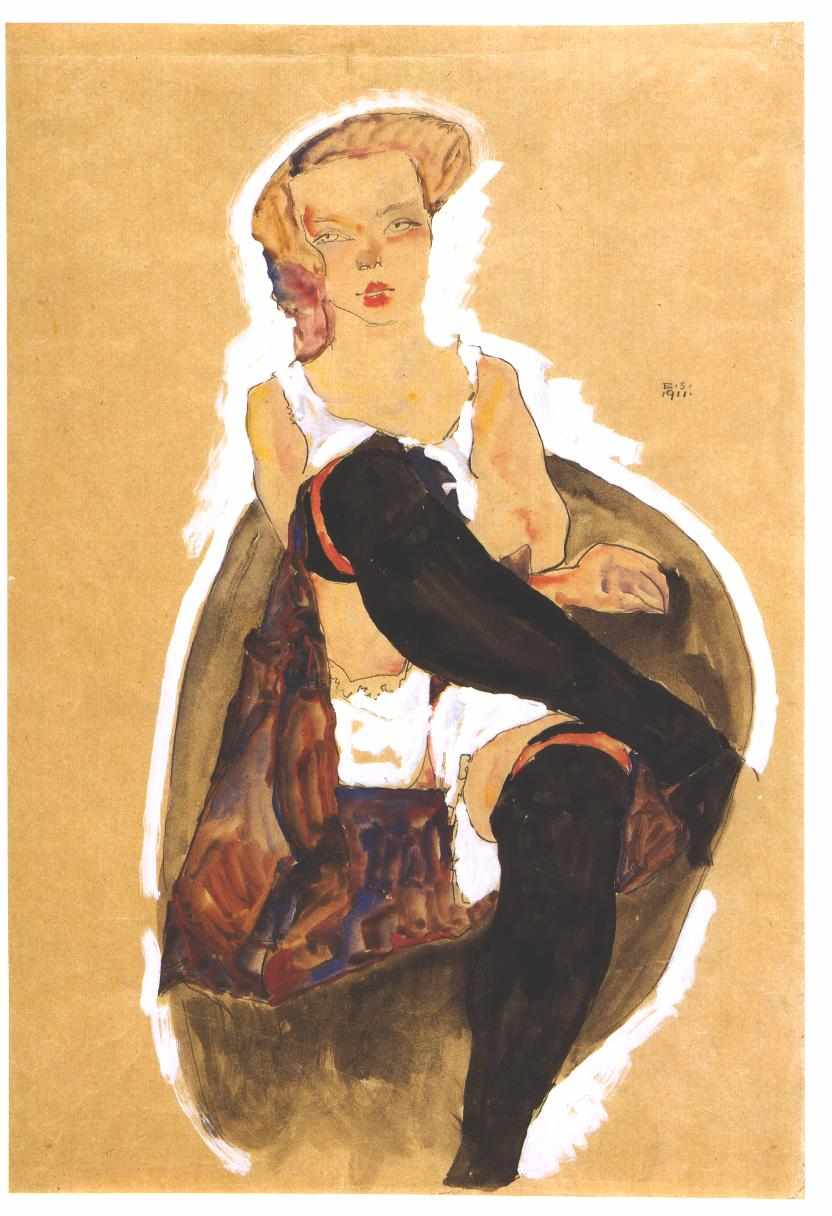
Semi-nude Reclining 1911

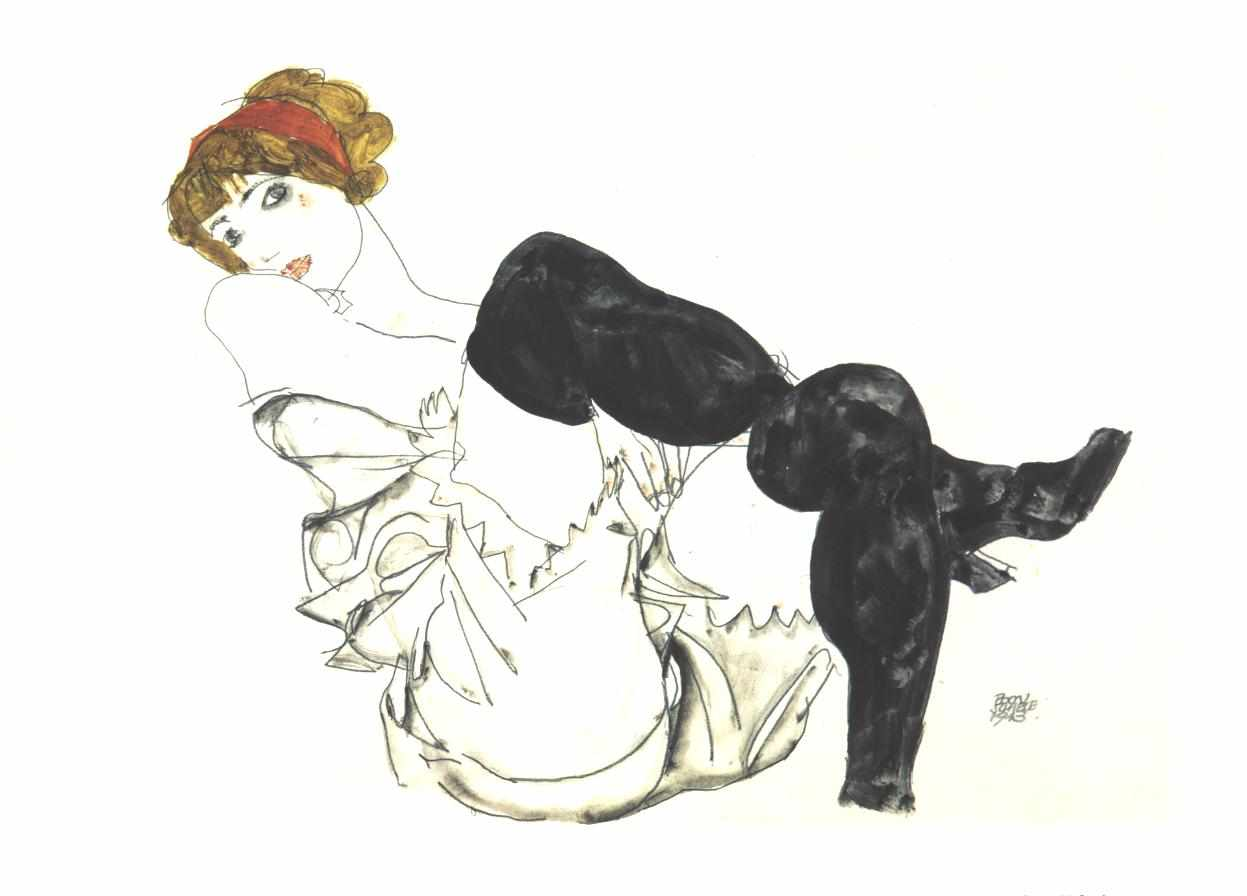
Walburga Neuzil in black stockings, 1913

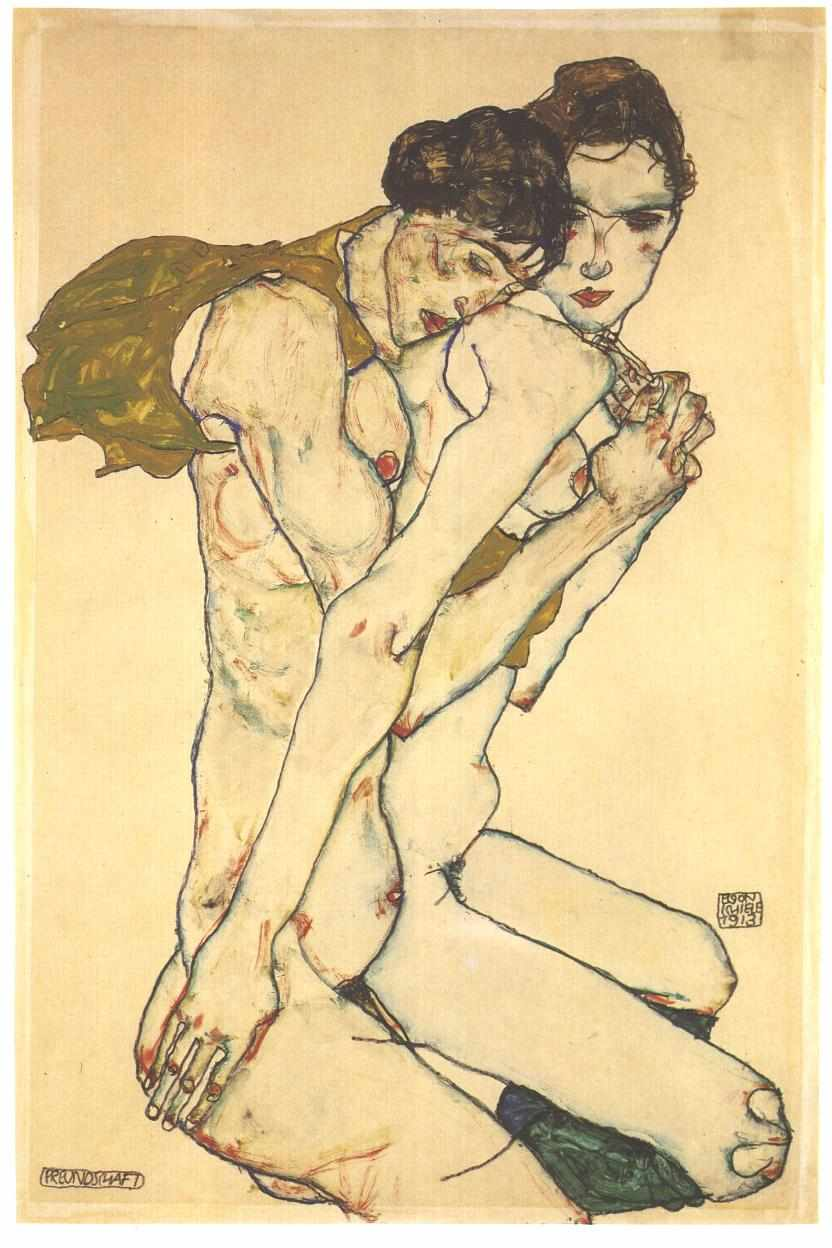
Friendship, 1913

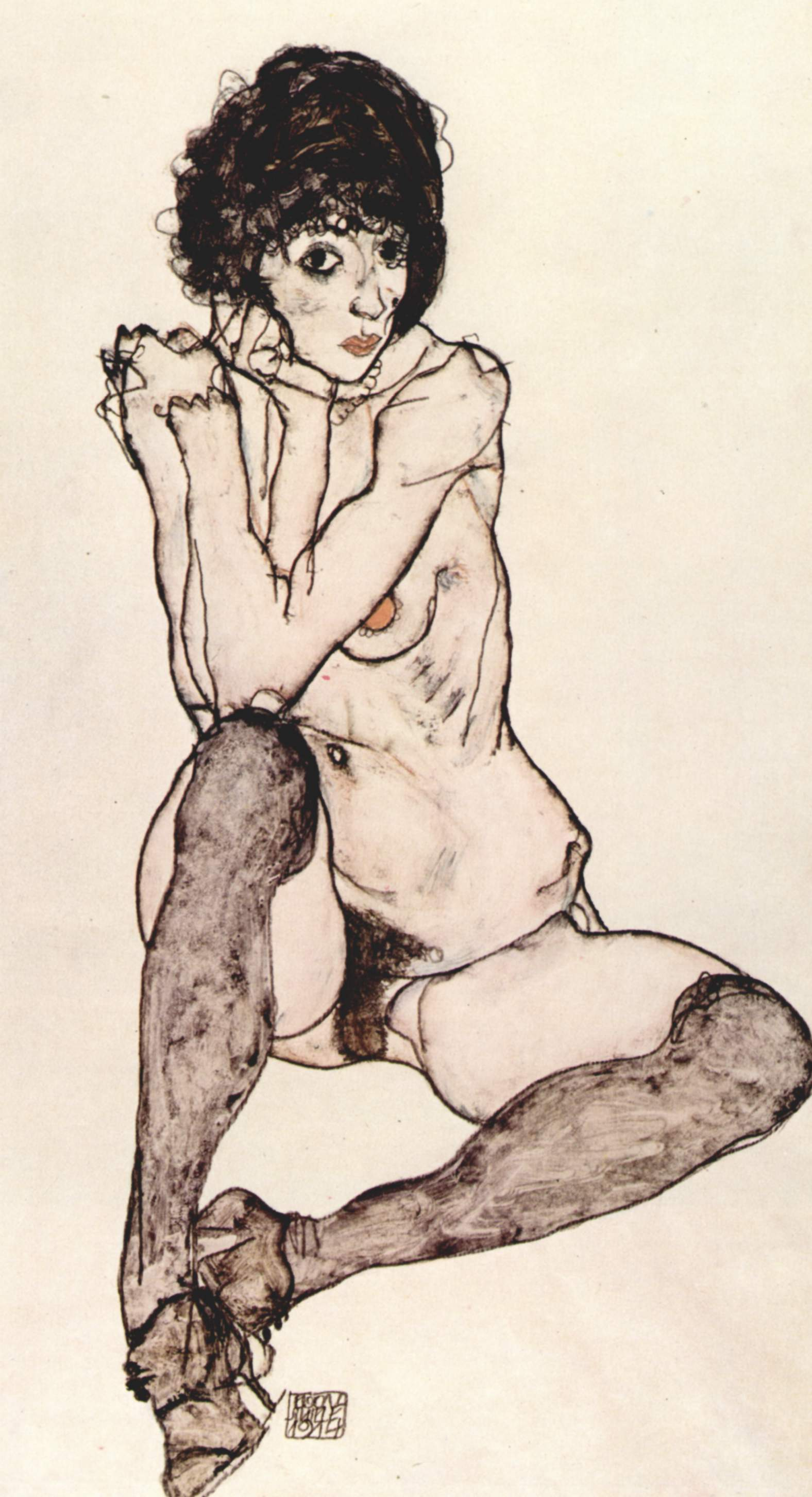
Seated female nude with elbows propped, 1914

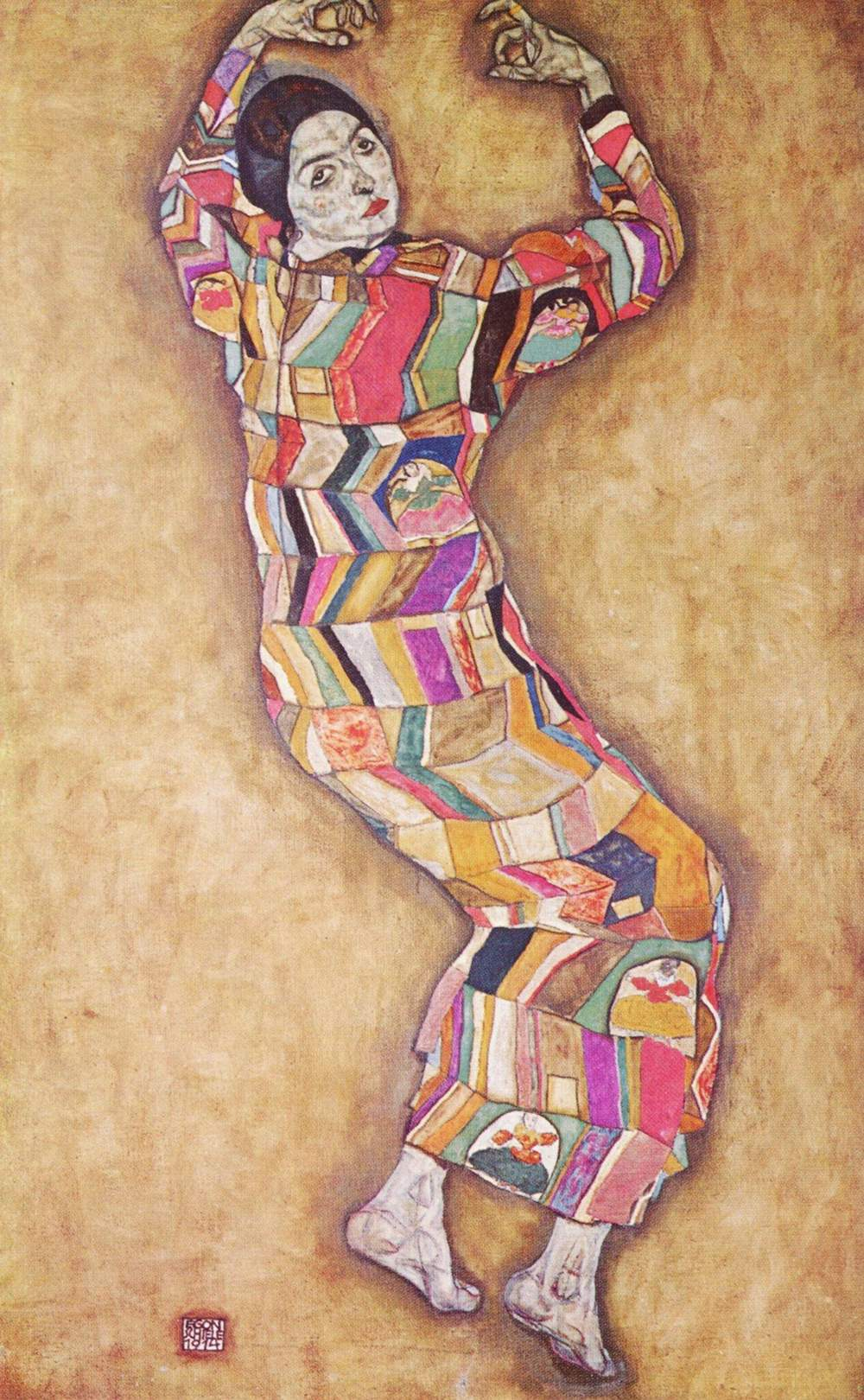
Frederike Beer, 1914

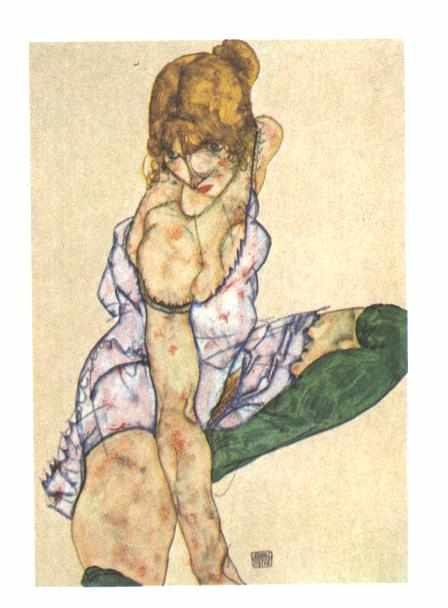
Blonde girl in green stockings, 1914

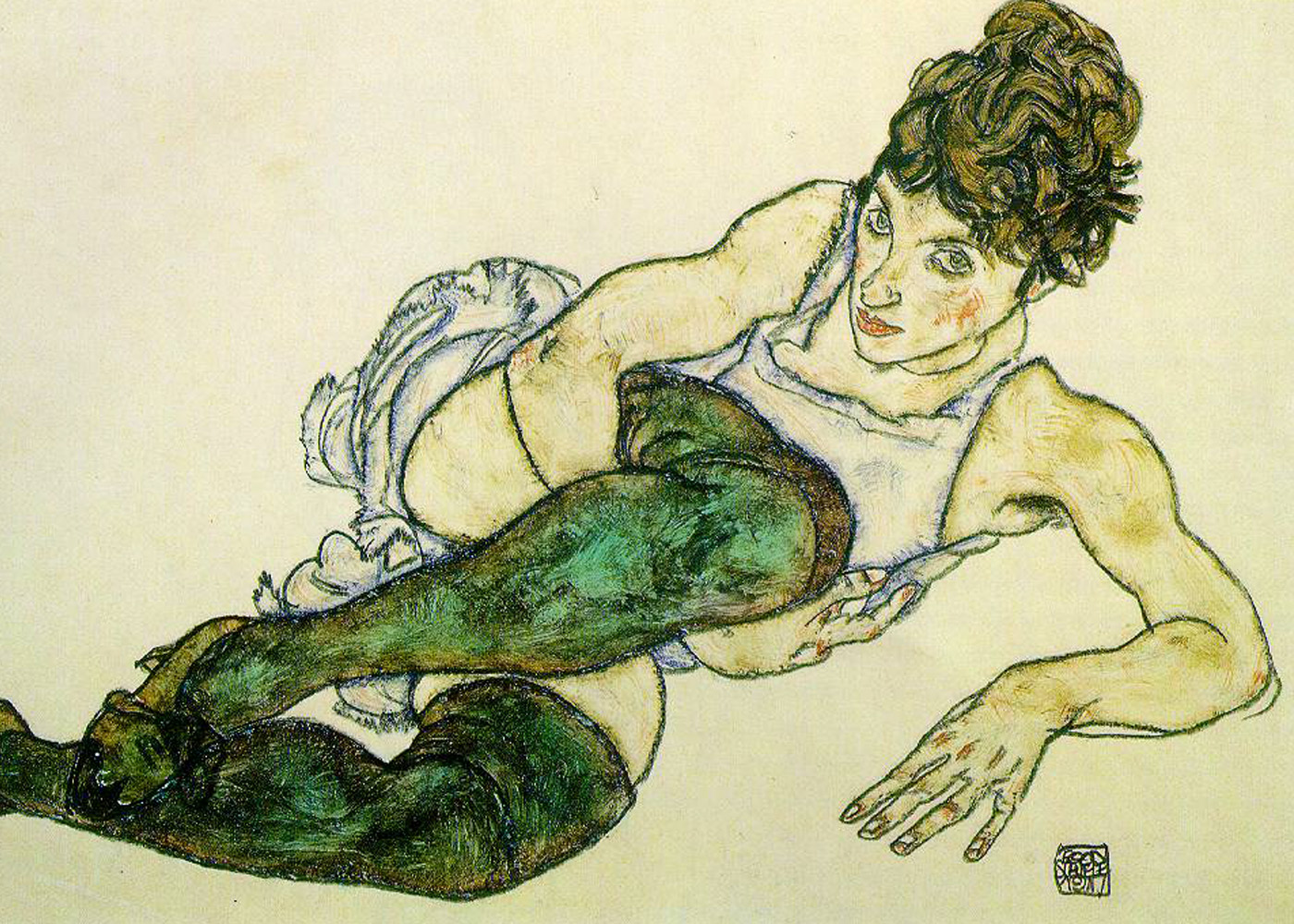
Green Stockings, 1914

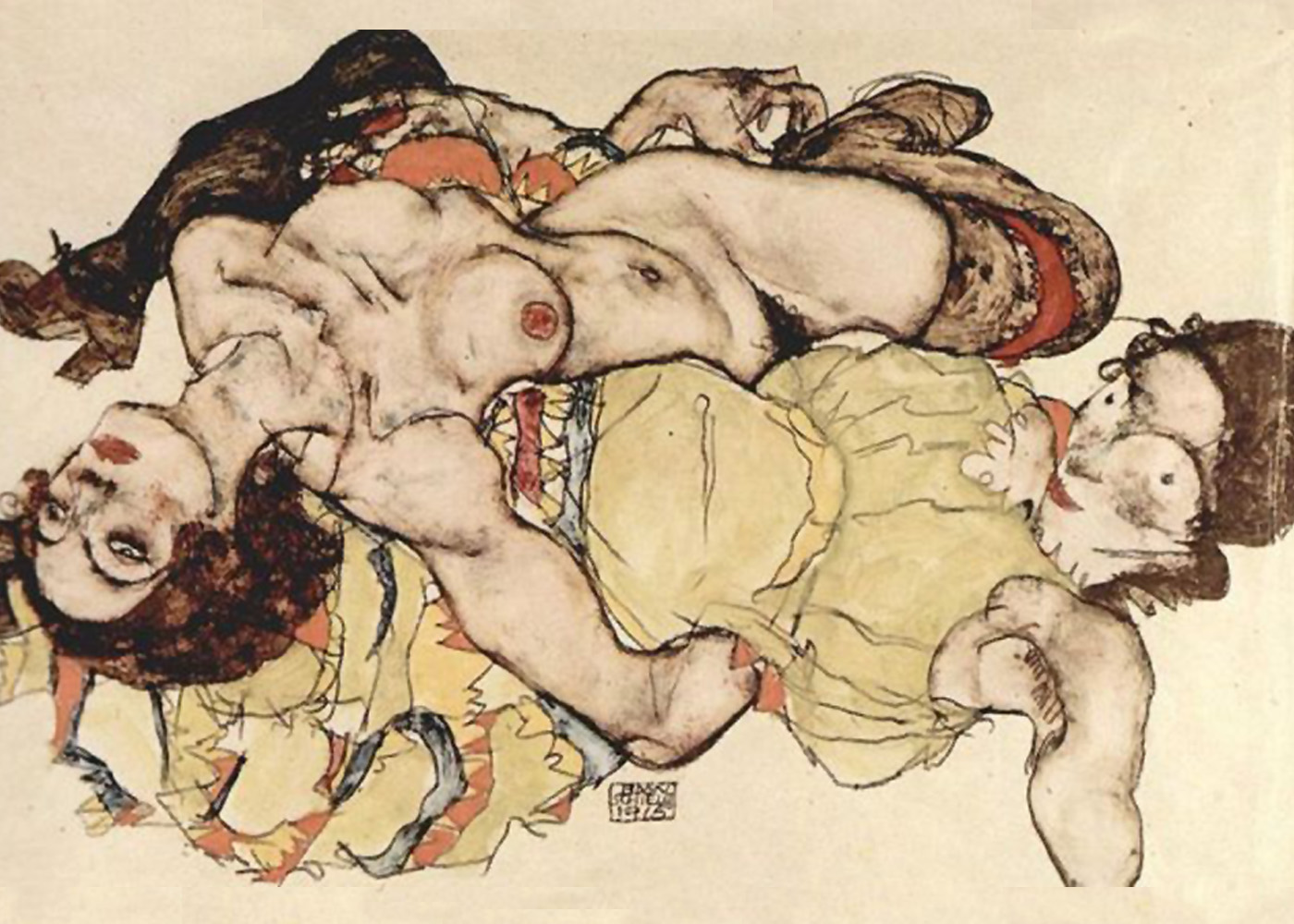
Two Women

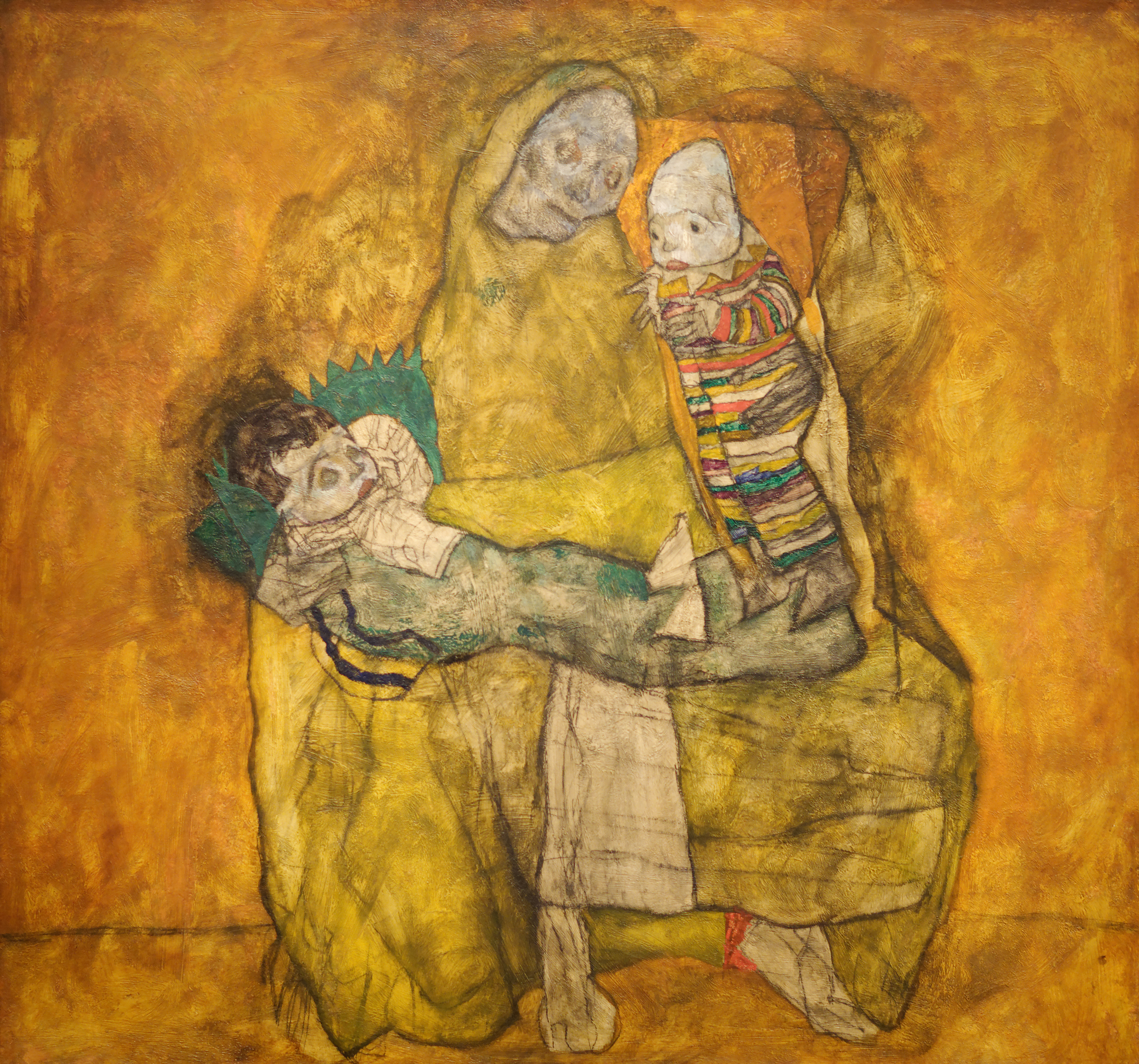
Mother with two children II, 1915 Leopold Museum

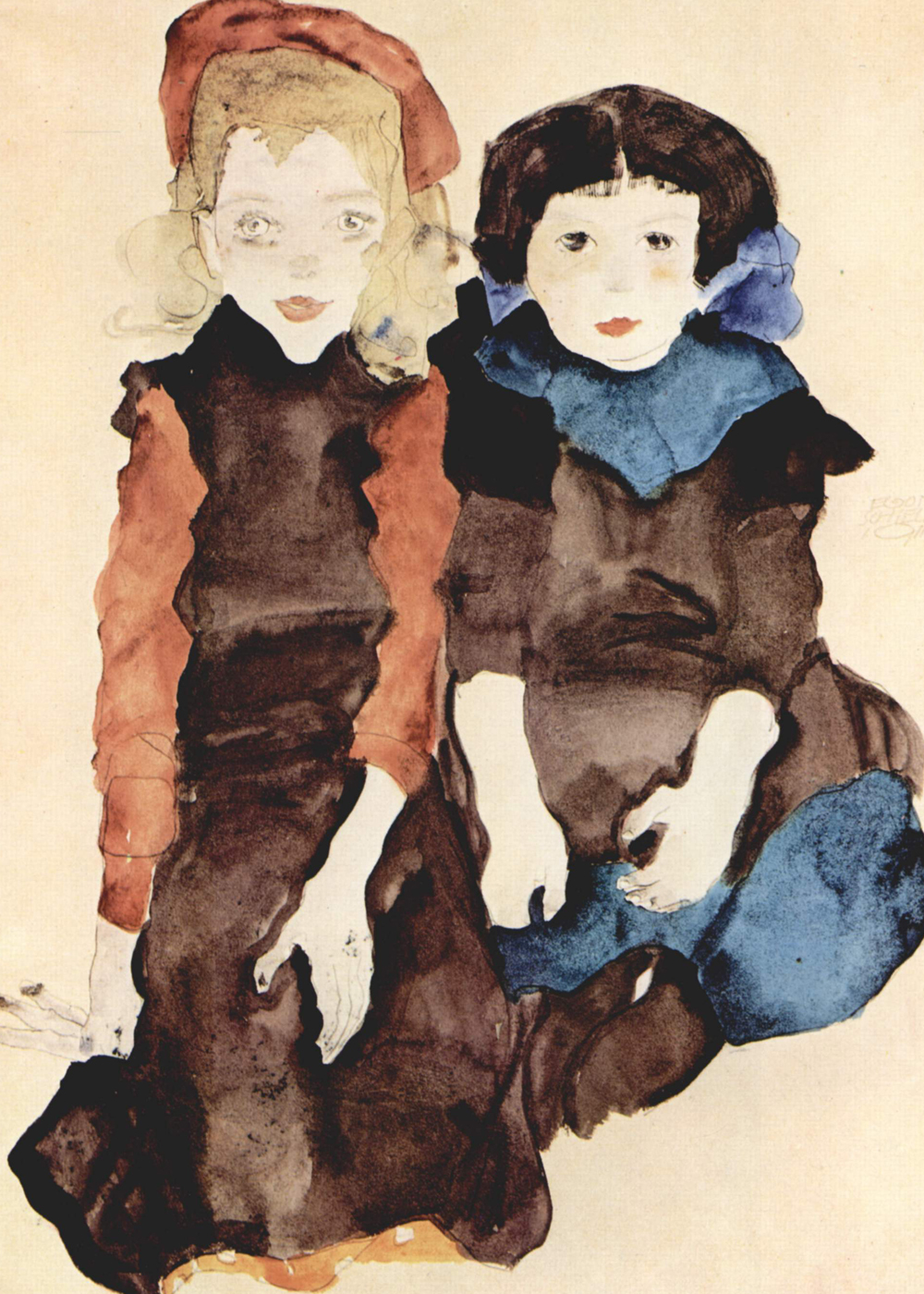
Children

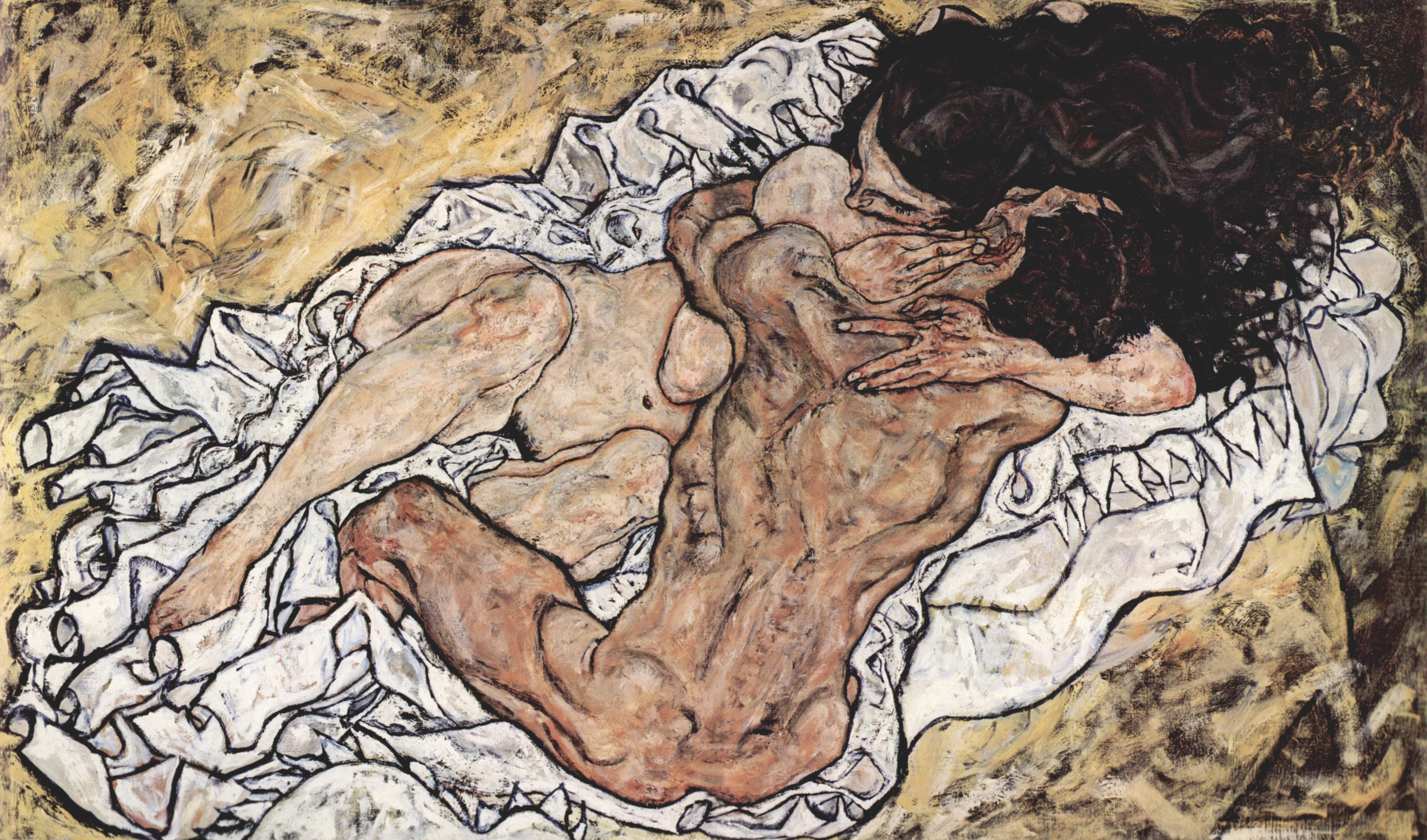
Pair embracing, 1917

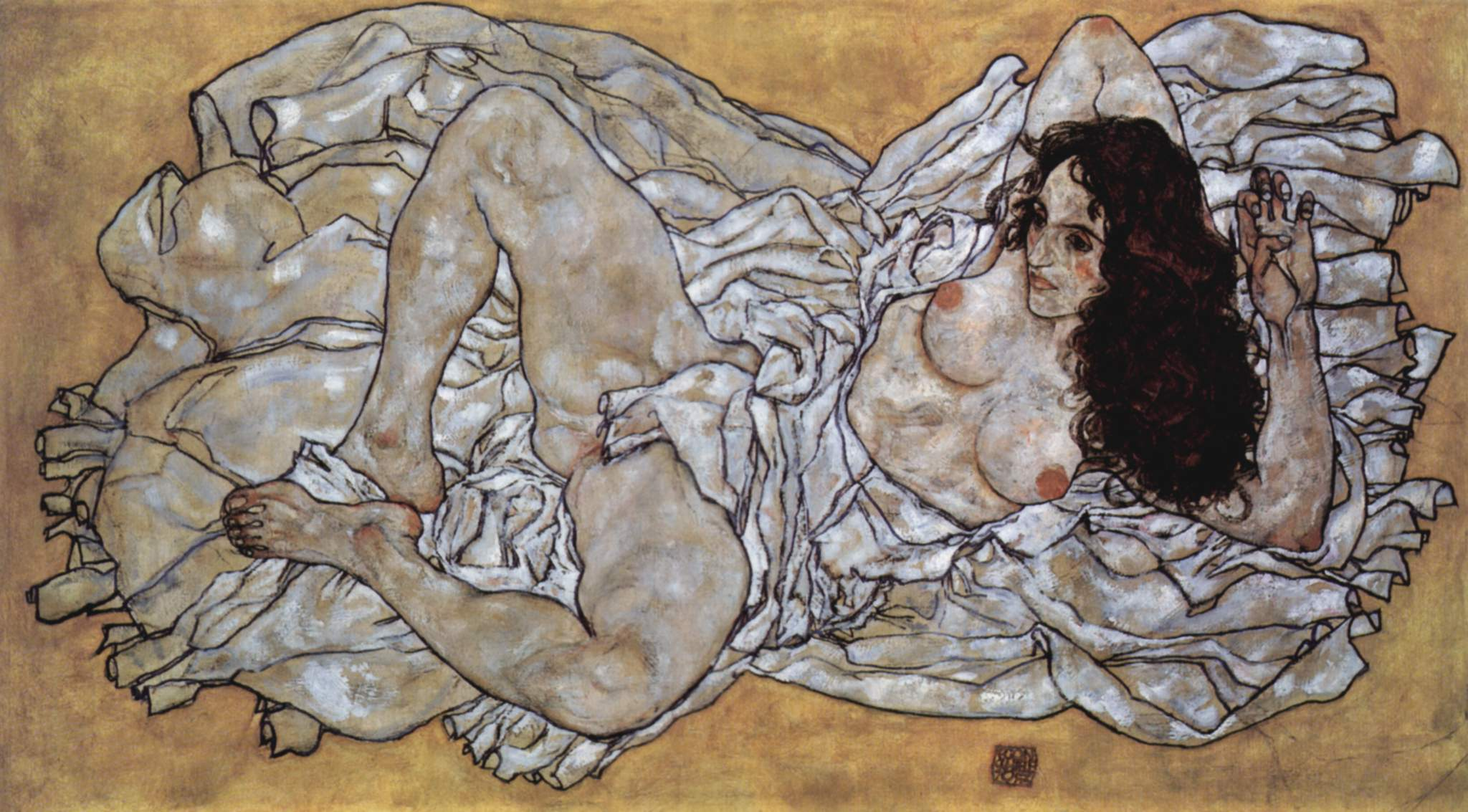
Reclining woman, 1917 Leopold Museum

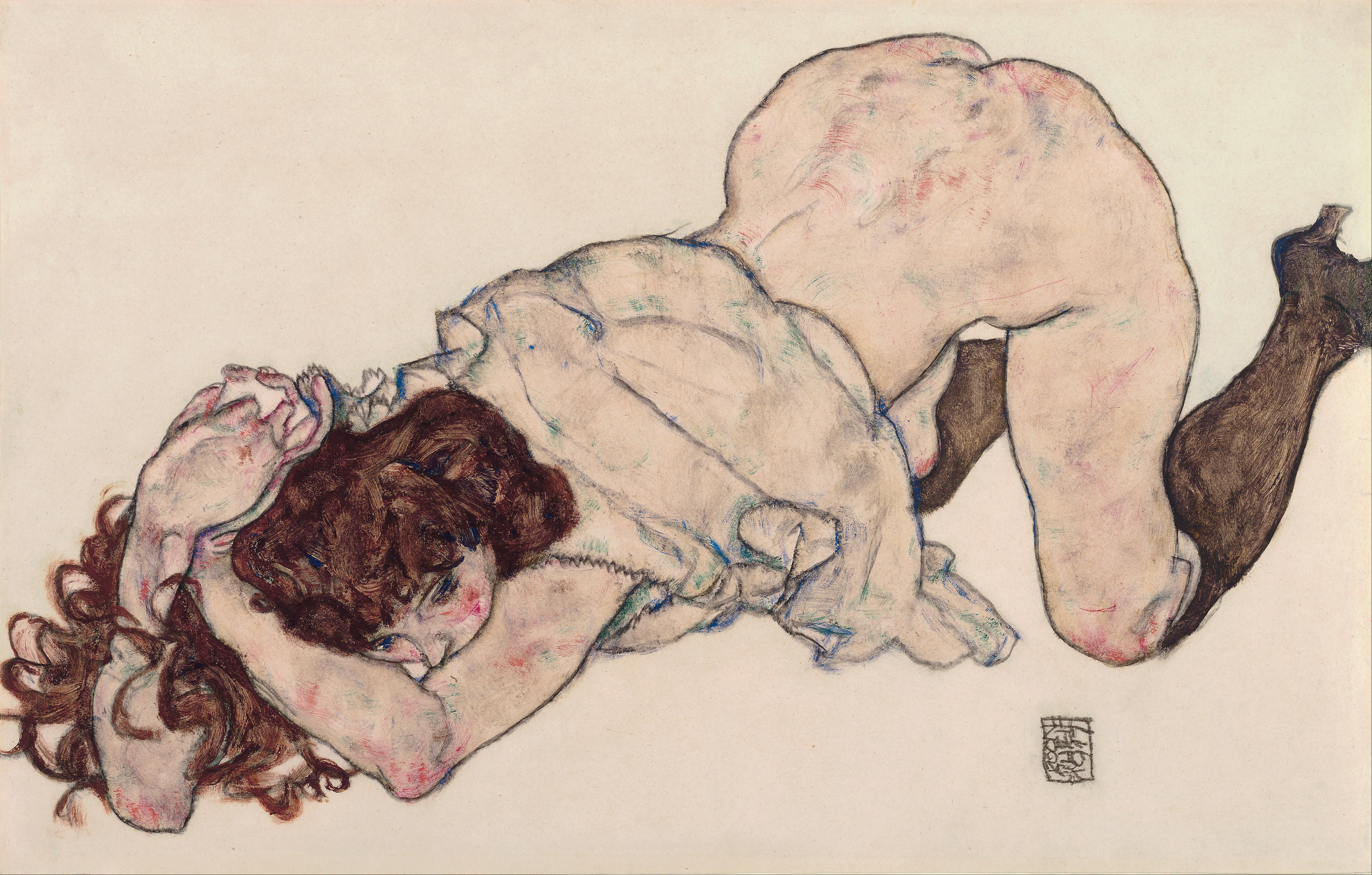
Kneeling Girl, Resting on Both Elbows 1917 Leopold Museum

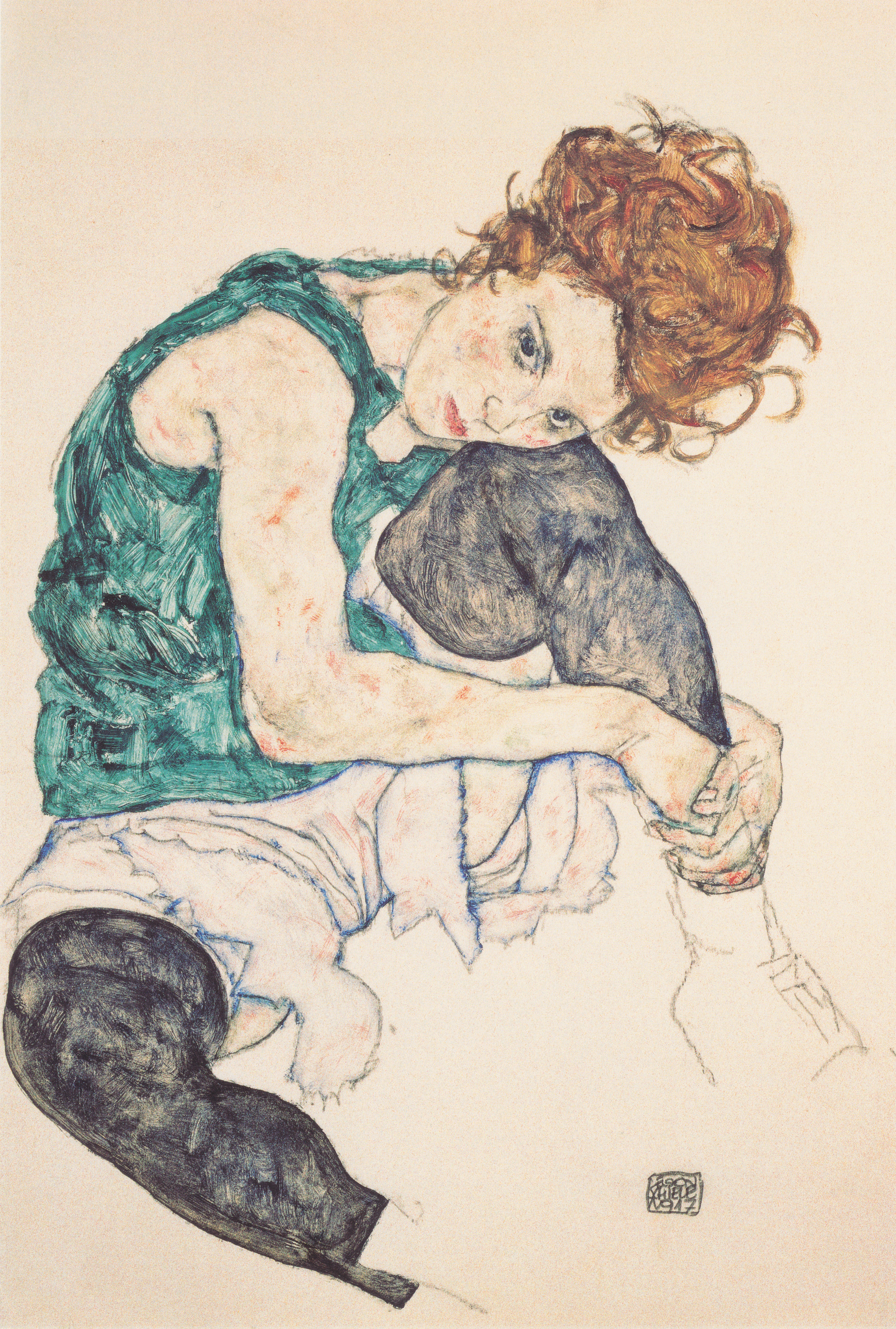
Seated woman with bent knees, 1917, National Gallery Prague

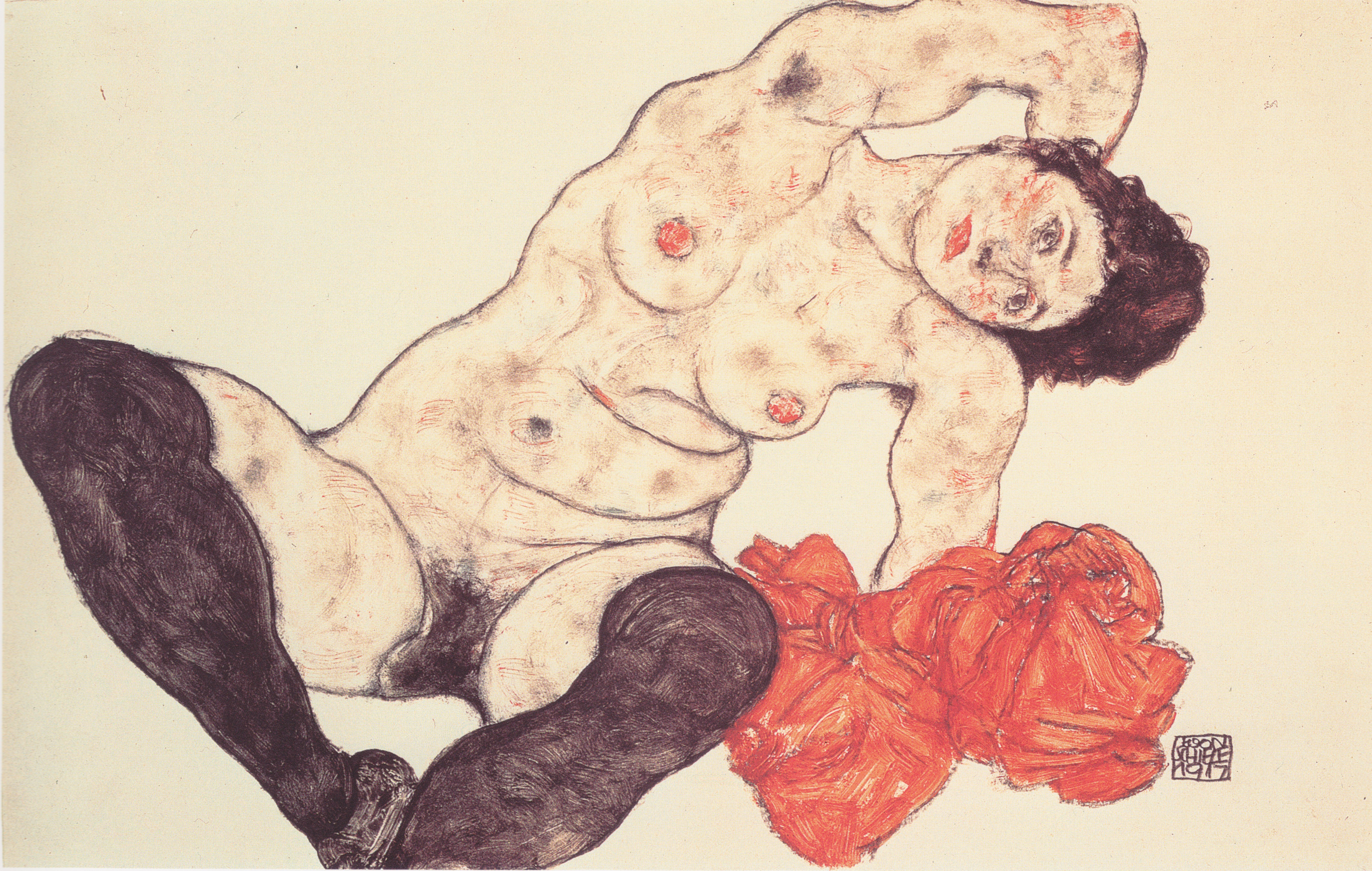
Sitting girl, 1917

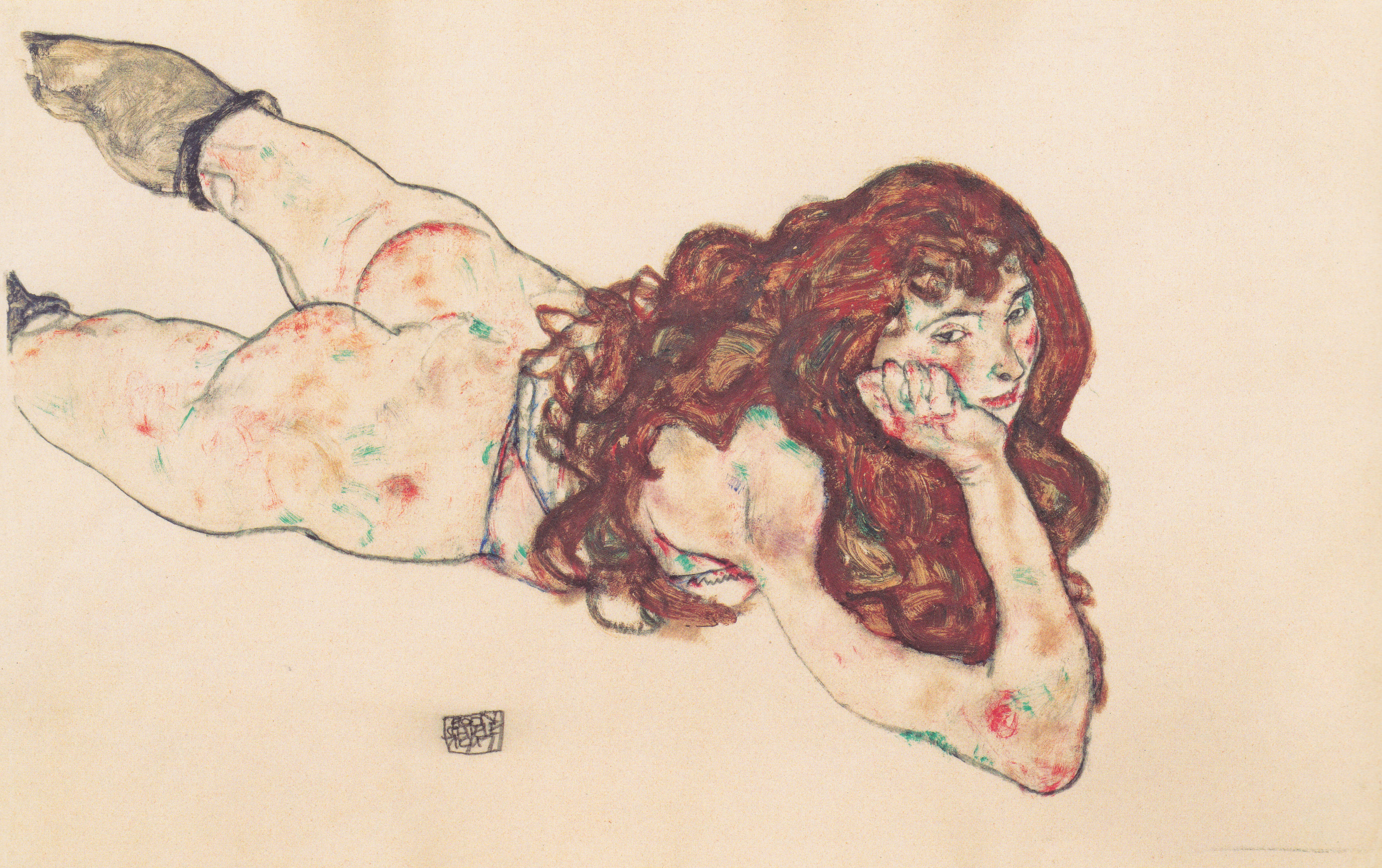
Nude, 1917

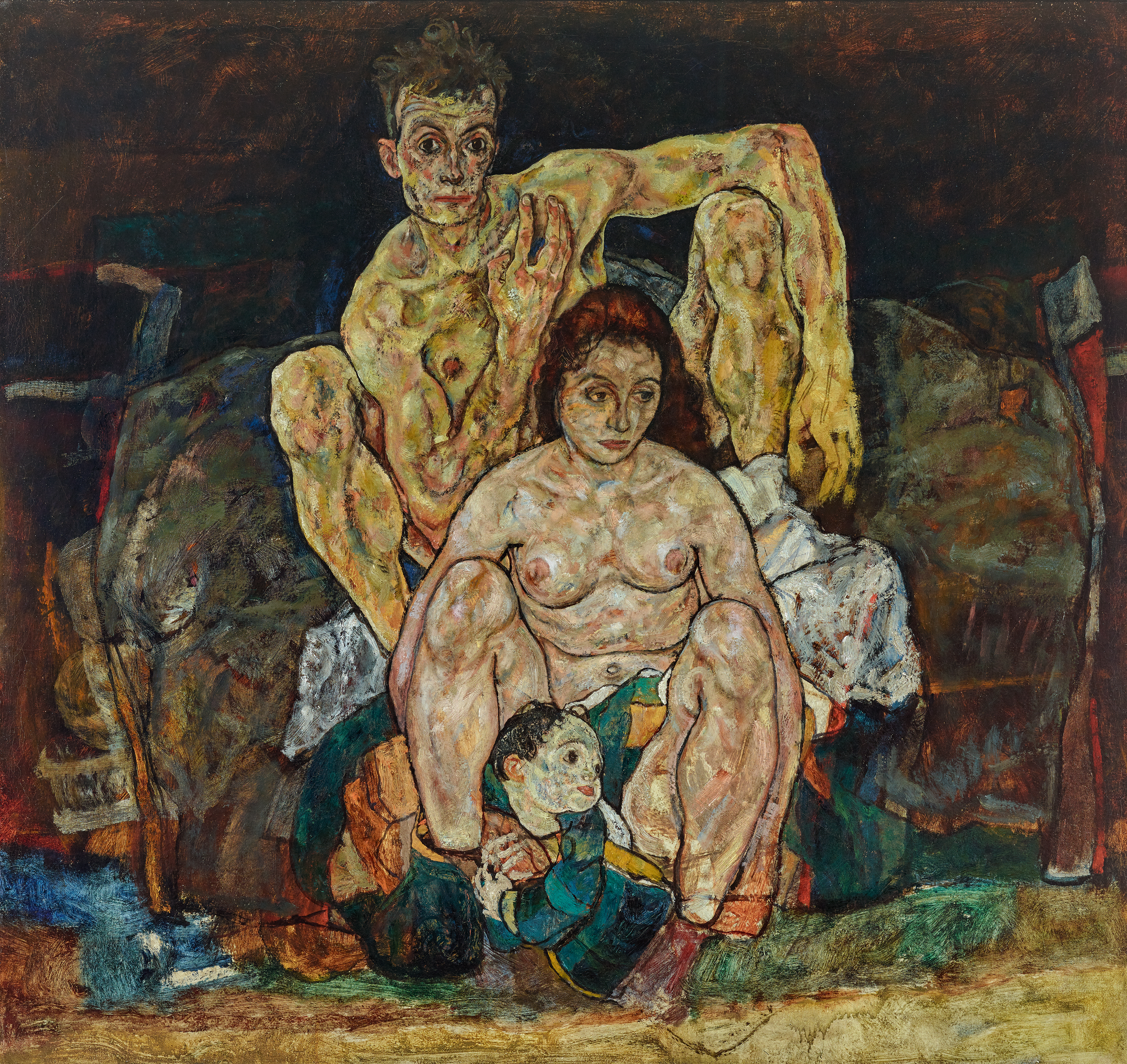
The Family, 1918, Österreichische Galerie Belvedere, Vienna

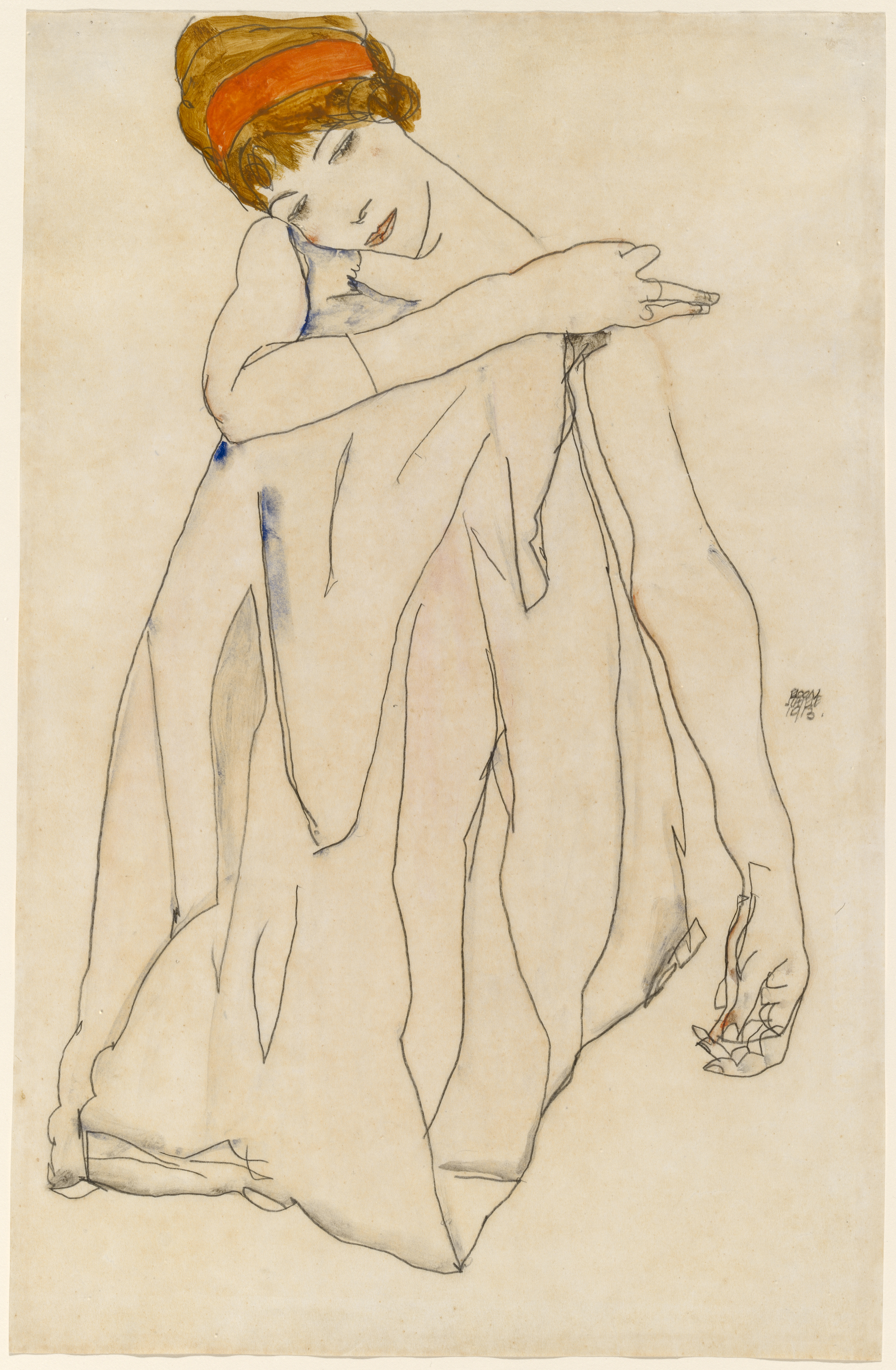
Dancer (Die Tänzerin), 1913

== Landscapes ==
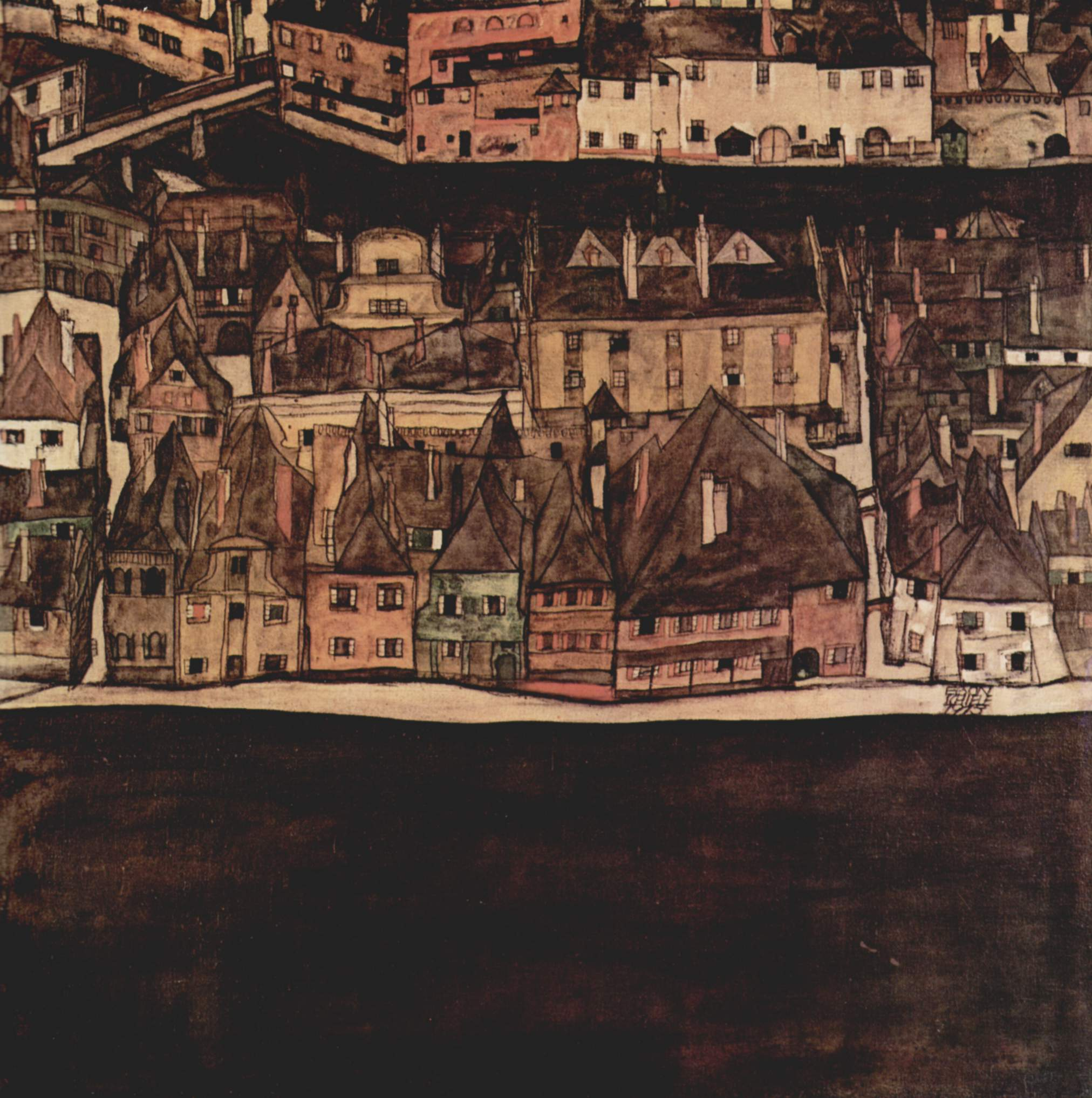
Die kleine Stadt III, 1912–1913, view of Krumau an der Moldau Leopold Museum, Vienna

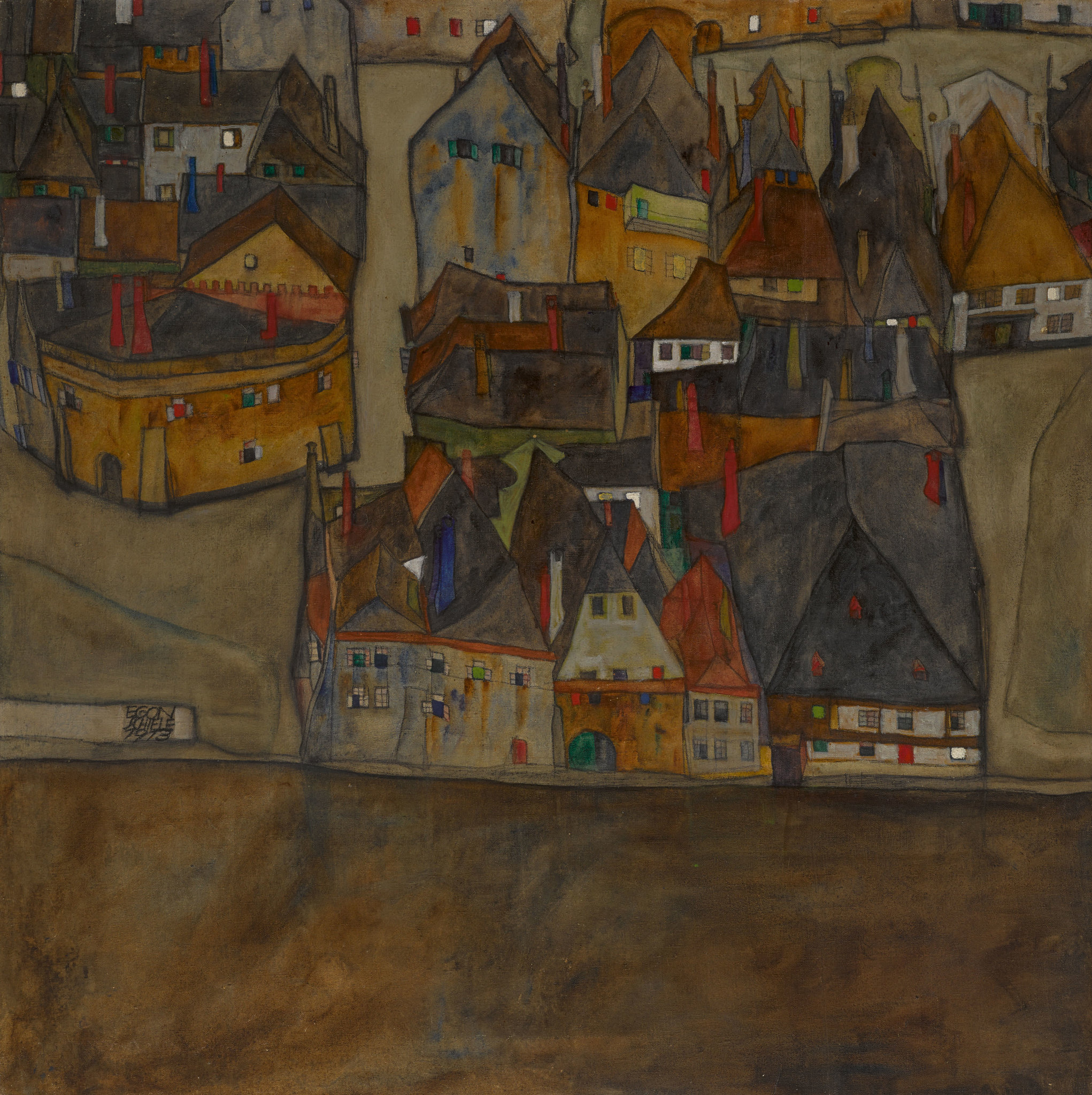
Dämmernde Stadt, 1913, Private collection

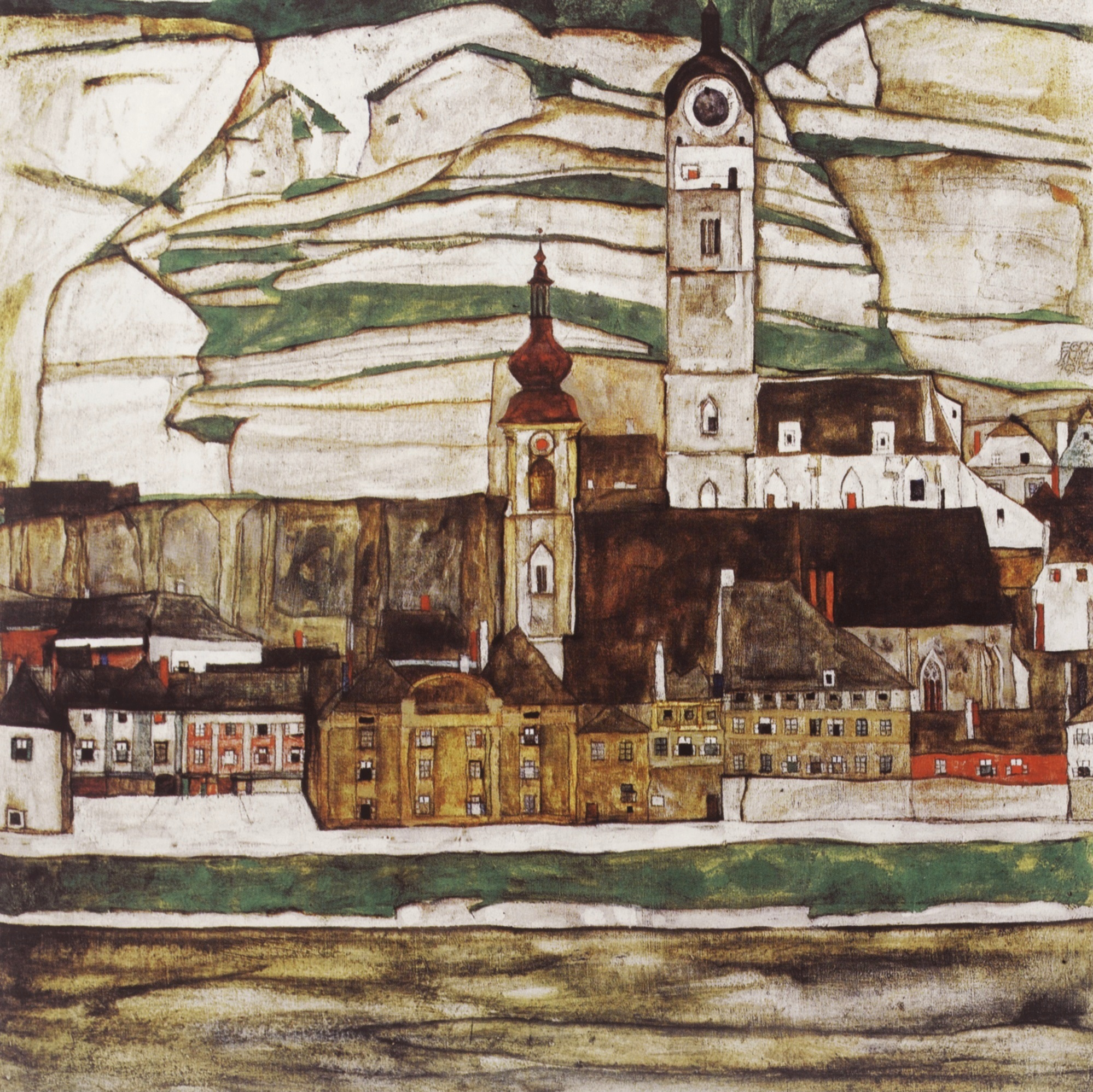
Stein an der Donau II, 1913, Neue Galerie, New York

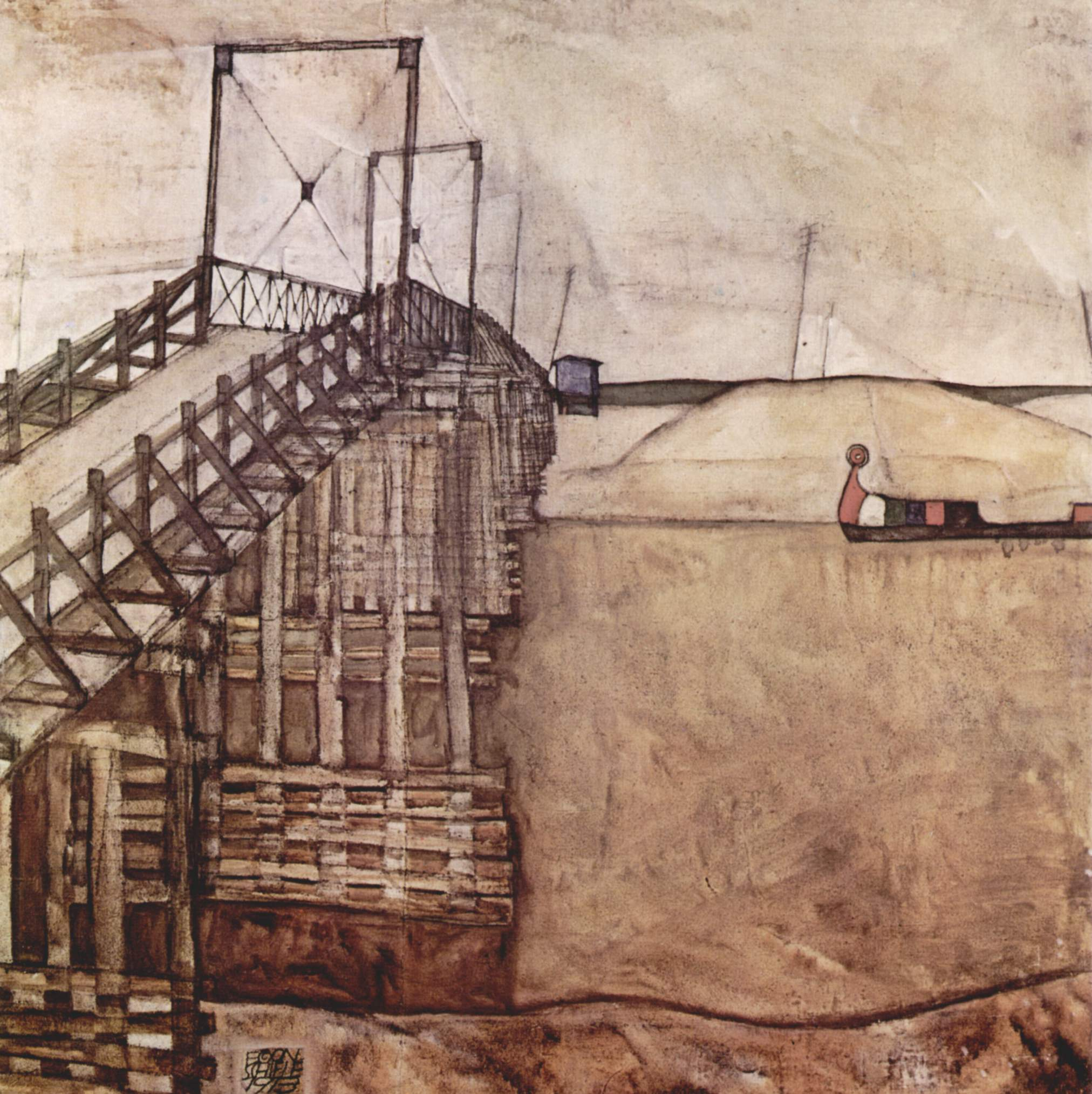
The Bridge (Die Brücke), 1913, Private collection

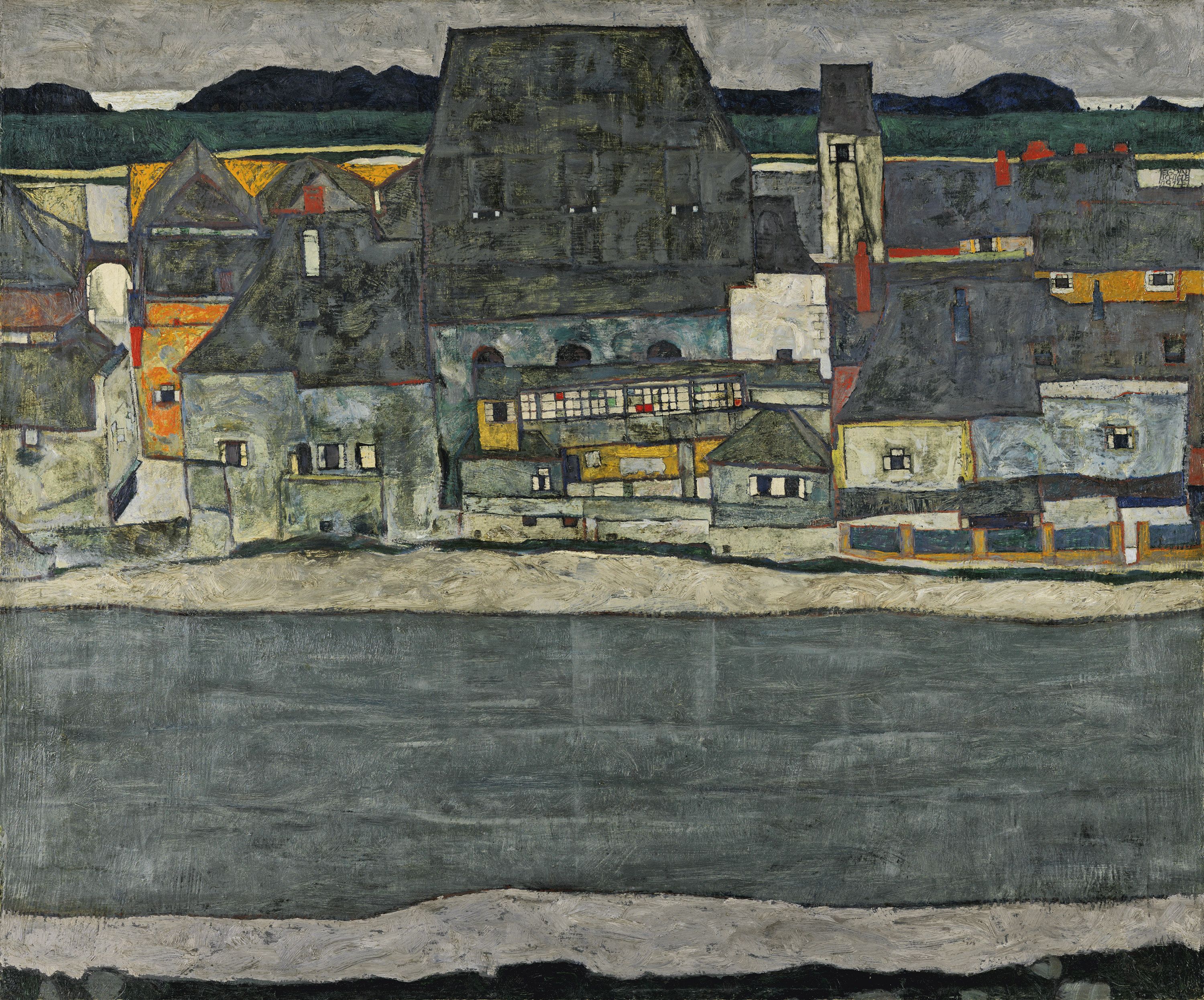
Houses on the River (Häuser am Fluss), 1914, Thyssen-Bornemisza Museum, Madrid

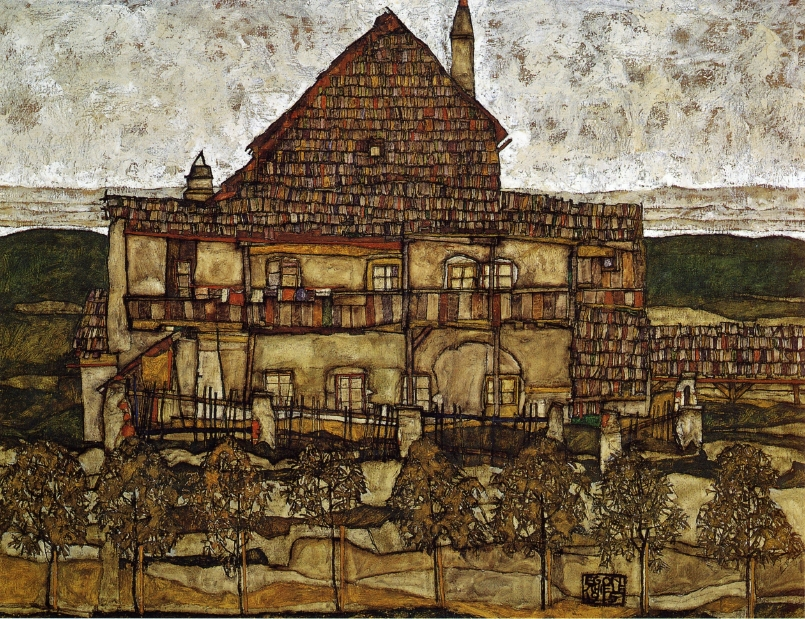
House with Shingle Roof (Old House II), 1915 Leopold Museum, Vienna

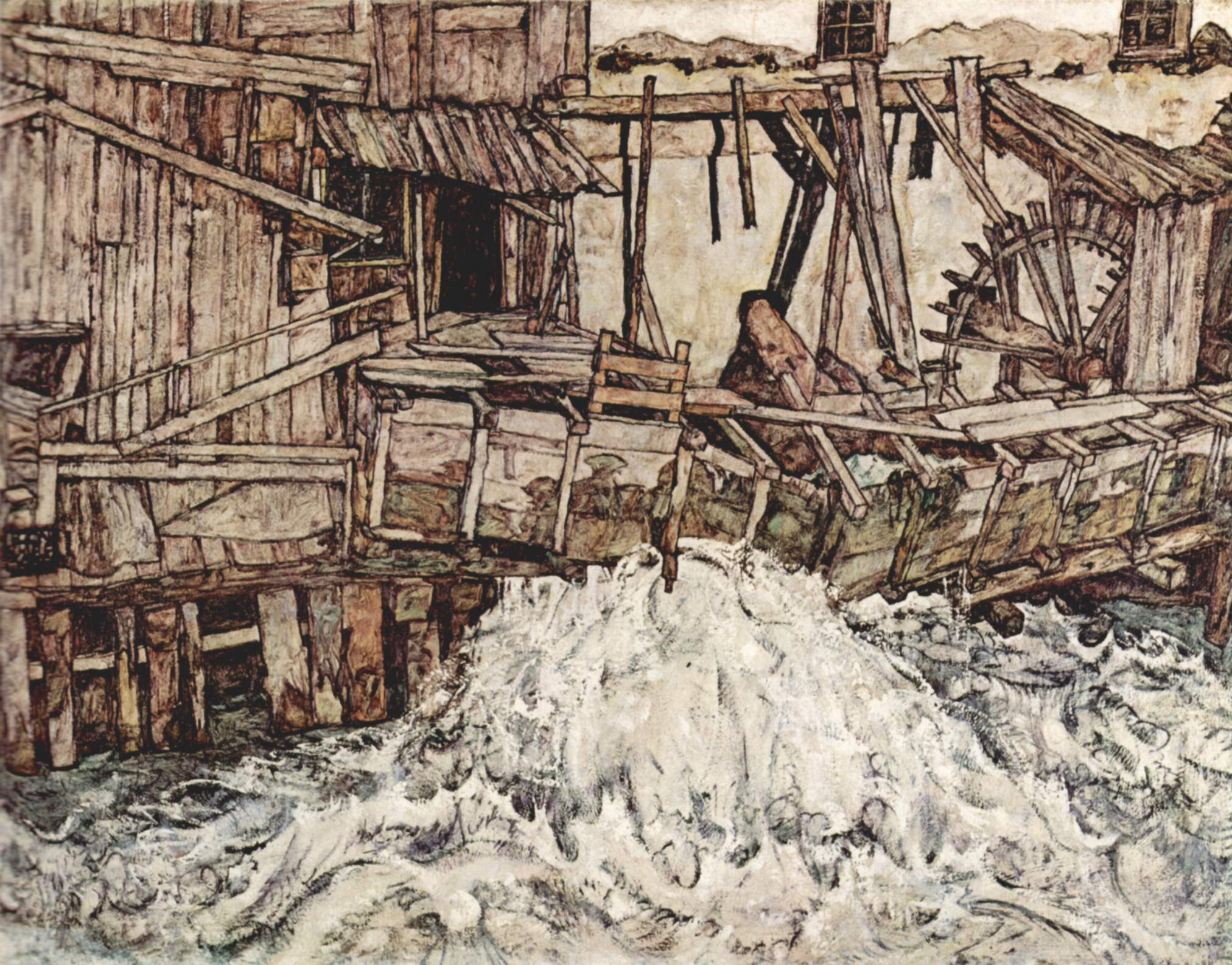
Old Mill (Alte Mühle), 1916

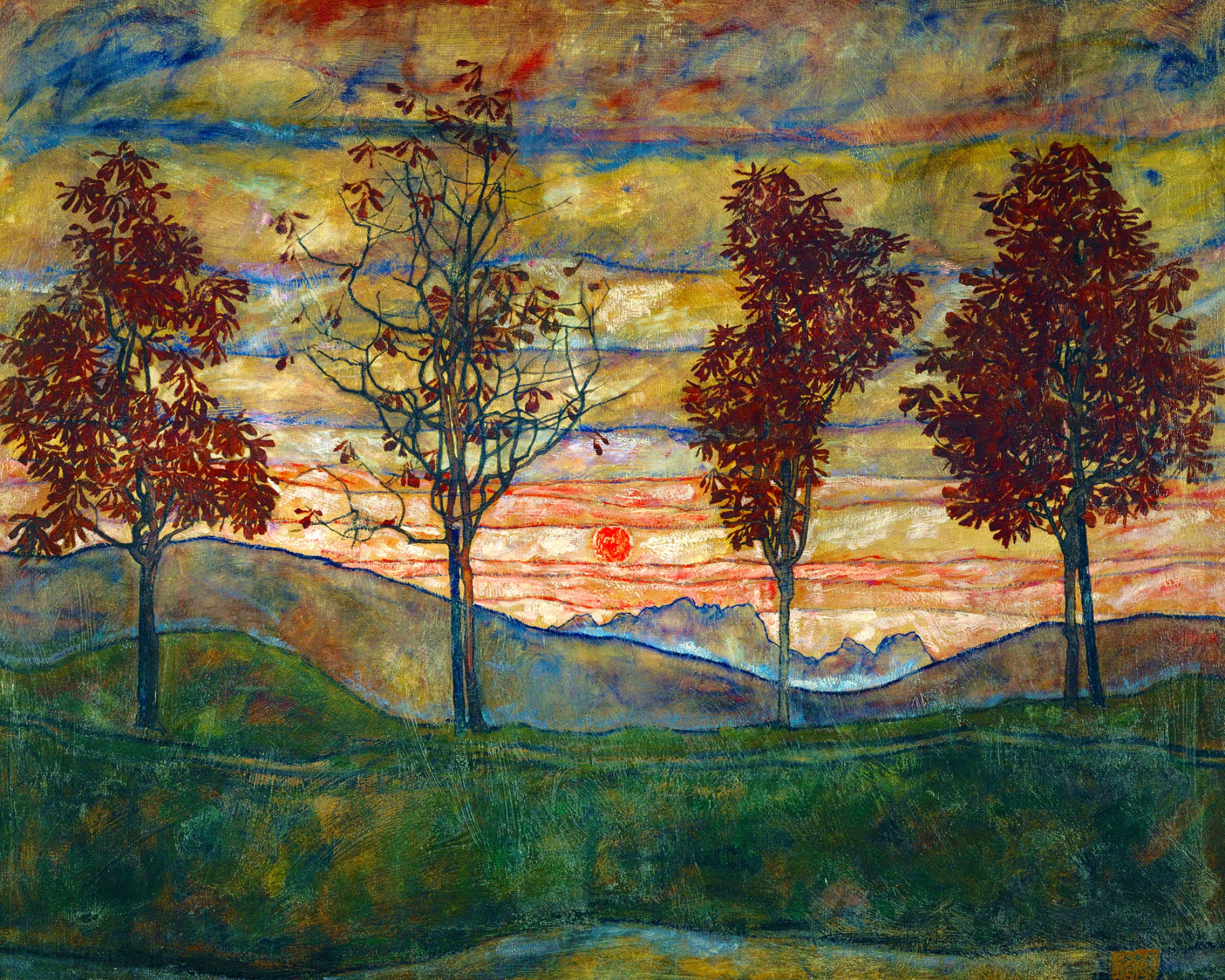
Four trees (Vier Bäume), 1917, Österreichische Galerie Belvedere, Vienna

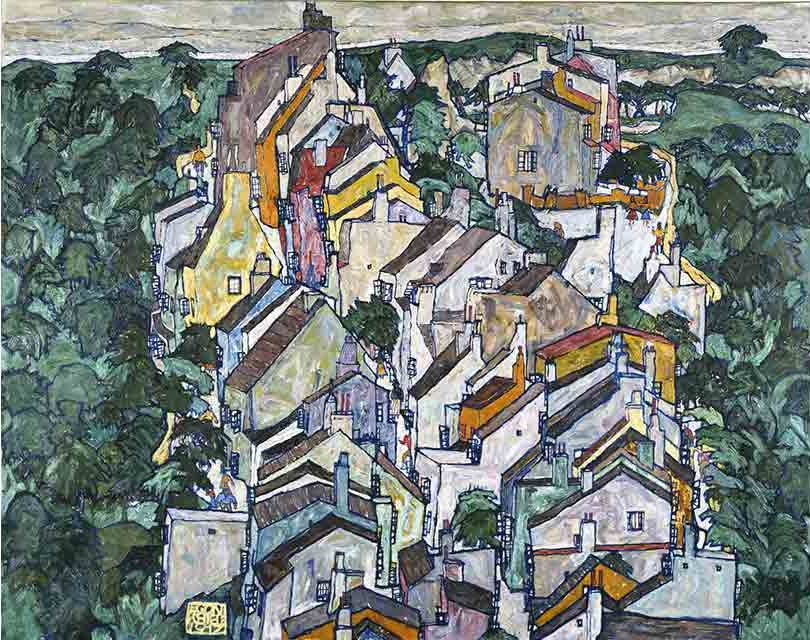
Town among Greenery (The Old City III), 1917, Neue Galerie, New York

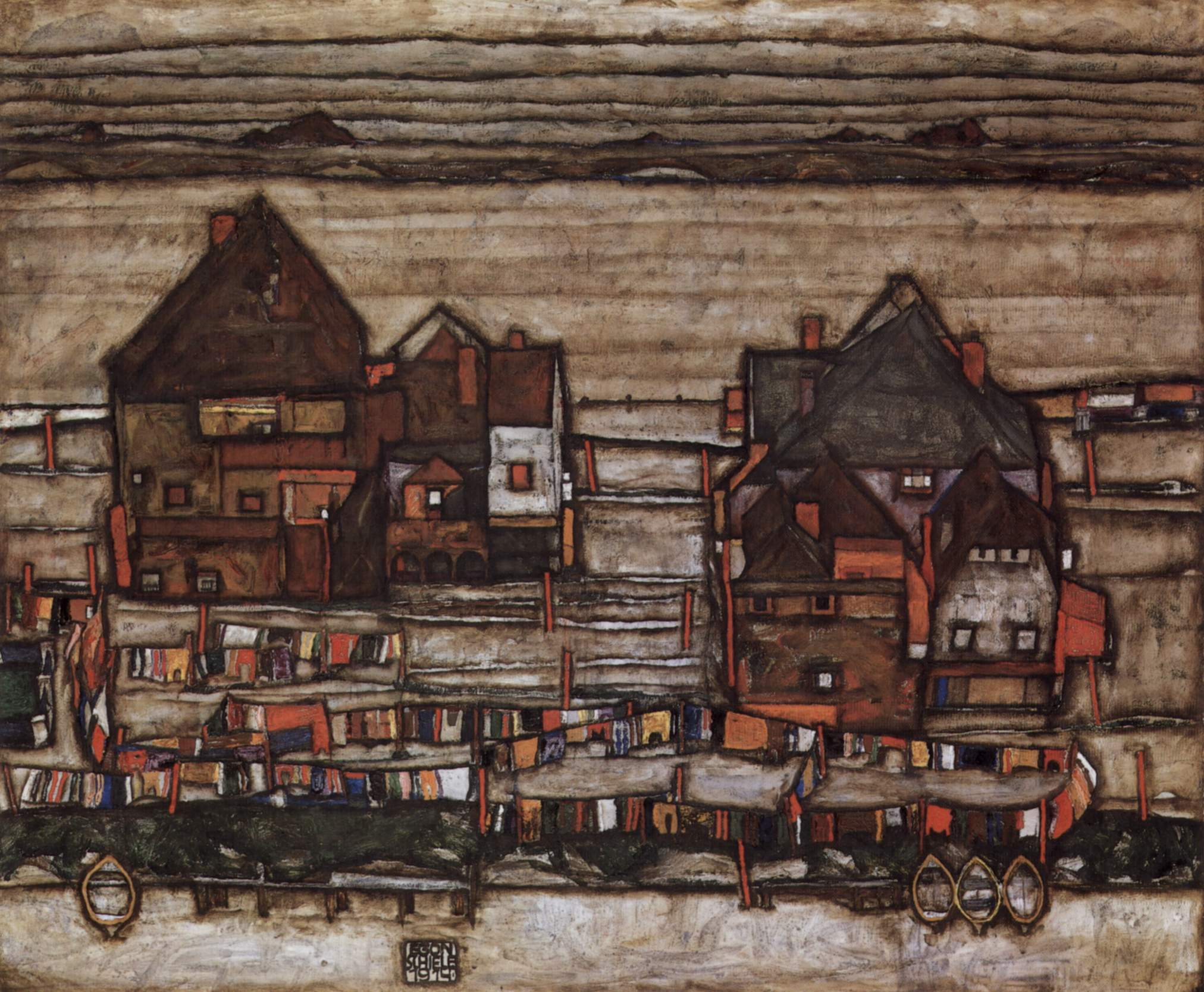
Houses with Clothelines (Häuser mit Wäscheleinen oder Vorstadt)
