= Harnoncourt =

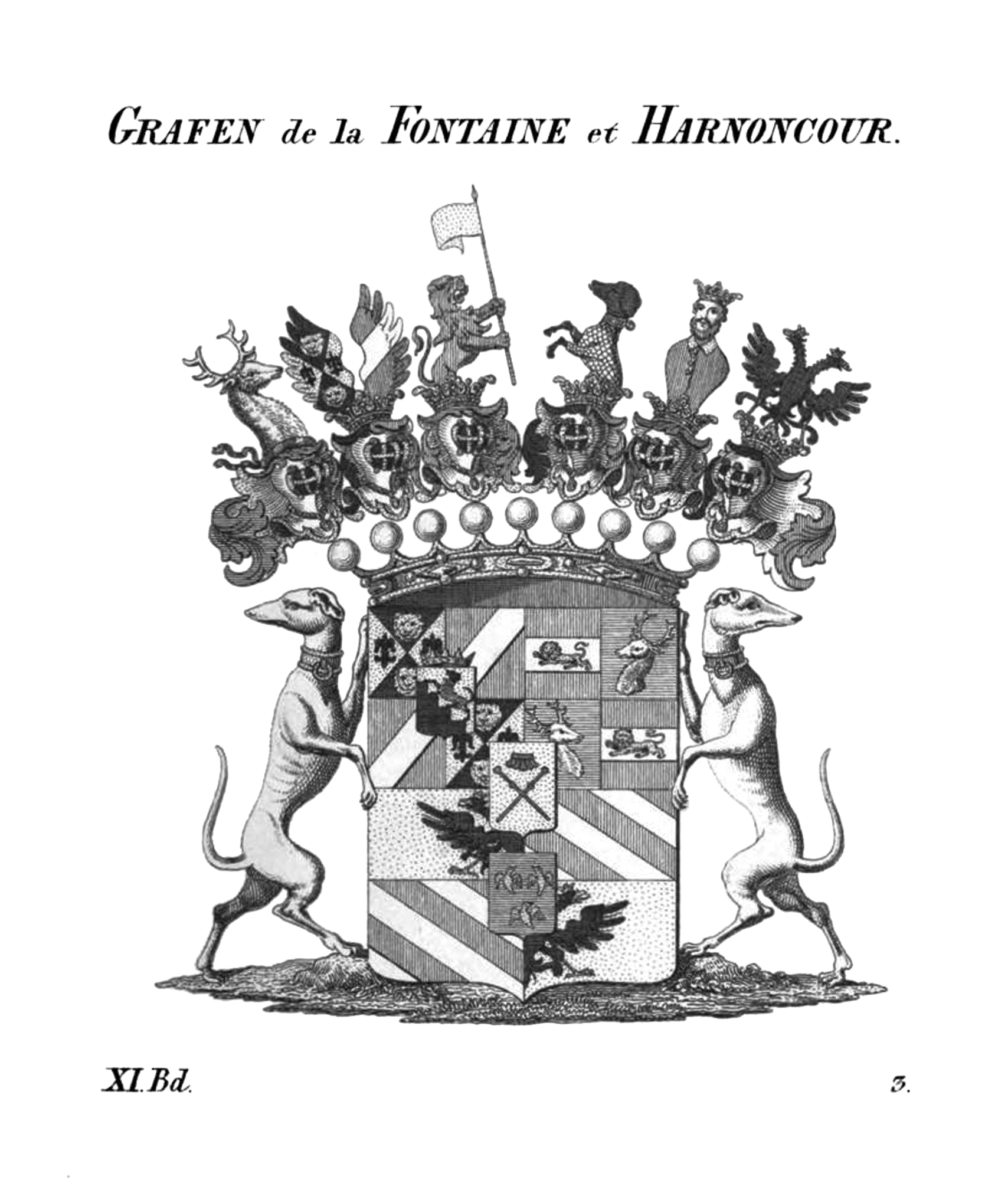
Coat of arms of Counts von Harnoncourt-Unverzagt

The Harnoncourt-Unverzagt family is an old Austrian noble family, which came to Austria from the Duchy of Lorraine, but originated in Luxembourg.

== History ==
Counts d'Harnoncourt intermarried with Unverzagt family in the 18th century when Joseph Ludwig Matthias de la Fontaine, Count of Harnoncourt (1736–1816) married Countess Maria Leopoldine Unverzagt (1754–1835), who was the last of her line.

Their son Count Herbert Ludwig de la Fontaigne, Count of Harnoncourt (1789–1846), took over her coat of arms in 1839 and called himself Graf von Harnoncourt-Unverzagt.

All members of this aristocratic family have descended from him and his wife, Countess Sophie von Haugwitz (1798–1859).

== Notable members ==
- Alice d'Harnoncourt (1930–2022), Austrian violinist, wife of Nikolaus
- Anne d'Harnoncourt (1943–2008), American museum director, historian of modern art and daughter of Rene
- Franz d'Harnoncourt (born 1937), Austrian jurist, brother of Nikolaus
- Karl d'Harnoncourt (born 1934), Austrian physician, brother of Nikolaus
- Ladislaja d'Harnoncourt (1899–1997), mother of Nikolaus, Philipp, Franz and Karl
- Nikolaus d'Harnoncourt (1929–2016), Austrian conductor, son of Ladislaja
- Philipp d'Harnoncourt (1931–2020), Austrian theologian, brother of Nikolaus
- Rene d'Harnoncourt (1901–1968), Austrian-American museum director
