= Elisabeth von Magnus =

Austrian classical mezzo-soprano (born 1954)

- Born: Elisabeth Juliana de la Fontaine und d'Harnoncourt-Unverzagt; 29 May 1954 (age 71); Vienna, Allied-occupied Austria (now Austria)
- Education: Mozarteum
- Occupation: Classical mezzo-soprano
- Spouses: Ernst-Jürgen von Magnus (m. 1981; div. 1999) Simon Schouten (m. 1999)
- Children: 3
- Parents: Nikolaus Harnoncourt (father); Alice Harnoncourt (mother)

Elisabeth von Magnus (born Countess Elisabeth Juliana de la Fontaine und d'Harnoncourt-Unverzagt on 29 May 1954) is an Austrian classical mezzo-soprano. The daughter of conductor Nikolaus Harnoncourt and violinist Alice Harnoncourt, her professional name derives from her first marriage to Ernst-Jürgen von Magnus. She studied recorder in Vienna, theater at the Mozarteum in Salzburg and voice with Hertha Töpper at the Conservatory of Munich. Her other teachers included Paul Schilhawsky. Early in her career, she performed as a recorder soloist with the Concentus Musicus Wien. She has also worked for ORF as a presenter and announcer.

Von Magnus appeared at the Salzburg Festival first in 1993 in Mozart's Great Mass in C minor as well as in L'incoronazione di Poppea and Vespro della Beata Vergine 1610 of Monteverdi. She took part in several projects with Nikolaus Harnoncourt, such as a production of Mozart's Le nozze di Figaro staged by Jürgen Flimm in Amsterdam. Her US debut in 1991 was in Bach’s St Matthew Passion with the Los Angeles Philharmonic conducted by Peter Schreier.

Her recordings include participation in the complete vocal works of Johann Sebastian Bach with Ton Koopman and the Amsterdam Baroque Orchestra & Choir. She has also appeared in recordings for such labels as Teldec and Deutsche Harmonia Mundi.

Her marriage to Ernst-Jürgen von Magnus, from 1981 to 1999, produced three children, and ended in divorce. In 1999, she married the tenor and choral conductor Simon Schouten. Outside of performance, Elisabeth von Magnus serves as Deputy Vice-Chancellor for Art and International Affairs at the University of Music and Performing Arts, Graz, since the summer of 2012.

== See also ==
- Harnoncourt (family)
