= Franz Harnoncourt =

Austrian jurist and chief executive (born 1937)

- Born: 2 August 1937 (age 89); Graz, Austria
- Other name: Franz Harnoncourt-Unverzagt
- Education: University of Graz
- Occupations: Chief executive officer; Honorary consul
- Organizations: Kastner & Öhler; Grazer Wechselseitige Versicherung; Order of Malta
- Family: Nikolaus Harnoncourt (brother); Philipp Harnoncourt (brother); Karl Harnoncourt (brother)
- Awards: Ehrenzeichen für Verdienste um die Republik Österreich; Ehrenzeichen der Steiermark

Franz Harnoncourt, or Harnoncourt-Unverzagt (born 2 August 1937) is an Austrian jurist, CEO of the Kastner & Öhler department store in Graz, and president and member of the advisory board of the Grazer Wechselseitige Versicherung.

== Life and career ==
Harnoncourt was born in Graz, the seventh child of Eberhard Harnoncourt and his wife Ladislaja, née Countess of Meran. He is a brother of the physician Karl Harnoncourt, the late conductor Nikolaus Harnoncourt and the late theologian Philipp Harnoncourt.

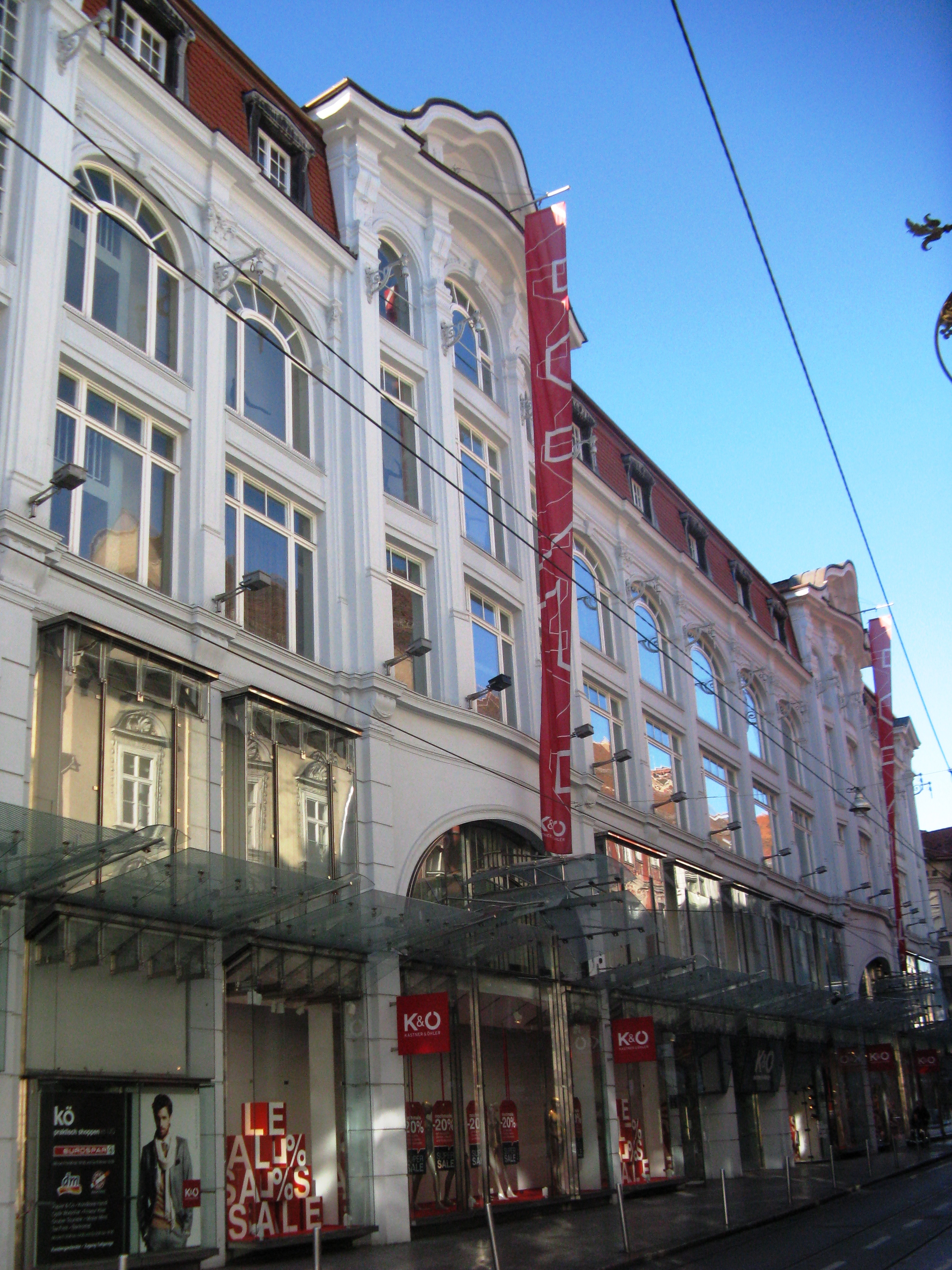
Kastner & Öhler in Graz

He studied law at the University of Graz and promoted to the doctorate. He then began work as a tax advisor for Binder+Co, including two years in the U.S. He then worked in department stores, in Germany for Karstadt, and for Marks & Spencer in the UK. He began at the Kastner & Öhler, including jobs such as sales person and storage worker, and served as CEO for decades. From 1982 to 2012, he was also president and member of the supervisory board of the Grazer Wechselseitige Versicherung insurance company. He has been honorary president since.

Harnoncourt is a knight of the Order of Malta, serving as Rezeptor of Austria. He represents Luxembourg as honorary consul. Harnoncourt is also president of the Graz Musikverein, supporting concerts of classical music.

Franz Harnoncourt and Marion née Fogarassy (born 1941), the daughter of Viktor Fogarassy and Dollie Kastner, married in 1965. The couple has five daughters and a son.

They supported the project initiated by his brother Philipp to restore the Heiligen-Geist-Kapelle, Bruck in Bruck, and he and his wife attended the opening celebration on 7 June 2020.

== Awards ==
- 1999: Großes Goldenes Ehrenzeichen für Verdienste um die Republik Österreich (Grand Decoration of Honour in Gold for Services to the Republic of Austria)
- 2007: Ehrenzeichen des Landes Steiermark
- 2012: Großes Goldenes Ehrenzeichen mit dem Stern für Verdienste um die Republik Österreich (Grand Decoration of Honour in Gold with Star)
- 2012: Bürger der Stadt Graz
