= Fogarasi =

Fogarasi or Fogarassy is a Hungarian surname that may refer to

- Alabert Fogarasi (1891–1959), Hungarian philosopher and politician
- János Fogarasi (1801–1878), Hungarian jurist and philologist
- Viktor Fogarassy (1911–1989), Austrian merchant and art collector
