= Philipp Harnoncourt =

Austrian theologian, priest, and musician

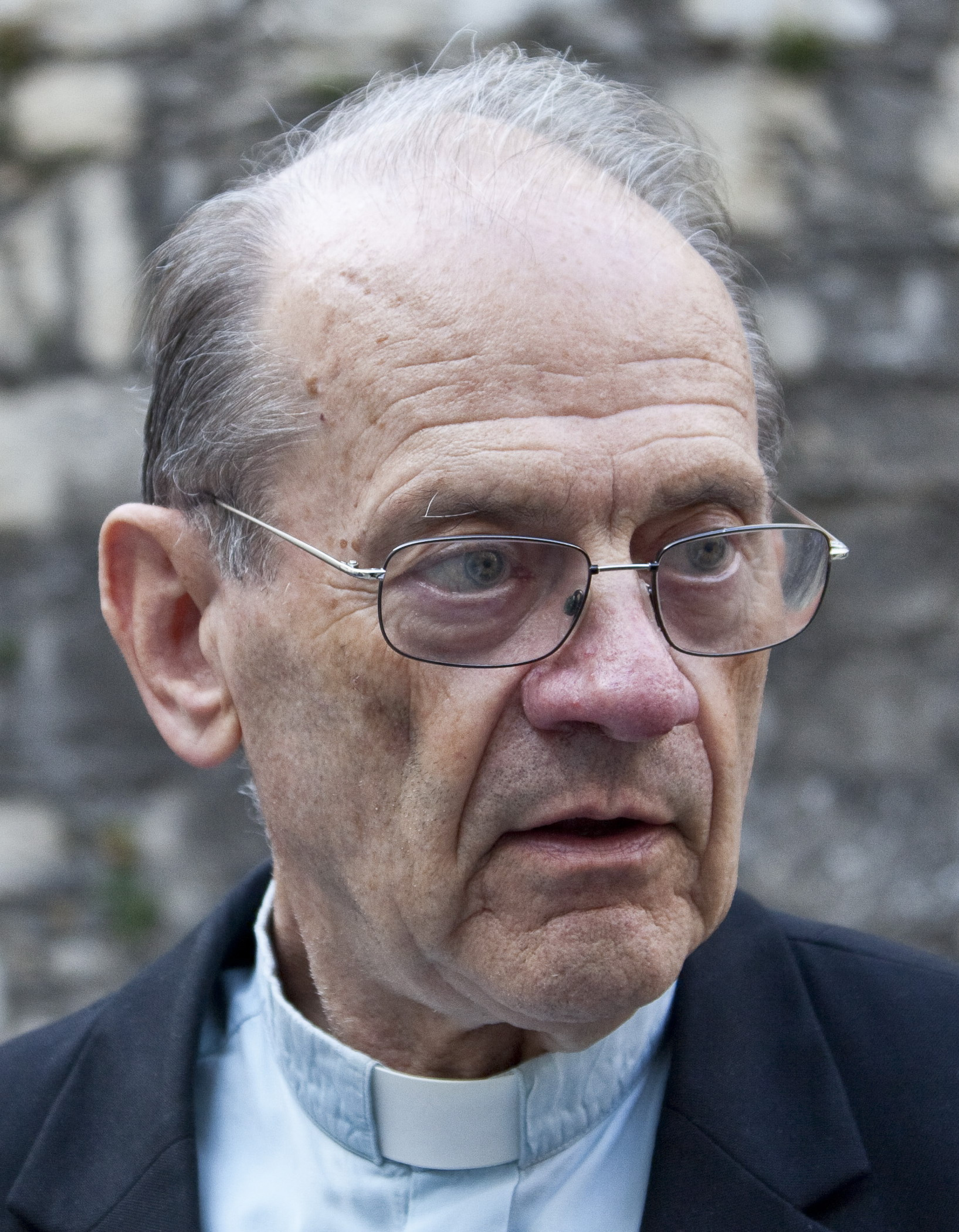
- Philipp Harnoncourt in 2009
- Born: 9 February 1931; Berlin, Germany
- Died: 25 May 2020 (aged 89); Grundlsee, Austria
- Other name: Philipp de la Fontaine und d'Harnoncourt-Unverzagt (nobility historically)
- Education: University of Graz; Georgianum; Ludwig-Maximilians-Universität München
- Occupations: Catholic priest; Academic teacher; Musician
- Organizations: Kunstuniversität Graz; University of Graz; Pro Oriente
- Parent: Ladislaja Harnoncourt
- Family: Nikolaus Harnoncourt (brother); Franz Harnoncourt (brother); Karl Harnoncourt (brother)
- Awards: Austrian Decoration for Science and Art; Ehrenzeichen of Steiermark

Signature
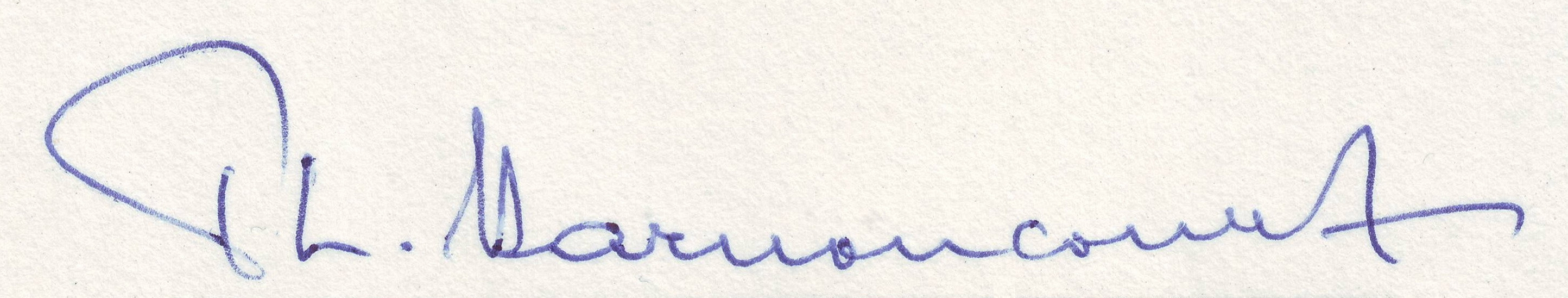

Philipp Harnoncourt or Philipp Graf de la Fontaine und d'Harnoncourt-Unverzagt (9 February 1931 – 25 May 2020) was an Austrian theologian, priest and musician. Born into a noble family, he grew up in Graz and decided to become a priest at age 17. He studied at the University of Graz and the Ludwig-Maximilians-Universität München. In 1963, he founded a department of church music at the later Kunstuniversität Graz. He was appointed professor at the University of Graz in 1972 and was head of the institute of liturgics, Christian art and hymnology until his retirement in 1999.

Inspired by the Second Vatican Council, he contributed to the first common Catholic hymnal in German, Gotteslob, and supported ecumenism especially with Orthodox Churches, as a member of the board of Pro Oriente from 1986. He focused on the Trinity, founded the art prize 1+1+1=1 for new works related to the concept, and initiated the restoration of a chapel first dedicated to the Trinity.

== Life ==
Philipp Harnoncourt was born in Berlin on 9 February 1931, into nobility, the son of Eberhard Harnoncourt (1896–1970) and Ladislaja Johanna Franziska née Gräfin von Meran, Freiin von Brandhoven. He moved with his family to Graz in 1931, living in the family residence Palais Meran. With his brother Nikolaus, he played piano four-hands as a little boy. Both were altar servers at the Graz Cathedral and were thus exposed to church music. When bombing became a threat at the end of 1944, the family moved to Grundlsee.

After World War II, they returned to Graz and Philipp decided to become a priest at age 17. He studied theology at the University of Graz and at the Ludwig-Maximilians-Universität München where he was influenced especially by Romano Guardini, and after finishing his studies, he was ordained as a priest on 11 July 1954. After years as a chaplain in Arnfels and Hartberg, he became secretary of the bishop of Graz, Josef Schoiswohl, in 1959.

In 1963, Harnoncourt founded a department for church music which became later part of the Kunstuniversität Graz. He was its director for nine years. He was appointed professor at the University of Graz in 1972, and served until his retirement in 1999 as head of the institute of liturgics, Christian art and hymnology. In 1975 and 1976, he was also dean of the theological faculty of the Graz University.

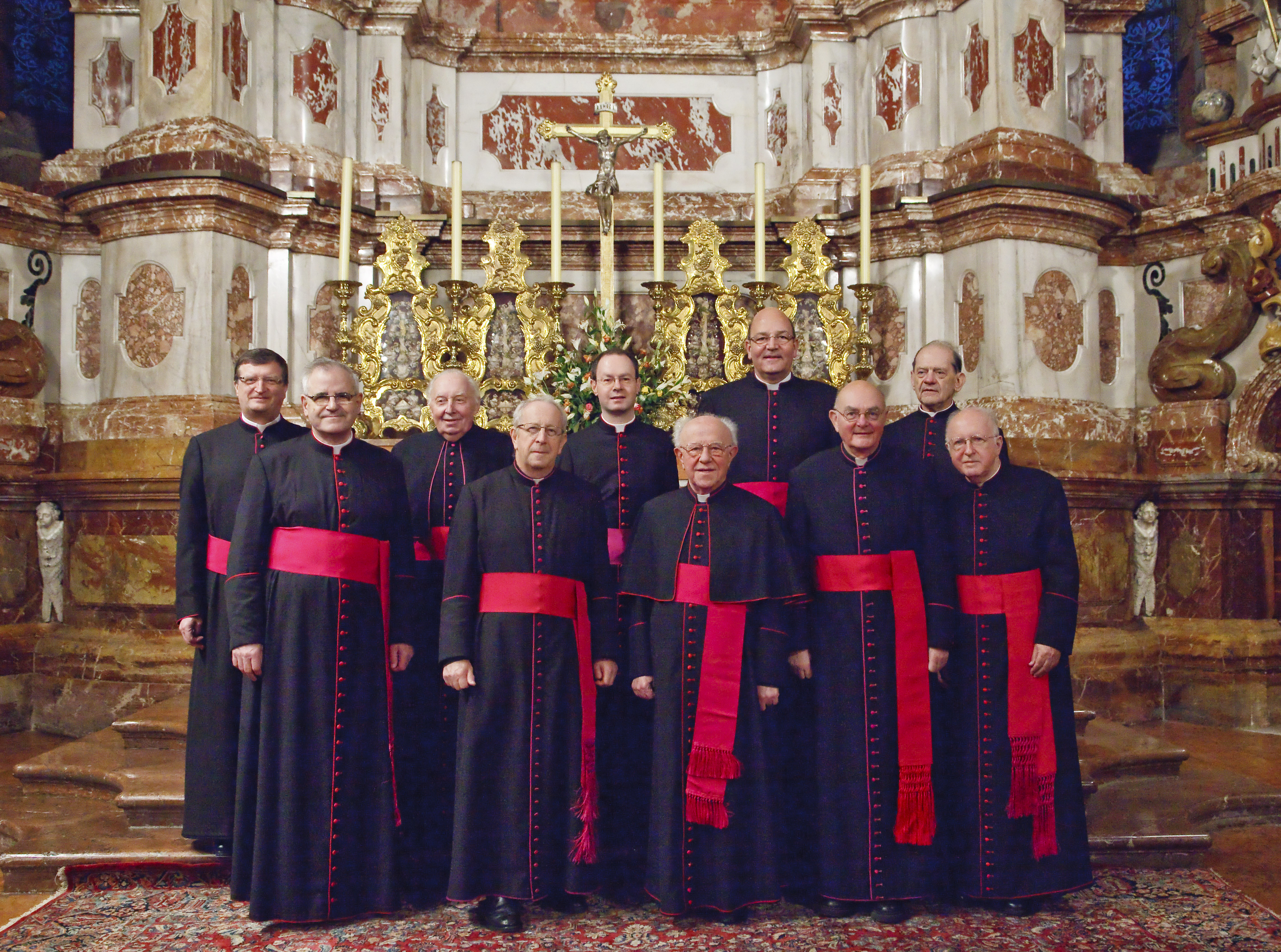
The Graz Cathedral Chapter in 2010, with Harnoncourt 2nd row, right

Harnoncourt is regarded as an influential liturgist after the Second Vatican Council. He promoted the changes in the liturgy, in theological reflection of services, and a strong ecumenical approach. He contributed to the first common Catholic hymnal in German, Gotteslob, which appeared in 1975, and published over 500 works.

Harnoncourt was also instrumental in the ecumenism of Catholics and the orthodox churches. He worked in the Graz section of Pro Oriente until his death, and was its honorary president. He was awarded an honorary doctorate in Orthodox Theology from the Lucian Blaga University of Sibiu in Romania in 1997. Harnoncourt developed a system of evaluating new church buildings and restoration of churches, called "Steirisches Modell", which is unique to Austria.

=== Harnoncourt's interest in the Trinity ===
Harnoncourt was focused on the Trinity. Feeling that religious beliefs can be expressed better in art than in words, he created an art prize on the occasion of his 80th birthday. Named 1+1+1=1, it has been awarded for new works in the visual arts, literature and music focused on the Trinity. In response, Bertl Muetter composed 1+1+1=1 (discursus trinitatis) for three groups of musicians, which premiered in 2011 at the Graz Cathedral and was dedicated to Harnoncourt. Harnoncourt co-edited and published a book of collected reflections in 2011.

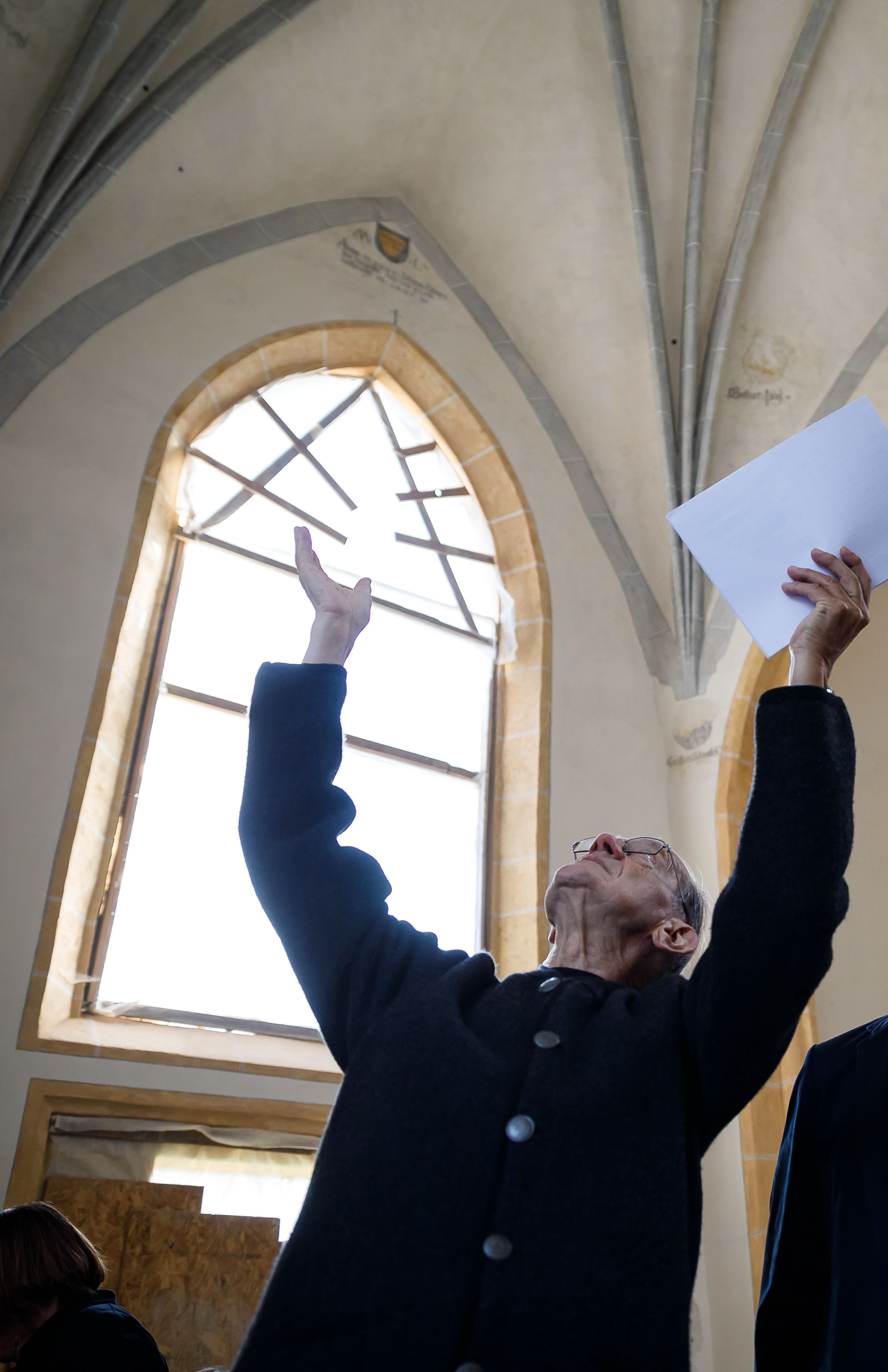
Harnoncourt in the Chapel in 2017

In 2011 he founded, supported by his five siblings, an association to rescue and restore a chapel, the late-Gothic Heiligen-Geist-Kapelle in Bruck an der Mur. The building was originally dedicated to the Trinity and has an unusual triangular floor plan. It was desecrated in 1794, and after that it deteriorated. He said:

There is no such building anywhere in Europe, perhaps not even in the whole world. ... In the Middle Ages, plague, famine and war were considered a deadly trinity of evil that could only be overcome by invoking the Trinity of God. In times of need, vows were made. The citizens of Bruck built this chapel after the end of such plagues as a thanksgiving and memorial for the people. Today, the deadly plagues for the whole earth are the wanton destruction of soil, water and air - gifts that the Creator has entrusted to mankind for preservation. In the future, this building will be a strong memorial reminding us of our obligation to protect the environment. (Note: "Einen solchen Bau gibt es nirgends in Europa, vielleicht sogar in der ganzen Welt nicht. ... Im Mittelalter galten Pest, Hunger und Krieg als tödliche Trinität des Bösen, die nur durch die Anrufung der Trinität Gottes zu überwinden waren. In Notzeiten wurden Gelöbnisse abgelegt. Die Bürger von Bruck haben diese Kapelle nach dem Ende solcher Plagen als Dank- und Mahnmal für die Bevölkerung gebaut. Heute sind die tödlichen Plagen für die ganze Erde die mutwillige Zerstörung von Boden, Wasser und Luft – Gaben, die der Schöpfer den Menschen zur Bewahrung anvertraut hat. Dieser Bau soll künftig ein starkes Mahnmal sein, das an die Verpflichtung zum Schutz der Umwelt erinnert.")

The restored building was inaugurated on 7 June 2020, Trinity Sunday that year, Harnoncourt had hoped to have the Chapel completed by that day.

== Death and burial ==
Harnoncourt died on 25 May 2020 in Grundlsee. The Requiem was held in the garden of House Meran there, led by Matthias Keil, a relative. Among the guests were Franz Lackner, the arch-bishop of Salzburg, and Wilhelm Krautwaschl, bishop of Graz-Seckau The motto was taken from a letter by a Romanian professor; she had written "Ich kann nicht trauern, weil ich so dankbar bin." (I can not mourn because I am so grateful.") Harnoncourt was buried in Grundlsee in the grave of Albrecht of Meran, his great-uncle.

== Awards ==
- 1997 Honorary doctorate of the Lucian Blaga University of Sibiu
- 1997 Domkapitular of the cathedral chapter of the Graz Cathedral
- Austrian Decoration for Science and Art
- Ehrenzeichen des Landes Steiermark

== Composition ==
- Gotteslob No. 38.1: "Der Herr ist mein Licht und mein Heil" to Psalm 27

== Publications ==
- Die Kirchenmusik und das II. Vatikanische Konzil, Styria 1965
- Katechese und Liturgie, Styria 1965, ISBN 978-3-16-155393-6
- Gesamtkirchliche und teilkirchliche Liturgie, Herder Verlag 1974, ISBN 978-3-451-16742-3
- with Walter Brunner, Erich Renhart: Steirische Kalvarienberge, Andreas Schnider Verlags-Atelier 1990, ISBN 978-3-900993-02-3
- with Angelus Häußling OSB, Klemens Richter, Philipp Schäfer, Richard Schaeffler, Clemens Thoma: Vom Sinn der Liturgie, Patmos 1991, ISBN 978-3-491-77387-5
- Funktion und Zeichen. Kirchenbau in der Steiermark seit dem II. Vatikanum, Andreas Schnider Verlags-Atelier 1992, ISBN 978-3-900993-14-6
- Liturgie der Kirche, ein gesamtkirchliches und ein ortskirchliches Geschehen, Graz 1993
- with Maximilian Liebmann: Theologien im Dialog: gemeinsame Verantwortung – gemeinsame Aufgaben im südosteuropäischen Raum. Begegnung Jüdischer, Christlicher und Islamischer Theologischer Fakultäten und Hochschulen aus dem Südosteuropäischen Raum, Inst. für Ökumenische Theologie und Patrologie Graz 1994, ISBN 978-3-900797-17-1
- Heilige als Brückenbauer: Heiligenverehrung im ökumenischen Dialog, EOS Verlag 1997, ISBN 978-3-88096-778-6
- Kostbar ist der Tag, Manumedia Schnider Verlag 2000, ISBN 978-3-902020-08-6
- Gott feiern in versöhnter Verschiedenheit: Aufsätze zur Liturgie, zur Spiritualität und zur Ökumene, Herder 2005, ISBN 978-3-451-28924-8
- with Birgit Pölzl, Johannes Rauchenberger: 1+1+1=1 Trinität, Edition Korrespondenzen 2011, ISBN 978-3-902113-88-7
