= Heiligen-Geist-Kapelle, Bruck =

Chapel in Bruck an der Mur, Styria, Austria

Heiligen-Geist-Kapelle
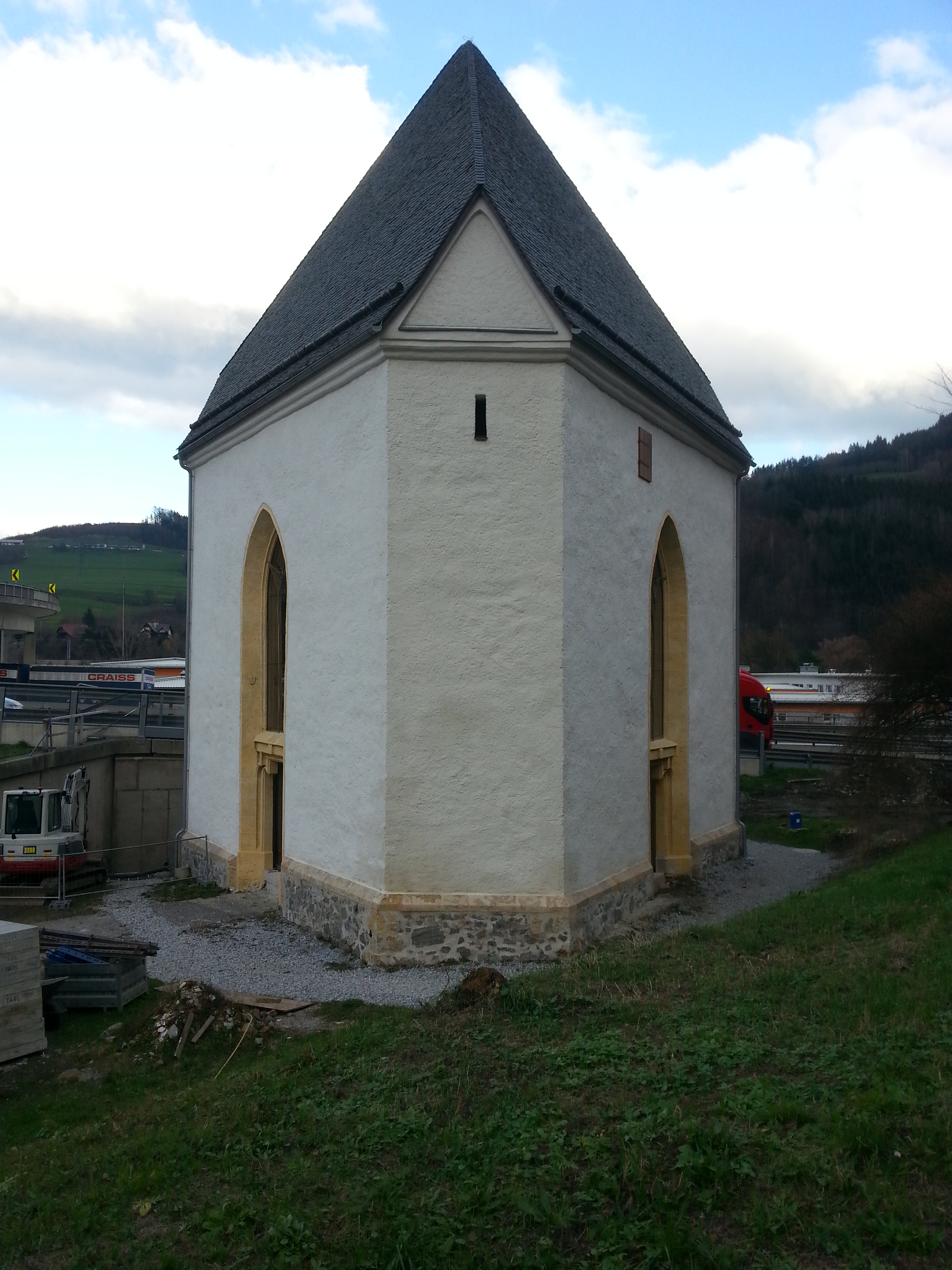
- Exterior in 2018
- Interactive map of Heiligen-Geist-Kapelle

General information
- Status: Monument
- Location: Bruck an der Mur, Styria, Austria
- Coordinates: 47.4053°N 15.2835°E
- Groundbreaking: 1495
- Opened: 1497
- Renovated: 2011

Website
- www.bruckmur.at

The Heiligen-Geist-Kapelle in Bruck an der Mur, Styria, Austria, is a chapel named for the Holy Spirit. It was built in late-Gothic style, originally dedicated to the Trinity, which explains its unusual triangular floorplan, with three similar walls, all with a portal. The building fell into disrepair in the 18th century and was used for several purposes such as a postmaster's stable, an inn and for housing, which changed the interior. Initiated by Philipp Harnoncourt in 2011, the building was restored to its original appearance, with new features where no trace of the original could be found. It is a unique listed historic monument of more than regional importance.

== History ==
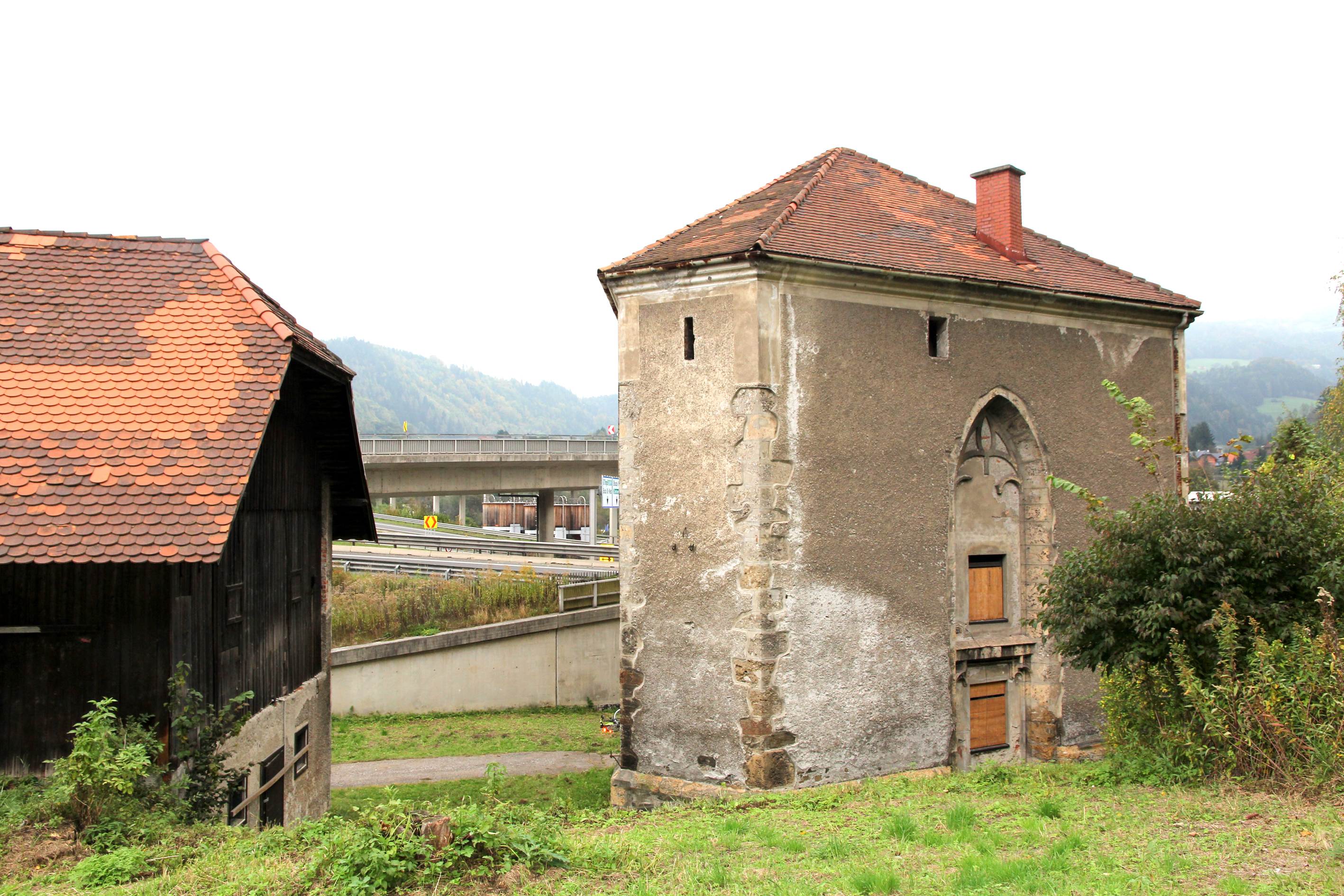
View from southwest in 2012

The chapel was built in the 15th century, replacing a chapel from 1422 that belonged to a Pestspital, a hospital for patients with the plague. That building was badly damaged during the invasion by Turks in 1480. Four wealthy citizens including the Kornmesser, Pögl and Holzapfel families financed a new building. It was erected from 1495 to 1497 as a monument of thanks for the survival of plague, hunger and war. The donors were merchants who contributed to the flourishing of Bruck, located where important roads of the day met. Further donors whose names are mentioned in wall decoration belong to a younger generation. One inscription, dated 1504, mentions figura aura, the golden ratio which governs the proportions of the building. Protocols dated from the 1540s confirm that the building was used for church services as a filial church of Bruck. In a protocol of 1617, Bishop Jakob Eberlein noted the triangular floor as unusual and demanded that the altars be returned to the apses, to concur with the intentions of the first builders, and to ease listening to masses from outside.

Services were held in the chapel until 1783. When no longer used, the building fell into disrepair. In 1794, the Catholic Church conducted a ceremony of deconsecration of the chapel. It was then used by the postmaster Ignaz Weigel as a stable and hay storage for the carriage horses. In 1817, Franz Oberländer received permission to remodel the building as a guest house, called Geistwirt. Further restructuring happened in 1921, destroying the Gothic windows. The town of Bruck acquired the building in 1955 and used it as housing for its personnel. For this purpose the interior was divided, with two upper floors with several rooms each. When a nearby highway was expanded there were plans to demolish the chapel. It was prevented, but living so close to major traffic became unbearable, and the building remained empty from 1999.

The building was recognised as unusual in the 19th century, by publication of the floor plan and images of the vault. Johann Graus requested restoration in 1882.

Two doctoral theses focused on the building, in 1999 and 2000. Related to these works, the art historian Mario Schwarz pointed out the sad state of this unique Gothic monument. Philipp Harnoncourt, who was interested in the arts focused on the Trinity, decided in 2011 to work towards the restoration. He first convinced his six siblings including Nikolaus Harnoncourt and Franz Harnoncourt, and then the government of Bruck, to support the plan to restore the building, to serve as a monument for the protection of the environment. On June 7, 2020, Trinity Sunday, as Philipp Harnoncourt had wished, the completion of the restoration of the Holy Spirit Chapel in Bruck an der Mur was celebrated with a ceremony - just a few days after his death and one day after his funeral in Grundlsee. The celebration during the COVID-19 pandemic was presented per livestream by the town of Bruck.

== Architecture and restoration ==
The chapel is unique in the late-Gothic architecture of Austria. The donors were free from the restrictions of conventional church building. The ground plan of equilateral triangle with bevelled corners is a symbol of the Trinity. Inside, the corners house three equal apses, making it an equilateral hexagon floor, which is crowned by a three-fold star rib vault. The building's proportions follow the aurea figura, the golden ratio. The three facades are equally prominent, all with a portal and a window above it.

The restoration of the original appearance was possible, because exterior and interior features were preserved, at least on one side, and could be reconstructed knowing of the symmetry. Surviving interior decoration was rediscovered in 2013, included red chalk graphics with remains of the Stiftungsinschrift (foundation inscription) of 1497, which names Bruck citizens and shows their coats of arms: Pankraz Kornmess, Michael Holzapfel, Leonhard Schierling and Albrecht Dyem. The building was restored as close as possible to its original character, in collaboration with the Österreichisches Bundesdenkmalamt. For missing elements, such as a floor, the windows and lighting, an architecture competition was held to include contemporary art.

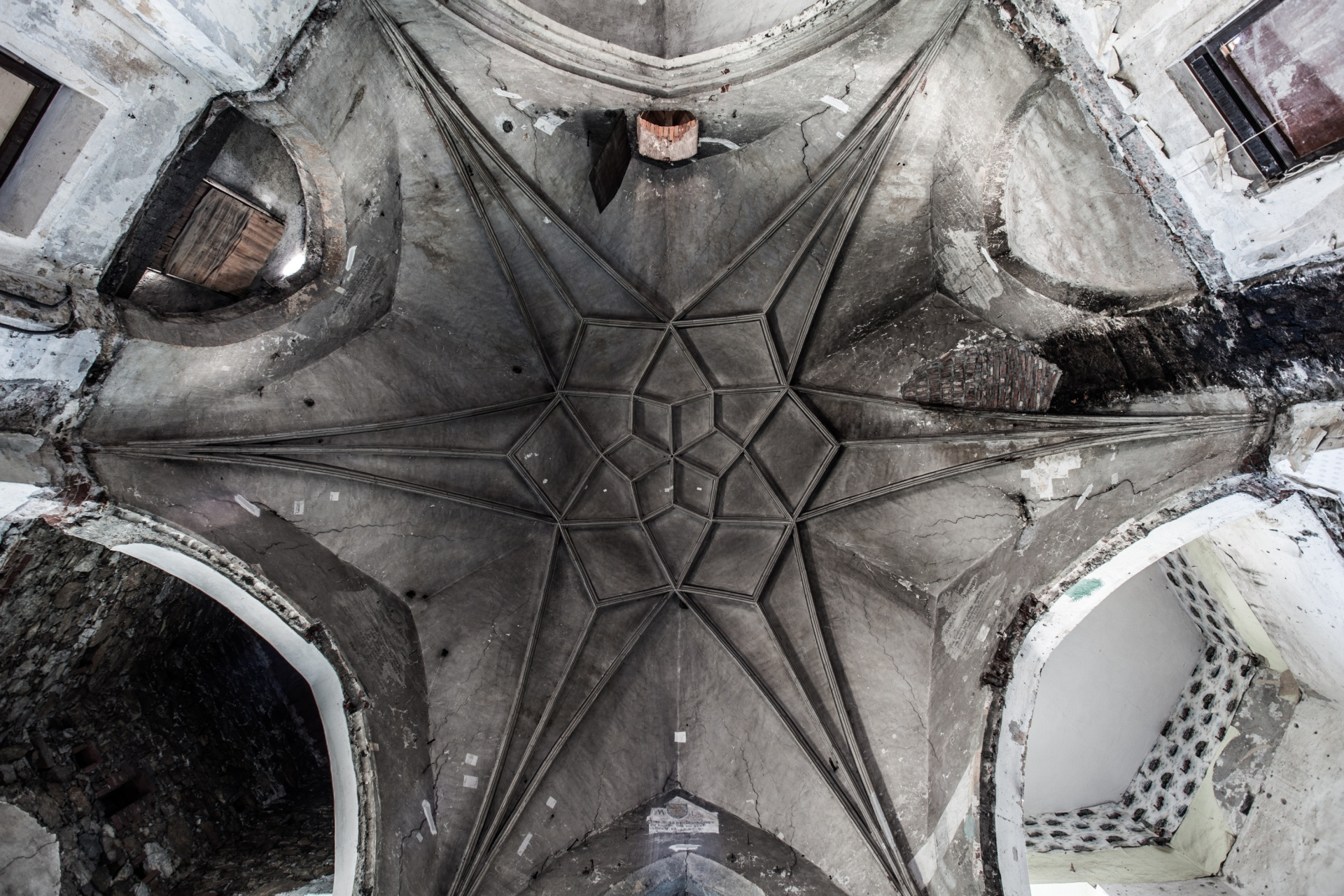
Star rib vault in 2014, before restoration

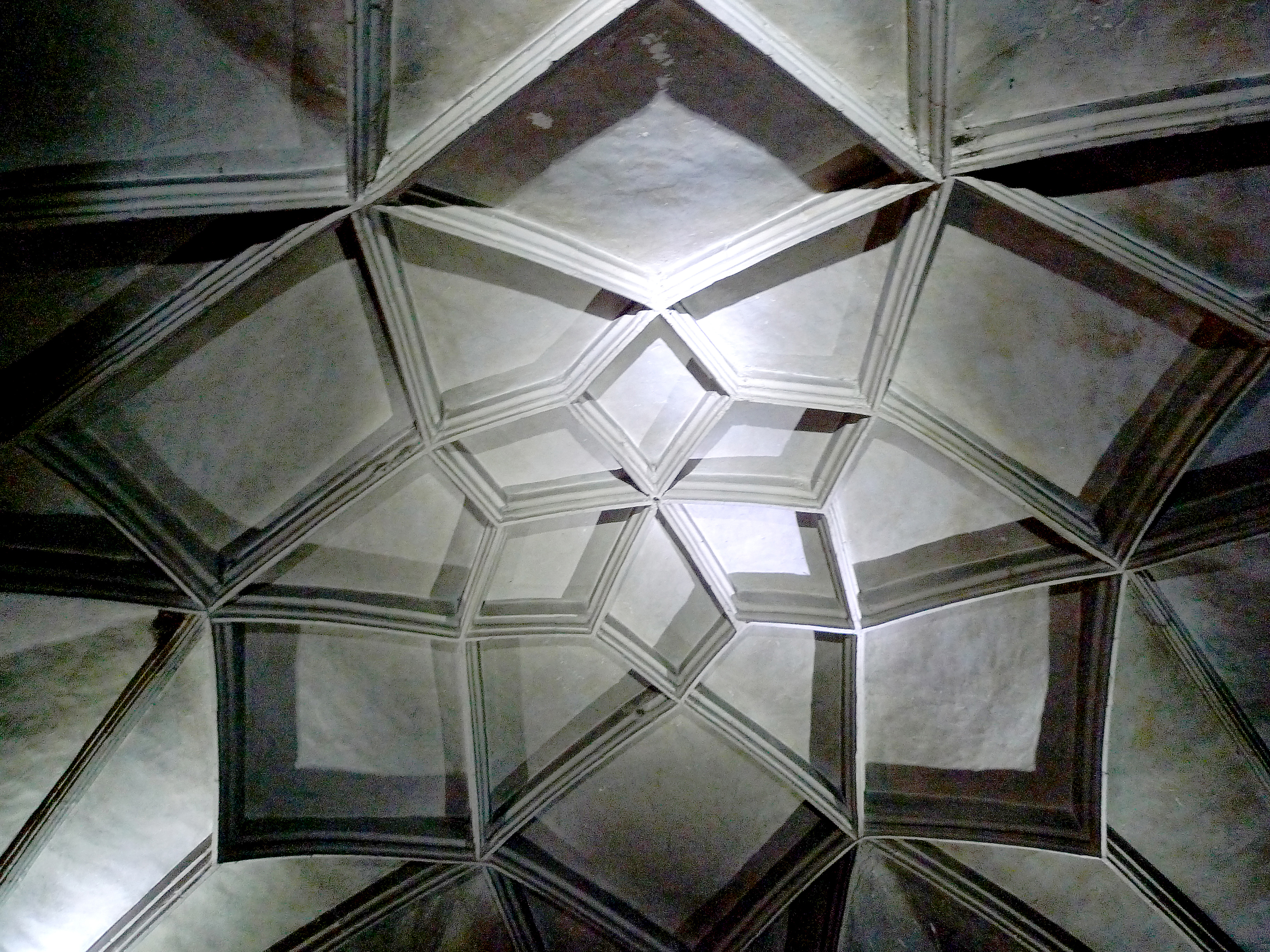
Star rib vault detail

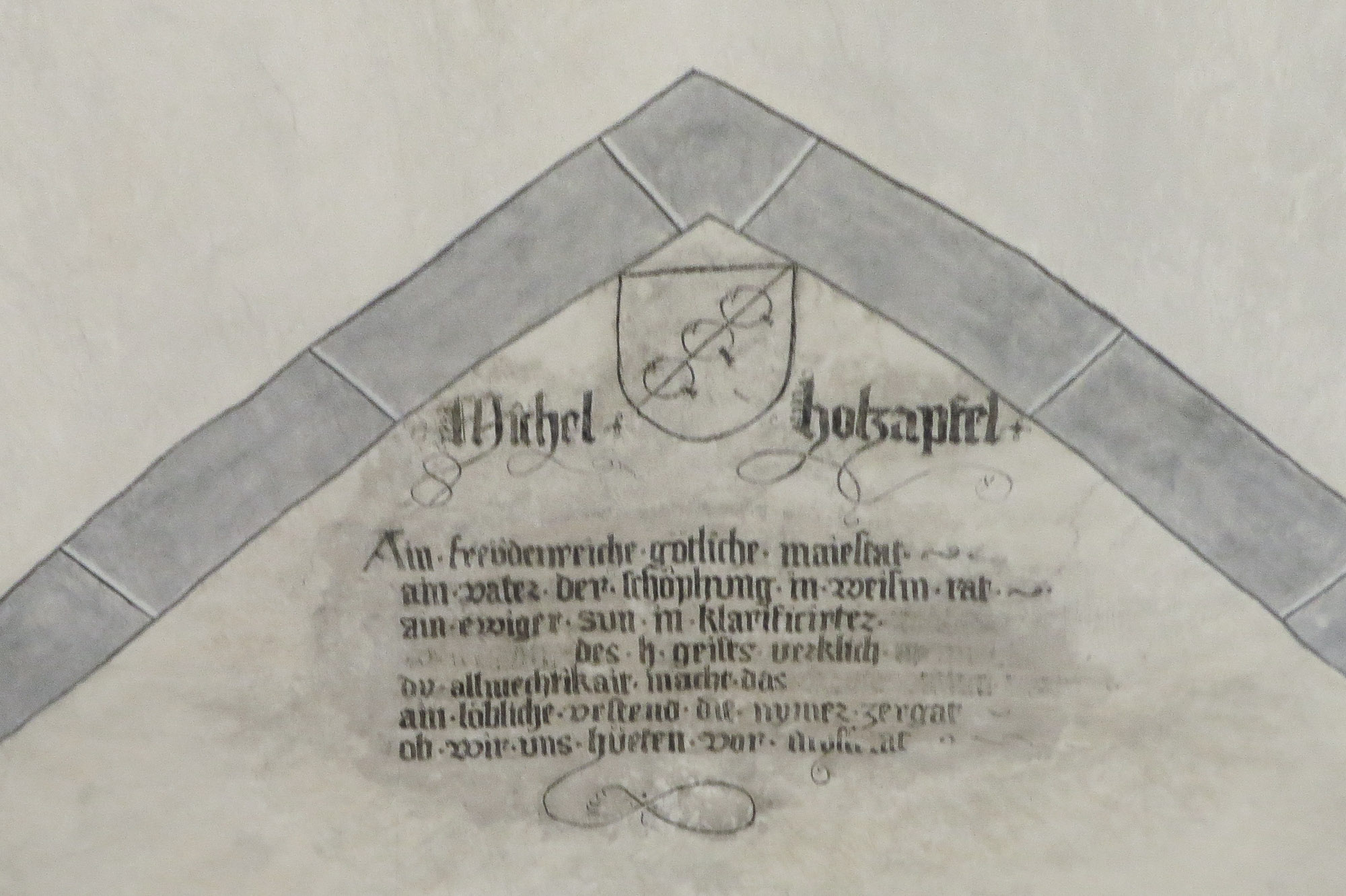
Inscription and coat of arms of a donor, red chalk

=== Timeline ===
The project developed in stages:

- 2012: Founding of the association "Förderung zur Wiederherstellung der Heiligen-Geist-Kapelle" (Support of the restoration of the HGK)
- 2013: Gutting of the interior
- 2014: Architecture competition
- 2014: Restoration of the original roof
- 2015: Restoration of the facade, demolishing the stable building
- 2016: Restoration of the interior
- 2017: Discovery of the frescoes, restoration of the interior walls
- 2018: Windows and portals
- 2020: Completion
