= Ladislaja Harnoncourt =

Member of the Austrian Harnoncourt family

- Born: Ladislaja Johanna Franziska Gräfin von Meran; 8 October 1899; Schloss Stainz, Styria, Austria-Hungary
- Died: 22 July 1997 (aged 97); Graz, Styria, Austria
- Children: Nikolaus Harnoncourt; Philipp Harnoncourt; Karl Harnoncourt; Franz Harnoncourt
- Family: Franz, Count of Meran (grandfather)

Ladislaja Harnoncourt, née Gräfin von Meran, Freiin von Brandhoven (8 October 1899 – 22 July 1997) was a member of the Austrian Harnoncourt family. She raised seven children, two of them from her husband's first marriage, including the conductor and pioneer of historically informed performance, Nikolaus Harnoncourt, and the priest and patron of the arts Philipp Harnoncourt.

== Life ==
Ladislaja Johanna Franziska Gräfin von Meran, Freiin von Brandhoven, was born in 1899. She was the great-granddaughter of the Habsburg Archduke Johann, the 13th child of Emperor Leopold II, a descendant of various Holy Roman Emperors and other European royalty. Her grandfather was Franz, Count of Meran, who bought Schloss Stainz, a former monastery in Styria, where she was born. Her father was his son, Johann Stephan von Meran, and her mother Ladislaja Maria Karoline Franziska Therese Gräfin von Lamberg. As a girl, she was regarded as ineducable, and was nicknamed "Die wilde Laja" (The wild Laja). She was a good dancer and singer. She was engaged to a Hungarian baron, who died. She then decided to remain single and work as a nurse.

Her future husband, Eberhard Harnoncourt (1896–1970), born Graf de la Fontaine und d'Harnoncourt-Unverzagt, was an Austrian engineer working in Berlin. He was a widower with two small children, Alice and Renatus (René). He thought of Ladislaja as a possible mother for his children, and asked permission from her mother to meet her. He travelled to Austria for the meeting in October 1928, and they were married on 29 December that year in the bishop's chapel in Graz. Their son Nikolaus was born in 1929, his brother Philipp two years later. In 1931, her husband's company went bankrupt. The family moved to Graz where he obtained a post in the state government (Landesregierung) of Styria. Their children Juliana, Karl and Franz were born there. She and her husband brought the children up to be alert and generous-spirited. The family also spent time in Grundlsee and the Brandhof estate.

Nikolaus Harnoncourt became a cellist, conductor and pioneer of historically informed performance, Philipp Harnoncourt was a priest and patron of the arts, Karl Harnoncourt a physician, and Franz Harnoncourt CEO of the warehouse Kastner & Öhler. Nikolaus Harnoncourt wrote a memoir of the family from the 13th century to the early 1950s, which his wife Alice published after his death. It covers details of his mother's life, some narrated by herself.

Ladislaja Harnoncourt died in Graz at the age of 97.
