= Karl Harnoncourt =

- Born: 12 August 1934 (age 91); Graz, Styria, Austria
- Other names: Karl de la Fontaine und d'Harnoncourt-Unverzagt (nobility historically)
- Education: University of Graz
- Occupations: Physician; Academic teacher
- Organizations: Joanneum; Steiermärkische Krankenanstaltengesellschaft; Hospizverein Steiermark
- Parent: Ladislaja Harnoncourt
- Family: Nikolaus Harnoncourt (brother); Philipp Harnoncourt (brother); Franz Harnoncourt (brother)
- Awards: Ehrenzeichen of Steiermark

Karl Harnoncourt (born 12 August 1934) is an Austrian physician and academic teacher.

== Life ==
Harnoncourt was born into nobility in Graz, the son of Eberhard Harnoncourt (1896–1970) and Ladislaja Johanna Franziska née Gräfin von Meran, Freiin von Brandhoven. He studied medicine at the University of Graz and was promoted to Ph.D. in 1958. He specialised as an internist at the Landeskrankenhaus (LKH) in Graz, and was habilitated in 1973. He headed a department of the LKH from 1977 to 1999. From 1989, he was president of the institute for preventive medicine of the Joanneum, and from 1989 to 1991 president of the Österreichische Gesellschaft für Pneumologie. He served from 1993 as president of the Landessanitätsrats Steiermark, and from 1995 as director of the Steiermärkische Krankenanstaltengesellschaft (KAGes).

He was influential in the manufacturing of instruments for arterial blood gas test which were made in the 1960s by AVL based on his research. He introduced ultrasonic examinations as the basis for spirometry, and initiated the building of a university clinic for psychosomatic and psychotherapy in Bad Aussee.

From 2003 to 2012, Harnoncourt was Obmann of the Hospizverein Steiermark.

== Family ==
Harnoncourt is married; the couple has two sons and three daughters. He is a brother of the conductor Nikolaus Harnoncourt, the theologian Philipp Harnoncourt and the business ececutive Franz Harnoncourt. His daughter was married to American gallery owner Richard L. Feigen.

== Awards ==
- 2013: Ehrenzeichen des Landes Steiermark
