= Viktor Fogarassy =

Austrian art collector and merchant

- Viktor Fogarassy, by Joseph Pillhofer, 1976
- Born: 6 May 1911; Preßburg, Austria-Hungary
- Died: 24 March 1989 (aged 77); Graz, Austria
- Occupations: Merchant; Managing partner; Art collector
- Organizations: Kastner & Öhler; Rotary Club Graz; Joanneum

Viktor Fogarassy (6 May 1911 – 24 March 1989) was an Austrian merchant, managing partner of the Kastner & Öhler department stores, and an art collector, especially of works by Egon Schiele. The state of Styria named a prize for the support of contemporary art after him, the Viktor-Fogarassy-Preis.

== Life ==
Fogarassy was born in Preßburg (today: Bratislava) on 6 May 1911. The family had earned nobility in the 17th century, fighting the Ottoman invasion. He grew up in Hungary and then in Vienna, where he completed school with the Matura in 1930.

Fogarassy was married to Dollie Kastner, a granddaughter of Carl Kastner, a co-founder of the Graz department store Kastner & Öhler, and his wife Julie who was Jewish. In 1938, the directors of the department store decided to sell their shares to their "Aryan" sons-in-law to prevent a confiscation by the Nazi regime. Fogarassy became the manager of their Agram operations in Croatia. When these were confiscated by communists in 1946, he moved back to Graz, where he became managing partner (Geschäftsführender Gesellschafter) in 1948. He remained in the position until his retirement in March 1977 when he was succeeded by his son-in-law Franz Harnoncourt.

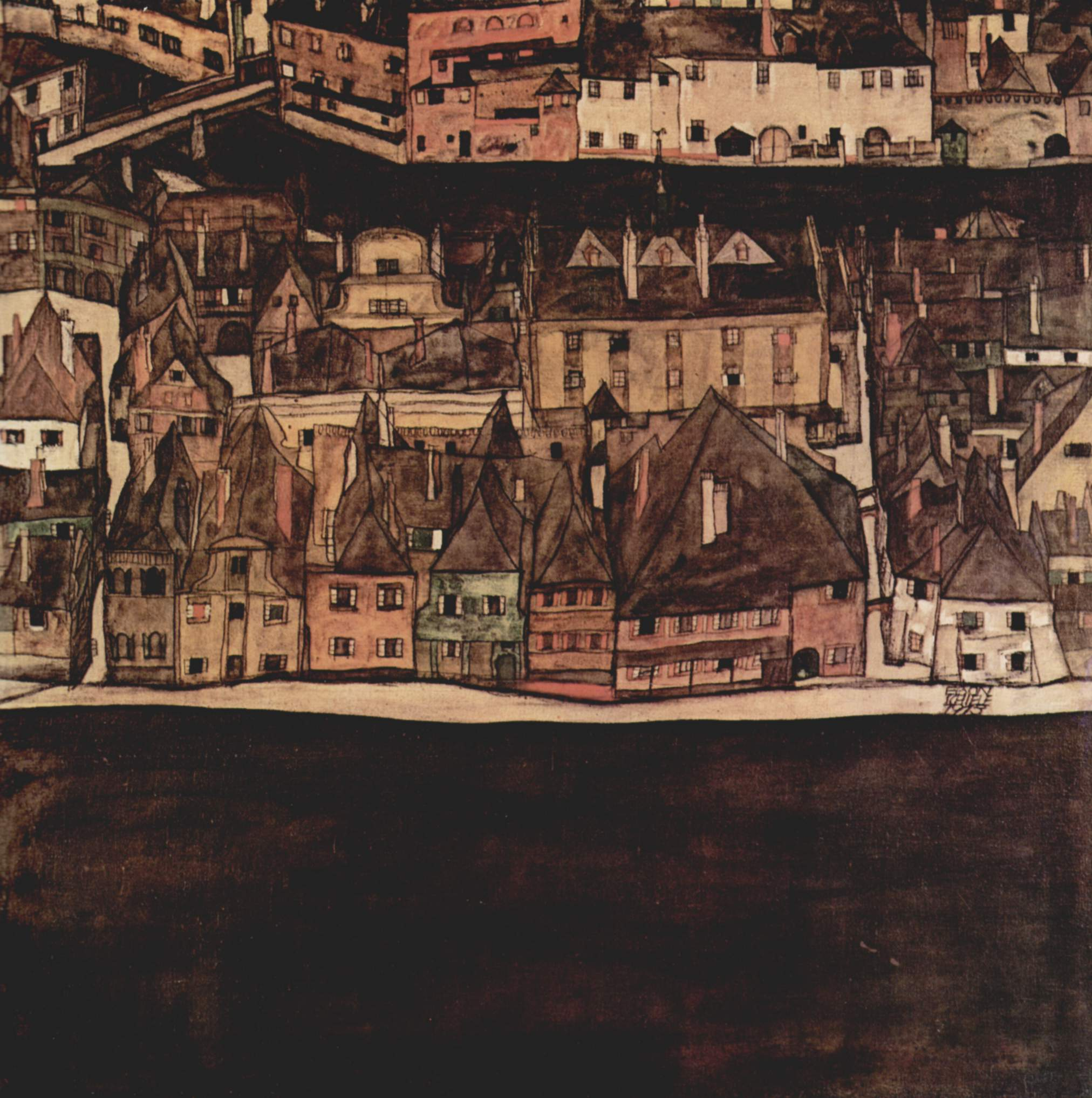
Kleine Stadt by Schiele

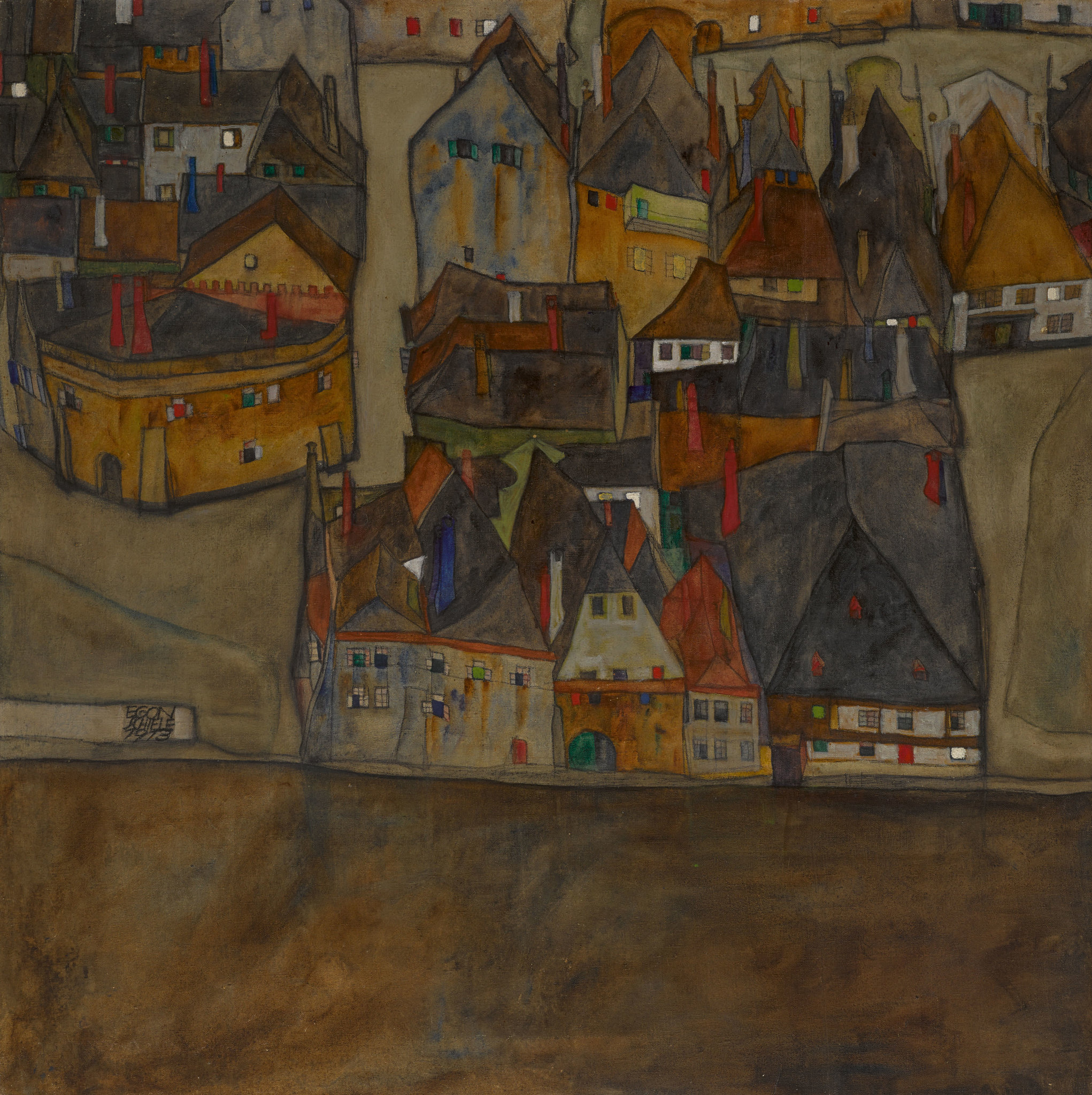
Dämmernde Stadt by Schiele

Fogarassy was one of the important art collectors in Austria after World War II. His nephew reported that he acquired prints by Egon Schiele before his Matura. According to the American art historian Alessandra Comini, he began collecting works by Schiele before 1938. From the 1950s, he bought mostly at the Galerie Würthle. The gallery later sold parts of his legacy. He was a member of the Kuratorium (board of trustees) of the Joanneum, the museum of the province of Styria, in Graz. He was a member of the Rotary Club in Graz from 1968, and served as its president in 1979 and 1980.

He died in Graz on 24 March 1989. The Requiem was held at the Graz Cathedral on 31 March 1989.

== Legacy ==
The sculptor Josef Pillhofer made a bronze portrait head of Fogarassy in 1976, which was displayed in an exhibition of his heads at the Belvedere in Vienna in 2002.

The state of Styria founded a prize for the support of contemporary art (Förderungspreis des Landes Steiermark für Zeitgenössische Bildende Kunst) in his name, the Viktor-Fogarassy-Preis. A related exhibition has been held at the Neue Galerie of the Joanneum.

In 2018, in an act of private restitution, his family agreed to auction a painting, Schiele's Dämmernde Stadt (City in Twilight or The Small City II), that he had acquired in good faith, sharing the proceeds with the descendants of the former Jewish owner.
