= Nama (department store) =

Chain of department stores in Slovenia

Coordinates: 46°3′8.6″N 14°30′11.56″E

Nama, or NAMA, is the acronym for Narodni magazin 'national store'. This was a chain of department stores in the former SFRY (Yugoslavia) and the first Slovenian department store. Nama owns three stores in Slovenia today:

- At 1 Tomšič Street (Slovene: Tomšičeva ulica 1) in Ljubljana. The main facade fronts Slovenian Street (Slovene: Slovenska cesta), across from the Central Post Office.
- G-Star Raw store in the BTC City (Citypark), Ljubljana
- At 14 Capuchin Square (Kapucinski trg 14) in Škofja Loka (facing the main bus station).

In the past, stores also existed in Žalec, Kočevje, Slovenj Gradec, Ravne na Koroškem, Cerkno and Velenje.

== Bata Palace ==
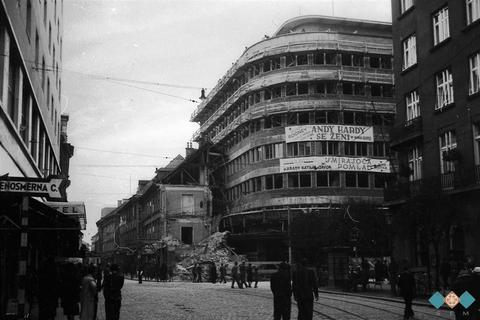
Bata Palace, 1940, photographed by Peter Naglič

The seven-storey original building of the NAMA store in Ljubljana, originally known as "Service Hall" (Dom službe), was completed in 1939 upon plans by the architect Franjo Lušičić. It was built in the modern style by the construction company owned by Josip Dedek. In 1965, a new building, work by the architects Bogdan Fink and Miloš Lapajne, was added to it at its southern side. In 2002, at the restoration, its facade was redesigned in glass, despite the opposition of the original authors.

== Nama in Croatia ==
Another successor of NAMA in SFRJ is the Croatian company with the same name^{(in Croatian)}, formed by nationalization of Kastner & Öhler in 1945.

The company in Croatia today runs two stores, including the one bought by Kastner & Öhler in 1889.
