= Szyszkowitz + Kowalski =

Austrian-German architectural design team

Szyszkowitz + Kowalski is an Austrian-German architectural design team made up of Karla Kowalski and Michael Szyszkowitz. Their studio in Graz was established in 1978. Szyszkowitz + Kowalski are regarded to be major co-founders of the internationally renowned Grazer Schule (school of architecture). Originating in Graz in the 1970s, this name stands for architectural individualism of an especially creative type. Szyszkowitz + Kowalski put great emphasis on three-dimensional and expressive architectural language with a distinctive reference to landscape and context.

Since 2005 Szyszkowitz – Kowalski + Partner ZT GmbH (Partner: Michael Lyssy, Ignacio Chavero García)

In 2009 they donated the greater part of their life's work to the Berlin Akademie der Künste in a pre-mortem bequest.

Founding partner Michael Szyszkowitz died at 71 while on holiday in the Maldives in February 2016.

== Projects ==
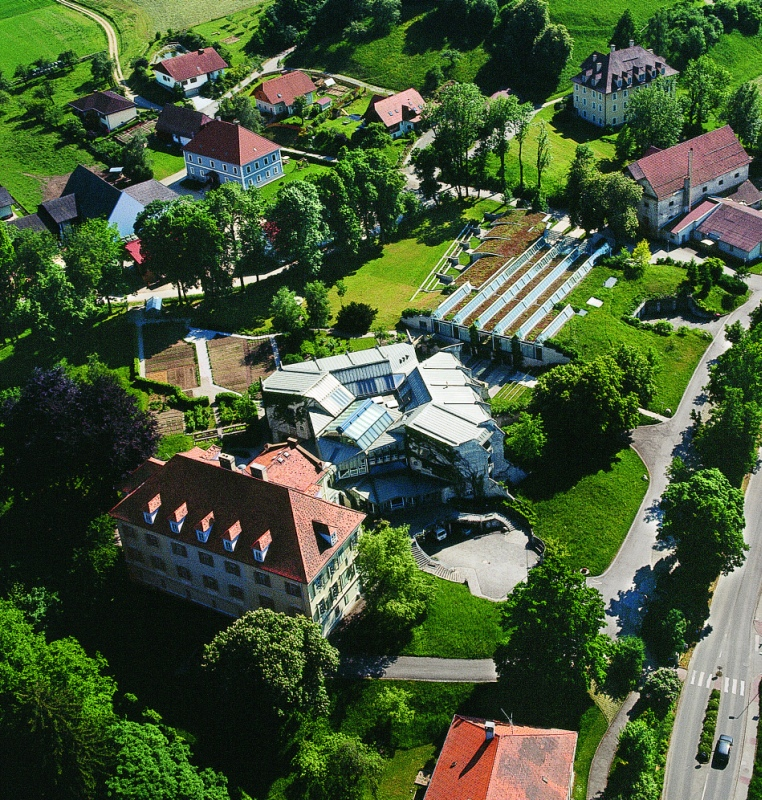
Schloss Großlobming, 1981

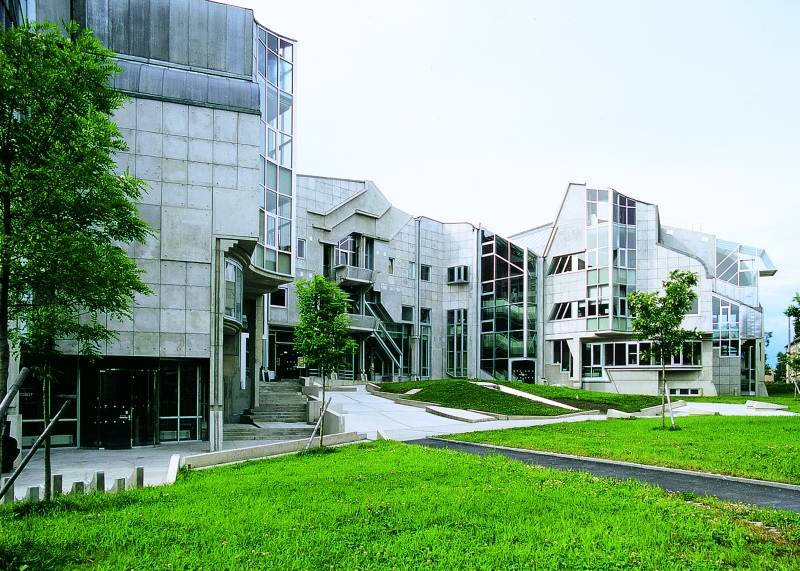
Biochemistry and Biotechnology TU-Graz, 1991

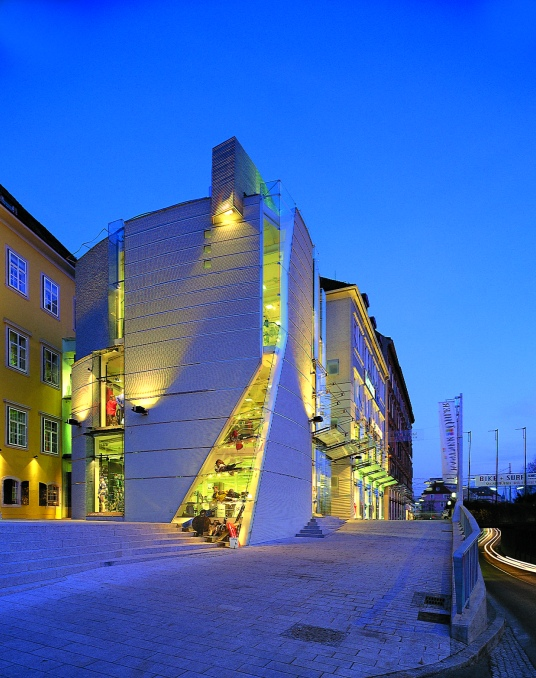
Kastner & Öhler Department Store, 1995

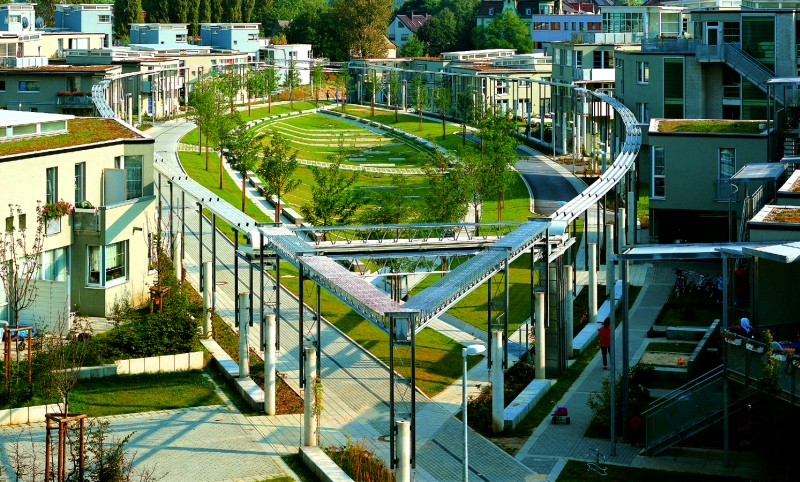
Küppersbusch Housing Complex, Gelsenkirchen, 1998

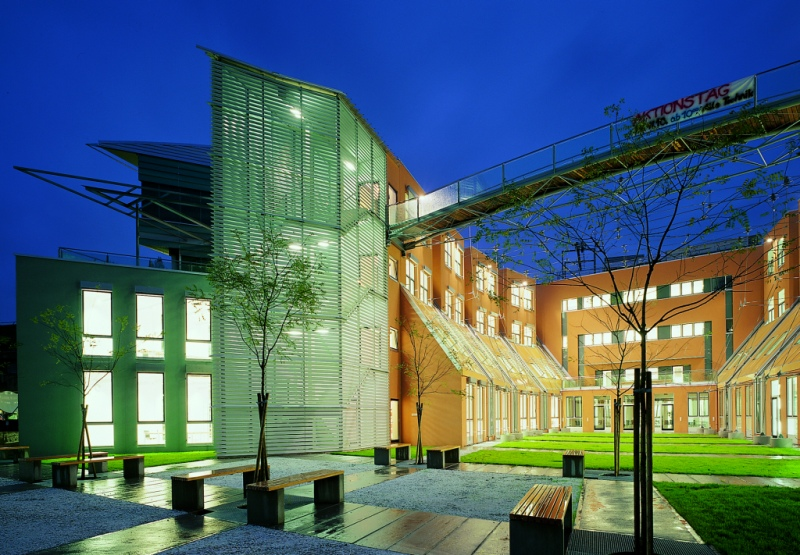
Inffeld Study Center TU-Graz, 2000

- Schloss Großlobming, Economics School with Boarding, Großlobming (1. Prize, Competition 1978), 1979–1981, and Primary School Großlobming 1994–1996
- New Living – Alte Poststraße, Residential Units, Graz, 1982–1984
- Catholic Parish-Centre Graz-Ragnitz, Church and Meeting House, (1. Prize, Competition 1983), 1984–1987
- Biochemistry and Biotechnology Graz, Institutes for the Technische Universität Graz, (1. Prize, Competition 1983), 1985–1991
- Kastner & Öhler, Department Store in the City Center of Graz, 6 Construction Stages, 1991–2010
- City Villas Mariagrün, Graz, 1995–1997
- UCI Cinema Annenhof, Graz, 1996–1997
- Experimental Living at IGA Stuttgart, 1991–1993
- Küppersbusch Housing Complex for Internationale Bauausstellung Emscher Park, Gelsenkirchen, (1. Prize, Competition 1990), 1994–1998
- Schiessstätte Graz Residential Building, Graz, 1997–1999
- Cultural Center St. Ulrich (Greith-Haus), St.Ulrich/Greith, 1998–2000
- Inffeld Graz Study Center, Institutes for the Technische Universität Graz, (1. Prize, Competition 1990), 1998–2000
- Remise Kreuzgasse, Residential units with public facilities, Vienna, (Prize, Competition 1994), 1999–2001
- High School Pernerstorfergasse, Vienna, (1. Prize, Competition 1999), 2001–2002
- Nürnberg Health Care Center, Nürnberg, Germany, (Prize, Competition 1992), 2002–2004
- High School Wiedner Gürtel, Vienna, (1. Prize, Competition 2000), 2002–2004
- Leoben Museum Center, Leoben, (Succeeder, Wettbewerb 1999), 2004
- Headquarters for the Graz Sparkasse and Sparkassensquare, Graz, (1 Prize, Competition 2005), 2005–2006
- Humanic Flagship Store, Graz, 2007
- Private Residences

== Awards ==
- "Fischer von Erlach Preis 2010"
- "ökosan 2007" Award for best technical engineering restoration
- European Union Prize for Cultural Heritage / Europa Nostra Award 2006
- Nomination for Austrian Stateprize "Consulting 2005"
- Winners of Styrian Geramb Award in 1981, 1982, 1985, 1992, 1997 and 2004
- Engineerprize of the Austrian Concrete- and Cement Industry 2004
- Winners of the Award of the Zentralvereinigung der Architekten Österreichs (Central Association of Austrian Architects) in 1982 and 1988 and 2001
- Distinguished with the German Architecture Prize 1999 for the Housing Complex Küppersbuschgelände, Gelsenkirchen
- Merit Award from the Ministry for Education and Arts 1990
- Special Austrian "Residential Building Award" 1987
- Styrian Prize for Architecture 1983
- First Austrian Timber Construction Award 1979

== Literature ==
- Frank R. Werner (Hg.): Szyszkowitz+Kowalski Architekturen 1994-2010, jovis Verlag, Berlin 2010, ISBN 978-3-86859-033-3
- Akademie der Künste (Hg.): Zeichnen zum Ort / Drawn from the Site , 2010, ISBN 978-3-88331-143-2
- Werner Durth (Hg.): Monster und andere Wahrheiten / Monsters and other Truths mit Essays von Manfred Sack, Werner Durth, Frank Werner, Karin Wilhelm, jovis Verlag, Berlin 2006, ISBN 3-936314-62-4
- Michael Szyszkowitz, Renate Ilsinger (Hg.): Architektur_STMK. Räumliche Positionen mit Schwerpunkt ab 1993, Verlag Haus der Architektur, Graz 2005, ISBN 3-901174-56-7
- Szyszkowitz + Kowalski, Renate Ilsinger (Hg.): St. Ulrich im Greith – Kulturhaus / Cultural Centre, Baudokumentation 20, Verlag Haus der Architektur, Graz 2004, ISBN 3-901174-52-4
- Karin Wilhelm: Idea and Form, Häuser von / Houses by Szyszkowitz+Kowalski, Birkhäuser Verlag 2003, ISBN 3-7643-6927-2
- Michael Szyszkowitz, Renate Ilsinger (Hg.): Architektur_Graz, Architekturbegleiter Graz, Verlag Haus der Architektur, Graz 2003, ISBN 3-901174-44-3
- Heiner Hierzegger, Renate Ilsinger u. a.: Lebensraum Wohnanlage Nordberggasse Graz. Baudokumentation 19, Verlag Haus der Architektur, Graz 2002, ISBN 3-901174-43-5
- Frank R. Werner: Mehrstimmiger Dialog, Studienzentrum Inffeldgründe der TU-Graz, Baudokumentation 18, Verlag Haus der Architektur, Graz 2001, ISBN 3-901174-42-7
- Frank R. Werner: Räume und Freiräume, Baudokumentation 16, Verlag Haus der Architektur, Graz 1999, ISBN 3-901174-38-9
- Claudia Orben: Metamorphosen eines Schlosses, Baudokumentation 11, Verlag Haus der Architektur, Graz 1996, ISBN 3-901174-22-2
- Sokrates Dimitriou: Innovation eines Kaufhauses in Graz, Baudokumentation 10, Verlag aus der Architektur, Graz 1995, ISBN 3-901174-05-2
- Andrea Gleiniger: Szyszkowitz+Kowalski, Monographie, Verlag Wasmuth, Graz 1994, ISBN 3-8030-2802-7
- Wolfgang Schäche: Szyszkowitz+Kowalski, Zwei Projekte für die Forschung, Berlin – Graz, Aedes, Galerie und Architekturforum, 1991
- Frank R. Werner: Biochemie und Biotechnologie, Baudokumentation 2, Verlag Haus der Architektur, Graz 1991, ISBN 3-901174-01-X
- Frank R. Werner: Arche-Tektonik pur, 5 Bauten – 5 Projekte 1985–1990. In: Architektur und Bauforum Nr. 139, 1990, Seite 19 – 42

== Exhibitions ==
- 2011 Hamburg, AIT-Architektursalon
- 2010 Berlin, Akademie der Künste
- other Exhibitions in Graz, Wien, Oslo, Edinburgh, Aberdeen, London, Liege, Nantes, Breslau, St. Moritz, Darmstadt, Gelsenkirchen, Stuttgart, Millstatt, Weimar, Berlin, Vancouver, Bologna, Klagenfurt, Mürzzuschlag
