= Dämmernde Stadt =

Painting by Egon Schiele

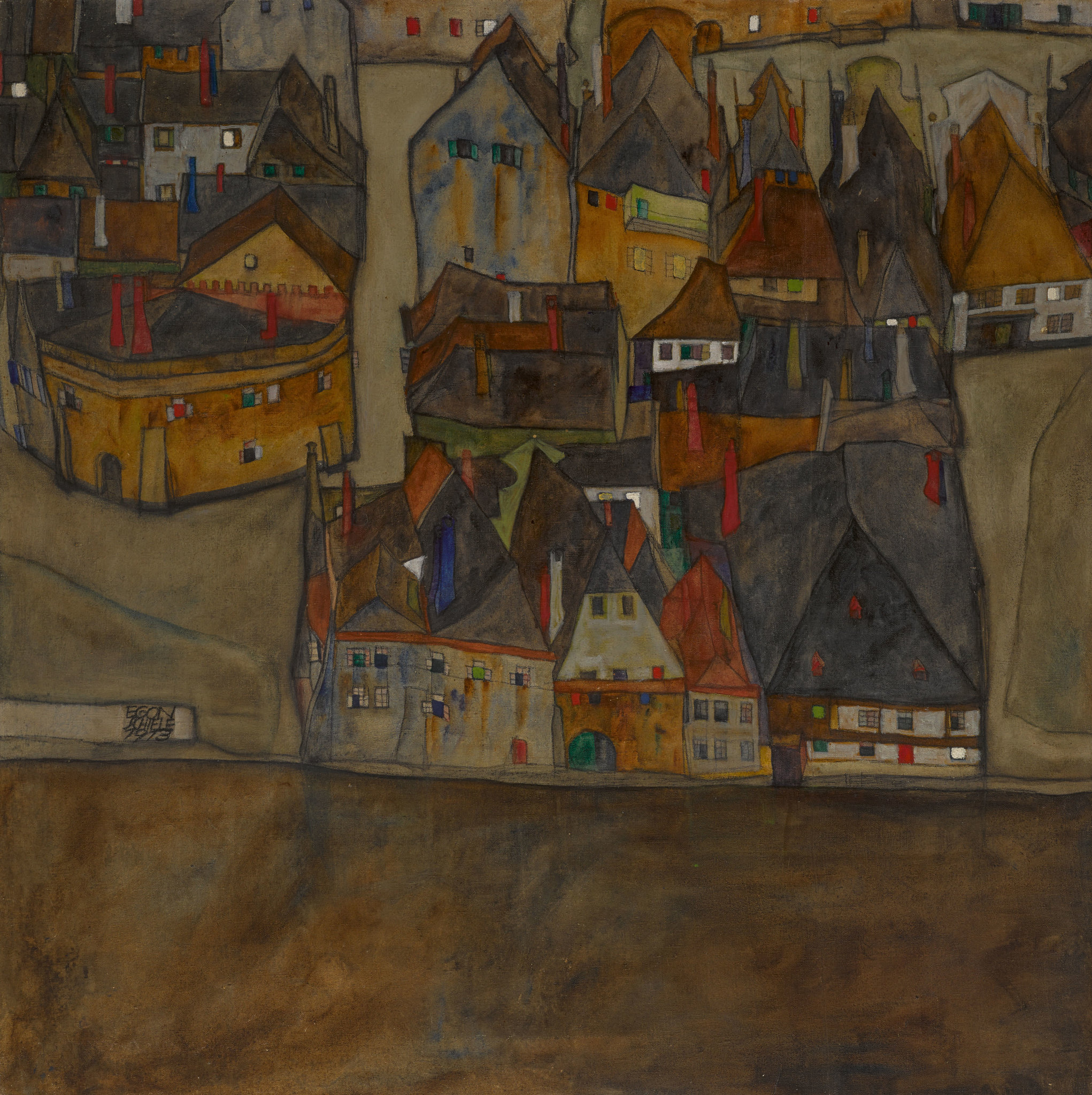
- Artist: Egon Schiele
- Year: 1913
- Medium: Oil on canvas
- Dimensions: 90.5 cm × 90.1 cm (35 5/8 in × 35 1/2 in)
- Location: Private collection

Dämmernde Stadt (City in Twilight) is an oil painting by Egon Schiele, a townscape of Krumau (today: Český Krumlov), completed in 1913. It also known as Die kleine Stadt II (The small town). It was owned until 1930 by Elsa Koditschek, a Jew who survived the Holocaust hidden in Vienna. The painting was taken from her during the Nazi regime. It was auctioned in 1950 at the Dorotheum in Vienna, and bought by a private collector. In 2018, it was auctioned in New York in an act of voluntary restitution, and the proceeds were shared by the descendants of both owners.

== History ==
Townscapes formed a large part of Schiele's work, who is known for nudes and self-portraits. He made them especially during his time in Krumau (today: Český Krumlov), where his mother Marie was born. The picturesque historic town (Altstadt) on both banks of the Vltava River now a UNESCO world heritage site. Schiele lived there with his muse and later partner Wally Neuzil in May to December 1910, and in May and June 1911. He had to leave because of his relationship to Wally, and due to reports about painting young nude models. He returned for short visits, then staying in guest houses. He completed, signed and dated Dämmernde Stadt in 1913. It is also known as Die kleine Stadt II and Die kleine Stadt III. The painting was shown at exhibitions the same year, in Budapest in March, and at two exhibitions in Munich.

Hubert Jung from Vienna bought Dämmernde Stadt in 1913 for 400 kronen, possibly in connection to the Budapest exhibition, together with Die kleine Stadt III for the same price. Elsa Koditschek, a Jewish widow in Vienna, owned the painting from 1928. It was taken from her during the Nazi regime. She survived the Holocaust hidden in Vienna. The painting was auctioned in 1950 at the Dorotheum in Vienna, and was bought by the private art collector Viktor Fogarassy in good faith.

In 2018, in a voluntary act of private restitution, it was auctioned by Sotheby's, with the proceeds to be shared by the descendants of both owners. It was first presented in London, and then auctioned in New York, selling for US$24.57 million (€21.81 million) against an estimate of $18 million.
