= Pro Oriente =

1964 Christian organization

The foundation Pro Oriente was founded in 1964 by the Viennese cardinal Franz König to improve relationships between the Roman Catholic and the Eastern Orthodox and Oriental Orthodox churches.

== History ==
The foundation was established during Second Vatican Council which opened the Catholic Church's doors to other religions with its decree on ecumenism, Unitatis Redintegratio. Pro Oriente has charters in Vienna, Graz, Salzburg and Linz. Pro Oriente experienced a crisis in the year 1998 with the death of its leader and president of many years, Alfred Stirnemann.

== Vienna Christological Formula ==
Pro Oriente established the Vienna Christological formula (Wiener Christologische Formel) in 1972 as a mutual new interpretation of the Christology of the Council of Chalcedon held by the Oriental Orthodox and Roman Catholic churches. It was based on a recommendation by the Coptic Church in Vienna and is among the most important contributions of the foundation.

"We believe that our Lord and Saviour, Jesus Christ, is God the Son Incarnate; perfect in his divinity and perfect in his humanity. His divinity was not separated from his humanity for a single moment, not for the twinkling of an eye. His humanity is one with his divinity without commixtion, without confusion, without division, without separation. We in our common faith in the one Lord Jesus Christ, regard his mystery inexhaustible and ineffable and for the human mind never fully comprehendible or expressible."
