= Concentus Musicus Wien =

Austrian music ensemble

- Orchestra
- Founded: 1953 by Nikolaus Harnoncourt and Alice Harnoncourt
- Location: Vienna, Austria
- Principal conductor: Stefan Gottfried
- Website: www.concentusmusicus.com/en/

Concentus Musicus Wien (CMW) is an Austrian baroque music ensemble based in Vienna. The CMW is recognized as a pioneer of the period-instrument performance movement.

== History ==
Nikolaus Harnoncourt and Alice Harnoncourt co-founded the CMW in 1953, along with several musicians from the Vienna Symphony Orchestra. The CMW did research and rehearsal for 4 years before their first official concert; although the ensemble made its 'unofficial' debut at the Konzerthaus, Vienna in 1954 with a production of Claudio Monteverdi's Orfeo, the CMW's first public concert was in May 1957 at the Schwarzenberg Palace in Vienna. The CMW gave a regular concert series at the Schwarzenberg Palace from 1958 to 1962. The CMW made its formal debut in the Mozart-Saal of the Vienna Konzerthaus in February 1962, and performed concerts regularly there until 1971. The CMW staged its first opera at the 1971 Wiener Festwochen with Monteverdi's Il ritorno d'Ulisse in patria. The CMW's first concert at the Musikverein, Vienna, was in 1973. The orchestra has continued to perform regularly at the Musikverein since then. Nikolaus Harnoncourt directed the ensemble from the cello until 1987, and subsequently led the CMW as its conductor and artistic director.

The CMW has performed at European music festivals in such cities as Salzburg and Lucerne, as well as the styriarte festival in Graz which Harnoncourt founded. The CMW first toured North America in 1966, including its Boston debut for the Peabody Mason Concert series. Subsequent American tours followed in 1968 and in 1971.

Nikolaus Harnoncourt retired from the CMW and from conducting in general in December 2015. In parallel with her husband's retirement, Alice Harnoncourt retired from the CMW. In succession to Alice Harnoncourt, the current leader of the ensemble (concertmaster) is Erich Höbarth. In succession to Nikolaus Harnoncourt, the CMW's current artistic leader is the harpsichordist Stefan Gottfried. The ensemble's current manager is Maximilian Harnoncourt, grandson of Nikolaus and Alice Harnoncourt.

== Recordings ==
The CMW made their first recording in 1962, of music for viols by Henry Purcell, for the Telefunken label. This recording began a long recording relationship with Telefunken, later Teldec, that continued into the 1990s. Among the CMW's recording projects with Telefunken and Teldec was their participation in the complete cycle of cantatas of Johann Sebastian Bach, over the period from 1971 to 1990. The cantatas were split between two conductors, on the one hand the CMW and Harnoncourt, and on the other Gustav Leonhardt and the Leonhardt-Consort. In addition to their long series of recordings for Telefunken and Teldec, the CMW has made commercial recordings for other labels such as Deutsche Harmonia Mundi and Sony Classical. The CMW's final commercial recordings with Nikolaus Harnoncourt were two recordings of music of Ludwig van Beethoven, the 4th and 5th Symphonies and the Missa solemnis, the latter being Harnoncourt's final recording.

== Honors and awards ==
- 1990 and 1991, German Record Critics' Prize – Wolfgang Amadeus Mozart's opera Lucio Silla and George Frideric Handel's oratorio Theodora, respectively
- 1990, Gramophone Award for Special Achievement – Recording of the complete Bach cantatas
- 1995, Cannes Classical Award – J.S. Bach's St John Passion (BWV 245)
- 1996–1997, top awards from three different French music publications – recordings of Mozart's Il re pastore, Antonio Vivaldi concertos, and J.S. Bach motets
