= Palais Meran =

Residential palace in Graz, Austria

Coordinates: 47°04′20.63″N 15°26′59.34″E

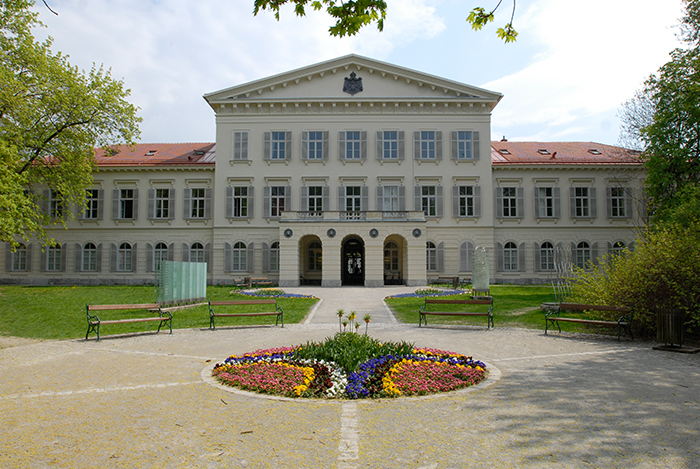
Palais Meran

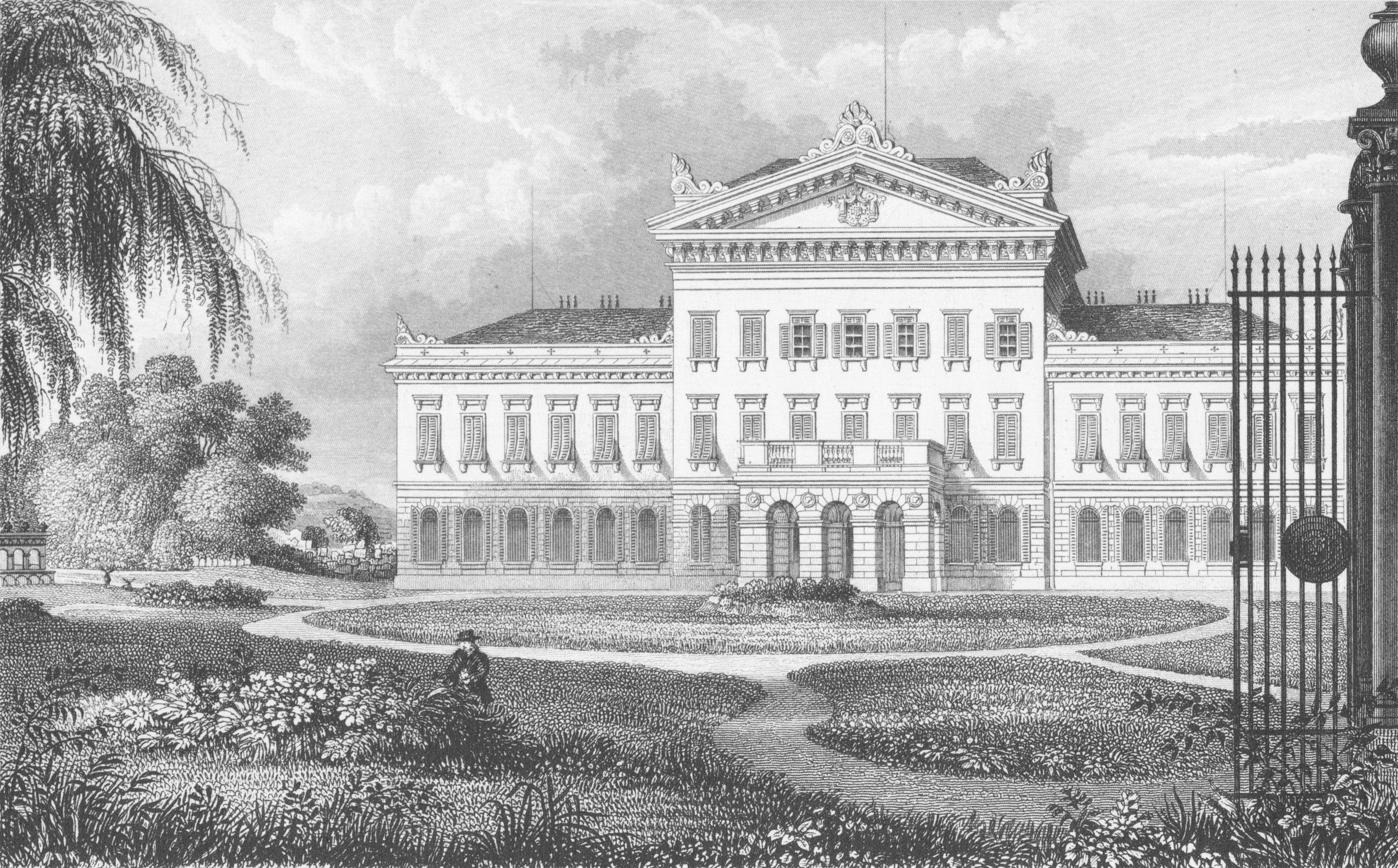
Engraving by Conrad Kreuzer

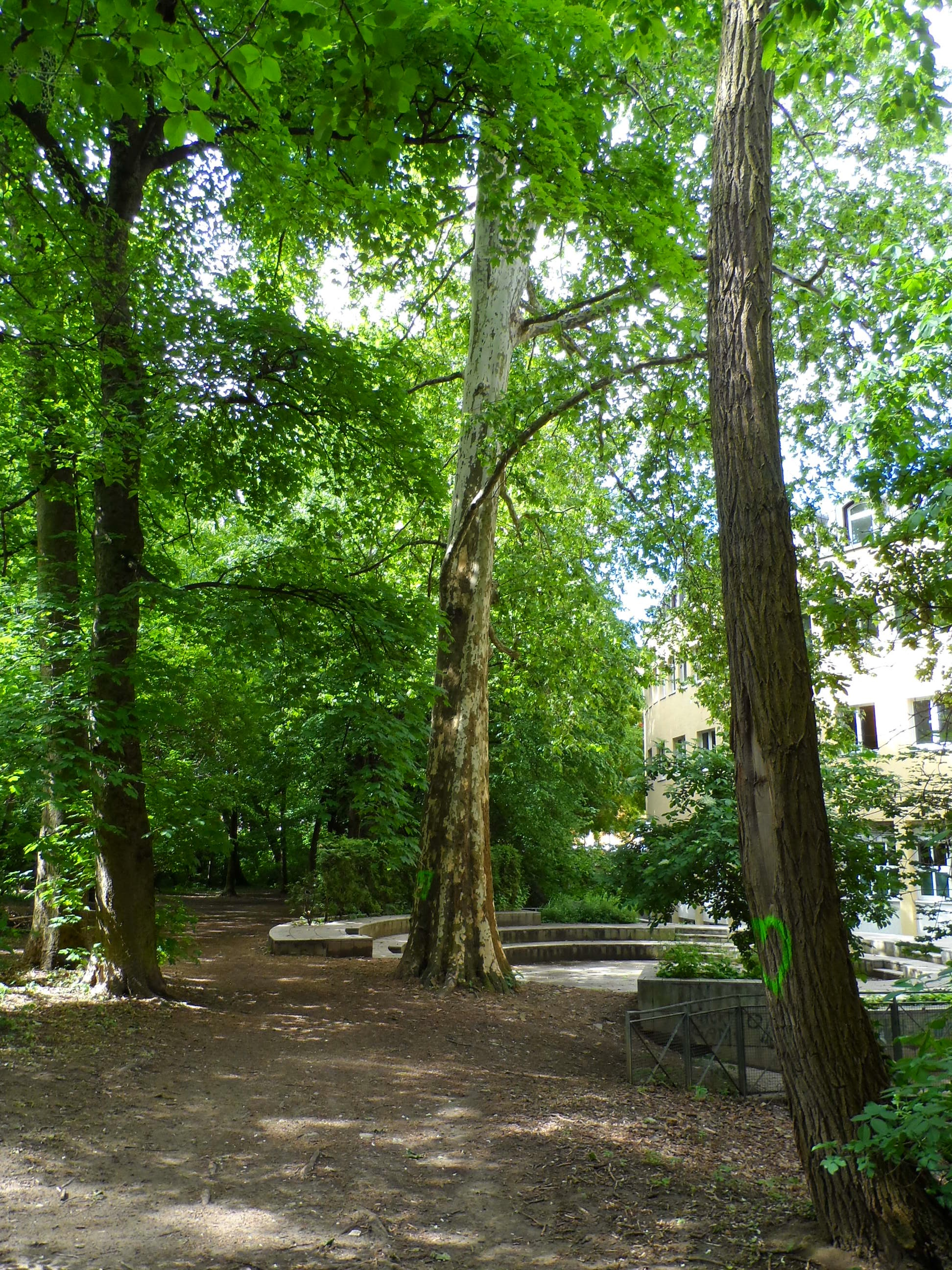
Amphitheater in Meranpark

The Palais Meran is a palace in Graz, Styria, Austria. Built as a residence for Archduke John of Austria in 1843, it now serves as the University of Music and Performing Arts Graz, surrounded by a public park.

== History ==
The Palais Meran was built from 1841 to 1843 by Georg Hauberrisser as the residence of Archduke John of Austria. Hauberrisser was not the architect as is evident from correspondence. Felix von Stregen played a role during stages of the building process; whether the Archduke himself conceived the facade and interior design is merely rumored.

The Palais is surrounded by an extended park. The Archduke died in the palace on 11 May 1859. The building was named after his son, Franz, Count of Meran, who gained this title in 1844. The family used the palace until 1939.

An addition to the north was added in 1880, and the building was expanded again in 1939 and 1963. Since 1963, the Steirischen Akademie für Musik und Darstellende Kunst (later the University of Music and Performing Arts Graz) has used all rooms of the facility in two halls for performances and rooms for institutes and administration.

== Architecture ==
The Palais was built in late classicist style. It features a wide facade. The wrought-iron lattice fixtures date back to the building time. The Archduke's coat of arms is shown in the gable. The three-aisled vestibule has a square vault supported by pillars. The hall on the first floor features a scagliola wall structure and a wooden ceiling decorated with carvings and coats of arms.

The building's exterior restoration, led by architect Ignaz Holub, was begun in 1976 and completed in 1979. Interior restoration was completed in 1985 with the Florentinersaal, a concert hall especially for chamber music. In another restoration from 2007 to 2008, modern requirements for fire protection were realised and the building made barrier-free. The facades were restored in a historically correct colour scheme.

== Park ==
The park was opened to the public in 1982. Busts by Wolfgang Skala of Anton Bruckner and Franz Liszt were installed there in 1986. A bust of Hugo Wolf by Wilhelm Gösser was installed in 1988. Artworks include also sculptures designed by Katja Cruz to Alban Berg's Violin Concerto, Arnold Schoenberg's Moses und Aron, and Anton Webern's Symphony. In 2019 the park was restored closer to its historic design.
