= Kastner & Öhler =

Austrian chain of department stores

- Industry: Chain of department stores
- Founded: 1873; 153 years ago
- Founders: Karl Kastner; Herman Öhler
- Headquarters: Graz, Austria
- Area served: Southern Austria
- Key people: Thomas Böck; Martin Wäg; Andreas Zinschitz; Alexander Petrskovsky
- Website: www.kastner-oehler.at

Kastner & Öhler is an Austrian chain of department stores, based in Graz, Styria, Austria, and mainly active in southern Austria. The family-run company dates back to a shop founded in 1873 by Karl Kastner and Herman Öhler. They were the first company in Central Europe to install fixed prices and ran mail orders, and built the first department store in Austria-Hungary. Today's company includes an online shop and the chain for sport, Gigasport, established in 1994.

== History ==
On 1 January 1873, Karl Kastner and Herman Öhler founded a shop for mercery in Troppau (today: Opava). When Karl Kastner was held up in Graz in 1883, he strolled through the town and found a free shop in the Sackstraße. He rented it, and it became the location of the company. The company was the first in Central Europe to introduce fixed prices, and to run a mail order service. They sent catalogues in several languages to customers throughout Austria-Hungary.

The branch in Zagreb was founded in 1879. Over the years, the store in changed addresses, until it ended up in Ilica 4.

In 1894, the company expanded and built the first department store in Austria-Hungary in Graz, with galleries on three floors, which could be reached by elevators, and a central courtyard with a glass roof. The store was expanded from 1912 to 1914 by the architects Fellner & Helmer from Vienna who had already built the Graz Opera. They designed one of the most advanced warehouses in Europe, with air conditioning and a room for refreshments. The Große Halle was decorated with a coloured glass dome. Before World War I, 330 employees sold hats, perfumes, leather goods, paper and men's clothes. In 1917, additional products were toys, household goods, china, glass and stoves.

== Nazi era ==
In 1939, the owners Franz Öhler, Richard Kastner (1875–1959), and Albert Kastner sold the company to their sons-in-law, to avoid confiscation by the Nazi regime. They escaped to Croatia, but Öhler was arrested and died at Buchenwald concentration camp in 1945. The company was renamed Alpenlandkaufhaus (Alpin country department store)

In occupied Croatia, the store was renamed to Kastner i Grgić. After 1945, the company in Croatian was nationalized and taken over by the newly-founded trade organization Narodni magazin headquartered in Belgrade.

== Postwar ==
The house in Graz was damaged when the city was bombed in 1945. After the war, a third generation of owners ran the store with then 168 employees. In 1959, the first escalator in Styria was installed. For the centenary in 1973, a new logo was designed by Janusz Grabiański and Jabłoński, showing a lion's head. It remained in use until 1991. The house in Graz was modernised in 1991, designed by Szyszkowitz + Kowalski, connecting the historic buildings with modern elements.

The mail order business was sold in 1994 to Neckermann, renamed to Neckermann Versand Österreich AG in 1997. Since 2004, the company has focused on two brands, Kastner & Öhler for fashion, household goods, toys and perfumes, and Gigasport for sports. Besides Graz, the company runs stores in Bärnbach, Fohnsdorf, Fürstenfeld, Kapfenberg/Sankt Lorenzen im Mürztal, Leoben, Liezen, Oberwart, Ried im Innkreis, Spittal an der Drau, Villach, Vöcklabruck and Wolfsberg.

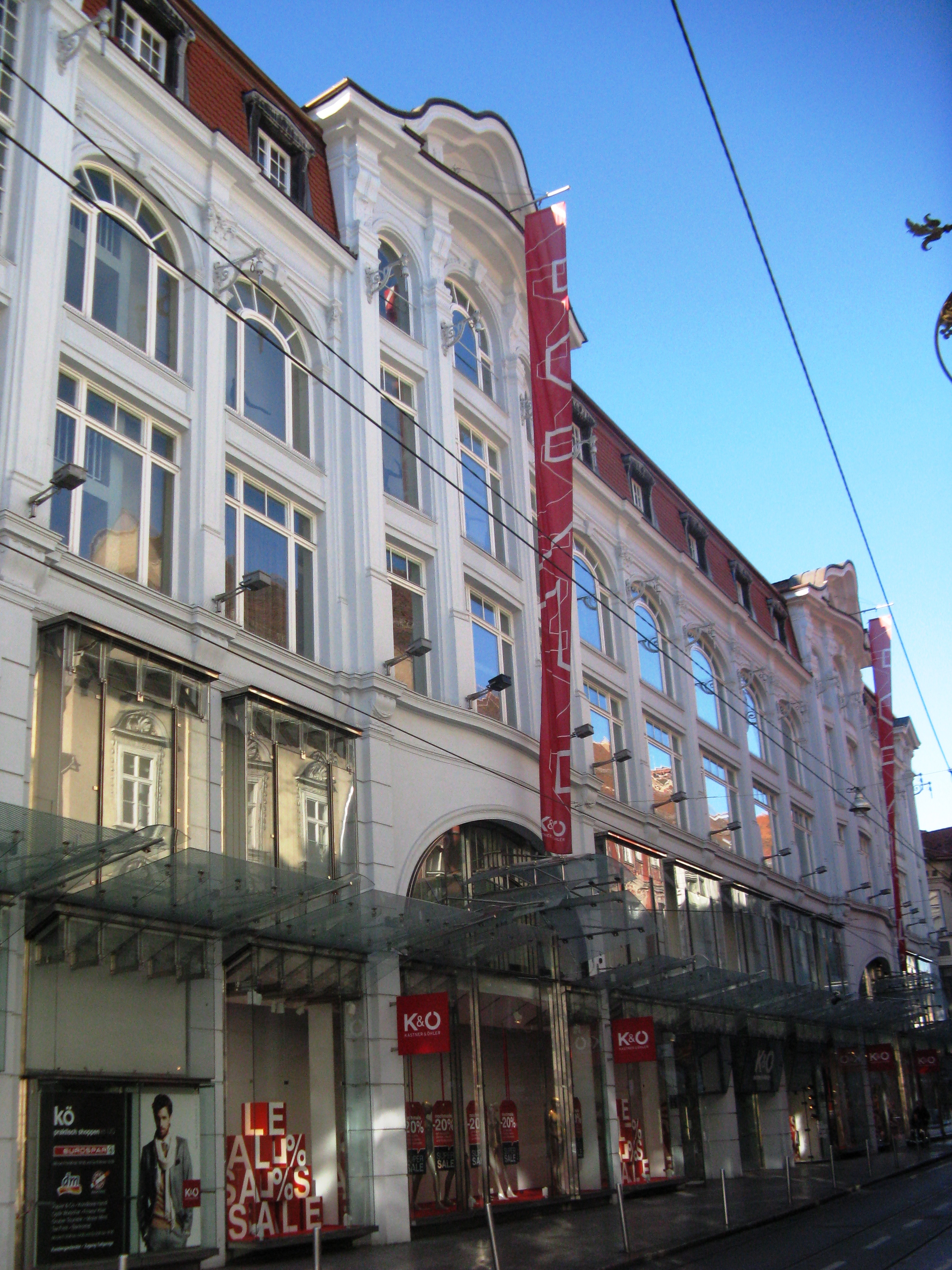
Kastner & Öhler in Graz

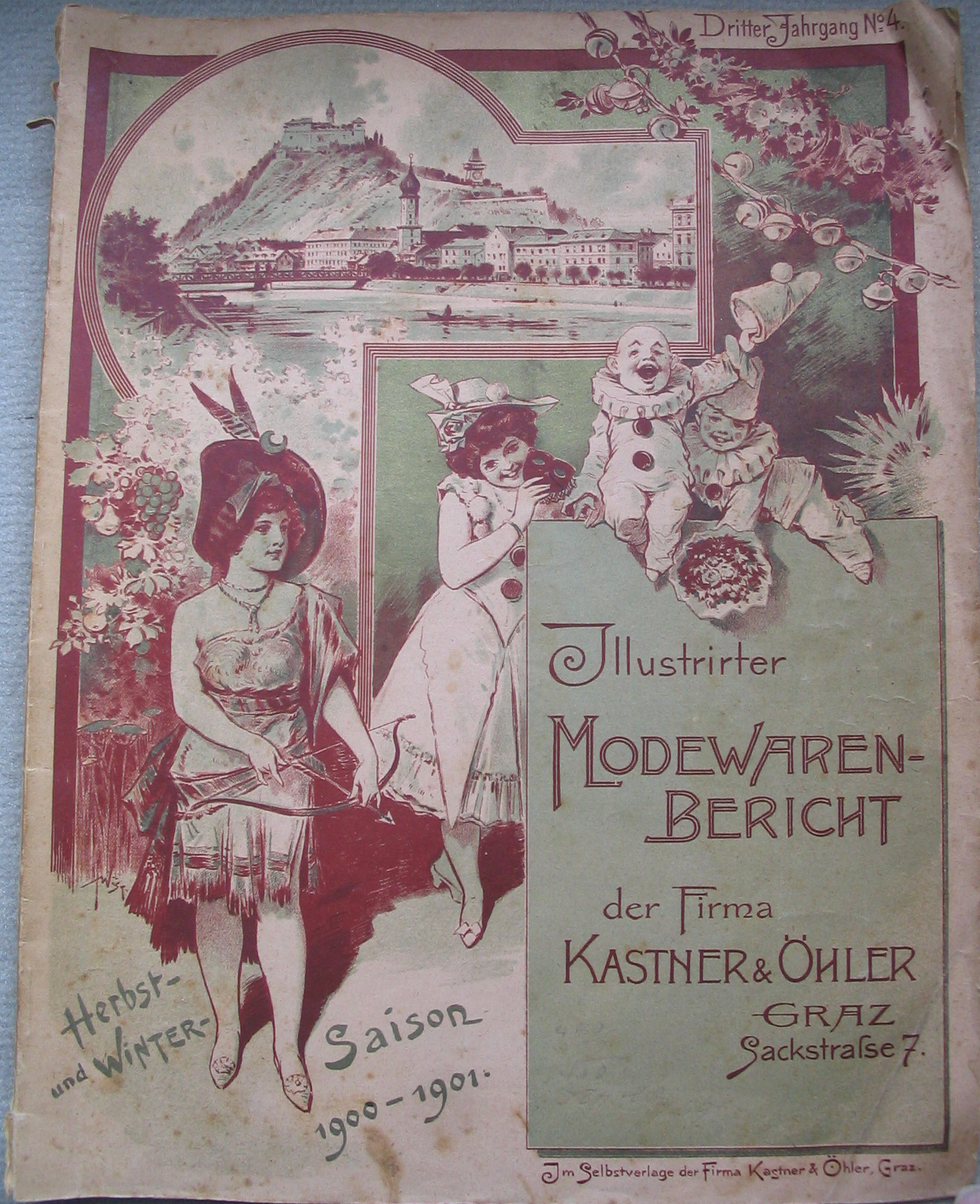
Fall and winter fashion, 1900/01

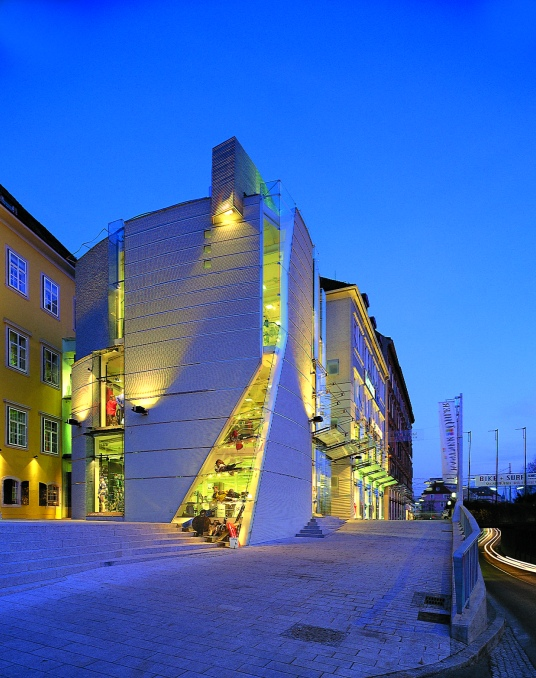
Gigasport in Graz, 1995

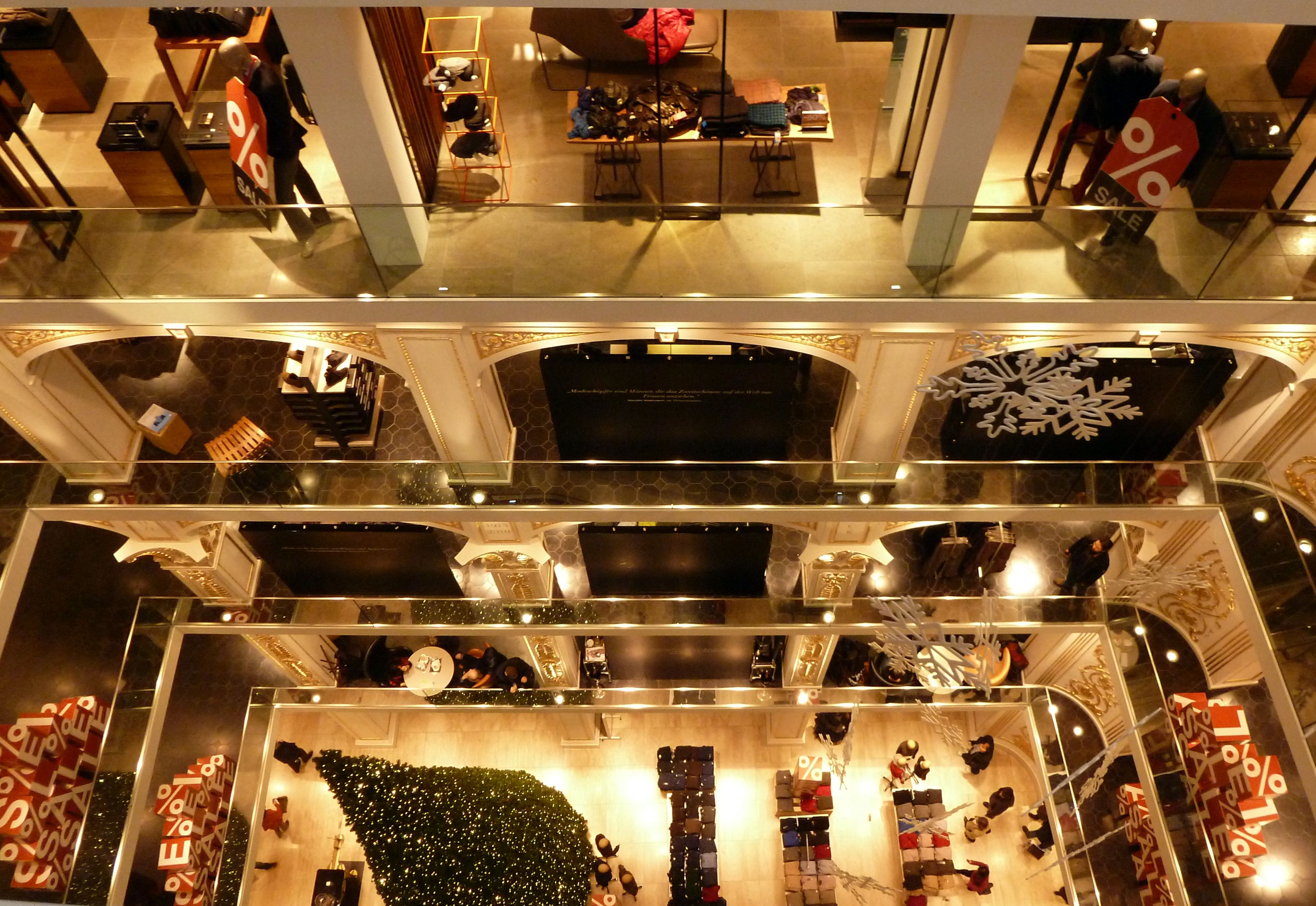
Graz interior in 2012

== See also ==
- The Holocaust in Austria
- Aryanization
- Gerngroß Department Store
