= Nikolaus Harnoncourt =

Austrian conductor (1929–2016)

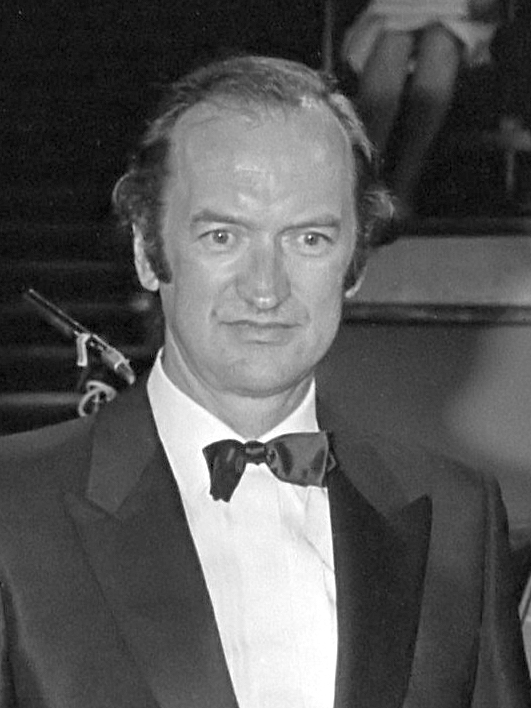
- Harnoncourt in 1980
- Born: Johann Nikolaus Harnoncourt; 6 December 1929; Berlin, Germany
- Died: 5 March 2016 (aged 86); St Georgen im Attergau, Austria
- Other names: Johann Nikolaus Graf de la Fontaine und d'Harnoncourt-Unverzagt (nobility historically)
- Occupations: Cellist, conductor
- Organization: Concentus Musicus Wien
- Known for: Pioneer of historically informed performance
- Spouse(s): Alice Hoffelner (m. 1953–2016; his death)
- Children: 4 (including Elisabeth von Magnus)
- Parent: Ladislaja Harnoncourt
- Awards: Erasmus Prize; Léonie Sonning Music Prize; Polar Music Prize; Ernst von Siemens Music Prize

Signature
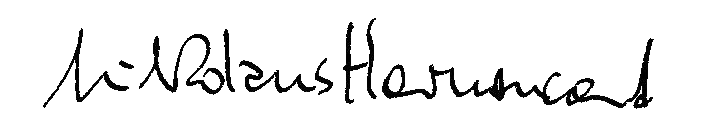

Johann Nikolaus Harnoncourt (Note: Historically Johann Nikolaus Graf de la Fontaine und d'Harnoncourt-Unverzagt; Regarding personal names and titles: Until 1919, Graf was a title, translated as Count, not a first or middle name. The female form was Gräfin. In Austria, with the passage of the ″Adelsaufhebungsgesetz″ of 3 April 1919, both nobility itself and all titles of nobility were abolished. Unlike Germany, noble titles in Austria were not part of the name.) (6 December 1929 – 5 March 2016) was an Austrian conductor, known for his historically informed performances. He specialized in music of the Baroque period, but later extended his repertoire to include Classical and early Romantic works. Among his best known recordings are those of Bach, whose 193 cantatas he recorded with Gustav Leonhardt.

Starting out as a classical cellist, he founded his own period instrument ensemble, Concentus Musicus Wien, in 1953, and became a pioneer of the Early Music movement. Around 1970, Harnoncourt began conducting opera and concert performances, soon leading international symphony orchestras, and appearing at leading concert halls, operatic venues and festivals. In 2001 and 2003, he conducted the Vienna New Year's Concert. Harnoncourt was also the author of several books, mostly on subjects of performance history and musical aesthetics.

== Early life ==
Johann Nikolaus Harnoncourt was born as an Austrian citizen in Berlin, Germany, in 1929. His Austrian mother, Ladislaja née Gräfin von Meran, Freiin von Brandhoven, was the great-granddaughter of the Habsburg Archduke Johann, the 13th child of Emperor Leopold II, making him a descendant of Holy Roman Emperors and other European royalty. His father, Eberhard Harnoncourt, born de la Fontaine Graf d'Harnoncourt-Unverzagt, was an Austrian engineer working in Berlin who had two children from a previous marriage. Two years after Nikolaus's birth, his brother Philipp was born, and also in 1931, the family moved to the Styrian capital Graz, Austria, where they took up residence in their ancestral home, Palais Meran. Eberhard obtained a post in the state government (Landesregierung) of Styria.

Harnoncourt was raised in Graz, and studied music in Vienna. During his youth, he served in the Hitler Youth under duress, where, as he noted:

If you didn't go there every Wednesday and Saturday, the Hitler Youth police would come, fetch you, cut your hair and toss you into a group with other difficult ones who were treated terribly.

At the Vienna Music Academy, Harnoncourt studied cello with Paul Grümmer and Emanuel Brabec, and also learned viola da gamba.

== Career ==
Harnoncourt was a cellist with the Vienna Symphony from 1952 to 1969. In 1953, he founded the period-instrument ensemble Concentus Musicus Wien with his wife, Alice Hoffelner, whom he married during the year. The Concentus Musicus Wien was dedicated to performances on period instruments. He played the viola da gamba at this time, as well as the cello. For the Telefunken (later Teldec) label, Harnoncourt recorded Baroque repertoire, beginning with the viol music of Henry Purcell, and extending to include works like Bach's The Musical Offering, Monteverdi's L'incoronazione di Poppea, and Rameau's Castor et Pollux. One of his final recordings with the Concentus Musicus Wien was of Beethoven's Symphonies Nos. 4 and 5.

One reason that Harnoncourt left the Vienna Symphony was to become a conductor. He made a conducting debut at La Scala, Milan, in 1972/ 73 season, leading a production of Monteverdi's Il ritorno d'Ulisse in patria at La Piccola Scala.

In 1971, Harnoncourt established a joint project with conductor Gustav Leonhardt to record all of J.S. Bach's cantatas. The Teldec Bach cantata project was eventually completed in 1990 and was the only cantata cycle to use an all-male choir and soloist roster, with the exception of cantatas nos. 51 and 199, which were intended for a female soprano voice. He also made the first recordings in historically informed performance of Bach's Mass in B minor (1968) and St Matthew Passion (1970). In 2001, an acclaimed and Grammy Award winning recording of the St Matthew Passion with the Arnold Schoenberg Choir was released, which included the entire score of the piece in Bach's own hand on a CD-ROM. This was his third recording of the work.

Harnoncourt later performed with many orchestras performing on modern instruments, but retaining considerations for historical authenticity in terms of tempi and dynamics, among other issues. He also expanded his repertoire, continuing to play the baroque works, but also championing the Viennese operetta repertoire. He made a benchmark recording of Beethoven's symphonies with the Chamber Orchestra of Europe (COE), and recorded Beethoven's piano concertos with Pierre-Laurent Aimard and the COE.

Harnoncourt was a guest conductor of the Vienna Philharmonic and made several recordings with the orchestra. Between 1987 and 1991, he conducted four new productions of Mozart operas at the Vienna State Opera (1987–91: Idomeneo; 1988–90: Die Zauberflöte; 1989: Die Entführung aus dem Serail; 1989–91: Così fan tutte). He directed the Vienna Philharmonic's New Year's Day concerts in 2001 and 2003.

In 1992, Harnoncourt debuted at the Salzburg Festival conducting a concert with the Chamber Orchestra of Europe. In the following years, he led several concerts with the Chamber Orchestra of Europe, the Vienna Philharmonic and the Concentus Musicus. Harnoncourt also served as the conductor for major opera productions of the Festival: L'incoronazione di Poppea (1993), Mozart's Le nozze di Figaro (1995 and 2006), Don Giovanni (2002, marking also Anna Netrebko's international breakthrough as Donna Anna, and 2003) and La clemenza di Tito (2003 and 2006), and Purcell's King Arthur (2004). In 2012, Harnoncourt conducted a new production of Die Zauberflöte staged by Jens-Daniel Herzog.

Harnoncourt made his guest-conducting debut with the Concertgebouw Orchestra, Amsterdam in 1975. He continued as a guest conductor with the orchestra, including in several opera productions and recordings. In October 2000, the Royal Concertgebouw Orchestra (KCO) named him their Honorair gastdirigent (Honorary Guest Conductor). His final appearance with the KCO was in October 2013, leading Bruckner's Symphony No. 5.

Other recordings outside of the baroque and classical era repertoire included his 2002 recording of Bruckner's Symphony No. 9 with the Vienna Philharmonic. An accompanying second CD contained a lecture by Harnoncourt about the symphony with musical examples, including the rarely heard fragments from the unfinished finale. In 2009, Harnoncourt recorded Gershwin's Porgy and Bess, taken from live performances at Graz. He was a conductor for the Rudolf Buchbinder's recording of Wolfgang Amadeus Mozart's Piano concertos No. 23 & 25.

On 5 December 2015, one day before his 86th birthday, Harnoncourt announced his retirement via his website. "My bodily strength requires me to cancel my future plans," he wrote in a hand-written letter inserted into the program on his 86th birthday of a concert by the Concentus Musicus Wien.

=== Styriarte ===
Harnoncourt was the focus of the annual festival of classical music Styriarte, founded in 1985 to tie him closer to his hometown, Graz. He programmed the festival for 31 years. Events have been held at different venues in Graz and in the surrounding region.

== Personal life ==
Harnoncourt met his wife Alice through their mutual interest in historically informed performances of Baroque music and co-founded the Concentus Musicus Wien. Their daughter is the mezzo-soprano Elisabeth von Magnus. Their two surviving sons are Philipp and Franz. Their third son Eberhard, a violin maker, died in 1990 in an automobile accident.

Harnoncourt died on 5 March 2016 in the village of Sankt Georgen im Attergau, north east of Salzburg. His widow Alice, their three adult children, seven grandchildren, and three great-grandchildren survived him. Alice died in July 2022.

== Awards ==
- Erasmus Prize (Praemium Erasmianum Foundation, Netherlands, 1980)
- Joseph Marx Music Prize of the province of Styria (1982)
- Austrian Cross of Honour for Science and Art, 1st class (1987)
- Honorary Membership of the Society of Music Friends in Vienna (1992)
- Léonie Sonning Music Prize (Denmark, 1993)
- Polar Music Prize (Sweden, 1994)
- Honorary Membership of the University of the Arts Graz (1995)
- Hanseatic Goethe Prize (1995)
- Robert Schumann Prize of the City of Zwickau (1997)
- Hans von Bülow Medal (Berlin, 1999)
- Honorary Guest Conductor of the Royal Concertgebouw Orchestra (Amsterdam, 2000)
- Grammy Award (2001)
- Ernst von Siemens Music Prize (Bavarian Academy of Fine Arts, 2002)
- Bremen Music Festival Prize (2002)
- Georg Philipp Telemann Prize (Magdeburg, 2004)
- Kyoto Prize for Lifetime Achievement (Japan, 2005)
- Grand Gold Decoration with Star of Styria (2005)
- Bach Medal (Leipzig, 2007)
- Austrian Decoration for Science and Art (2008)
- Honorary doctor (Mozarteum University Salzburg, 2008)
- Honorary Citizenship of Sankt Georgen im Attergau (2009)
- Gramophone Lifetime Achievement Award (London, 2009)
- Royal Philharmonic Society Gold Medal (2010)
- Honorary Doctorate from the University of Music and Dance Cologne (2011)
- Gold Medal for services to the city of Vienna (2011) (together with Alice Harnoncourt)
- Romano Guardini Prize (2012)
- Voted into the Gramophone Hall of Fame (London, 2012)

Harnoncourt was a member of the Royal Swedish Academy of Music and of the Order Pour le Mérite for Science and Art, and an Honorary Doctor of the University of Edinburgh.

== Recordings ==
- Nikolaus Harnoncourt, Frans Brüggen, Leopold Stastny, Herbert Tachezi. Johann Sebastian Bach: Gamba Sonatas — Trio Sonata in G major. Viola da gamba: Jacobus Stainer; Cello: Andrea Castagneri; Flute: A.Grenser; Harpsichord: a copy after Italian builders by Martin Skowroneck. Label: Telefunken.
- Nikolaus Harnoncourt, Gustav Leonhardt, Leonhardt-Consort (Orchestra), Concentus musicus Wien (Orchestra), Alan Curtis, Anneke Ulttenbosch, Herbert Tachezi. Johann Sebastian Bach: Harpsichord Concertos BWV 1052, 1057, 1064. Violin, continuo, harpsichord. Label: Teldec
- Nikolaus Harnoncourt, Chamber Orchestra of Europe. Franz Schubert. Symphonies. Label: Ica Classics.
- Nikolaus Harnoncourt, Rudolf Buchbinder (fortepiano). Wolfgang Amadeus Mozart. Piano concertos No. 23&25 Played on a Walter fortepiano replica by Paul McNulty. Label: Sony.
- Nikolaus Harnoncourt, Chamber Orchestra of Europe, Pierre-Laurent Aimard (piano). Ludwig van Beethoven. Piano Concertos Nos. 1–5. Label: Teldec Classics.
- Nikolaus Harnoncourt, Chamber Orchestra of Europe, Gidon Kremer (violin), Martha Argerich (piano). Schumann: Piano Concerto and Violin Concerto. Label: Teldec Classics

== Bibliography ==
- Harnoncourt, Nikolaus (1983). Musik als Klangrede: Wege zu einem neuen Musikverständnis. Salzburg: Residenz Verlag. ISBN 978-3-7017-0315-9.
- Harnoncourt, Nikolaus (1993). Die Macht der Musik: Zwei Reden. Salzburg: Residenz Verlag. ISBN 978-3-7017-0827-7.
- Harnoncourt, Nikolaus; Pauly, Reinhard G. (1988). Baroque Music Today: Music As Speech. Portland, OR: Amadeus Press. ISBN 978-0-931340-91-8.
- Harnoncourt, Nikolaus (1997). The Musical Dialogue: Thoughts on Monteverdi, Bach, and Mozart. Portland, OR: Amadeus Press. ISBN 1-57467-023-9.

== See also ==
- List of Austrians in music

== Sources ==
- Gratzer, Wolfgang (ed.) (2009). Ereignis Klangrede. Nikolaus Harnoncourt als Dirigent und Musikdenker (klang-reden 3), Freiburg/Br.: Rombach. ISBN 978-3-7930-9551-4
- Official catalogue Nikolaus Harnoncourt. Die Universität Mozarteum Salzburg ehrt den Dirigenten und Musikdenker. Salzburg: Universität Mozarteum 2008
