= Salzofen Cave =

Cave and archaeological site in Austria

- Salzofenhöhle (German)
- Location in Austria
- 47°40′50″N 13°56′10″E
- Periods: Palaeolithic
- Location: municipality of Grundlsee
- Region: Salzkammergut, Styria, Austria

Salzofen Cave is an archaeological site in Styria, Austria. It is located in the municipality of Grundlsee at an altitude of approximately 2,000 m (6,600 ft), about sixty meters below the summit. It is known for its Neolithic and Middle Paleolithic finds of fireplaces, stone tools, and bone tools, the latter dating from 65000 to 31000 BCE.

== Overview ==
In 1924 two hunters, who had taken shelter in the cave from a storm found several fossilized bones in the entrance area. They handed them over to Otto Körber, a local school principal from Bad Aussee. Körber visited the site on the next day and immediately began to dig, progressing almost 100 m (330 ft) until summer, unearthing large amounts of bone fossils. He soon realized, that most of the faunal remains are to be attributed to an interglacial period. The vast majority of the bones belonged to cave bears, and Körber was able to reconstruct an entire cave skeleton from his findings. In deeper and older layers, he discovered bone fossils of wolf, marten, Alpine ibex and a complete wolverine skeleton. In 1934 Körber found the first and for him only object made by prehistoric humans, a scraper made of horn although numerous charcoal fragments and burnt bones lead him to conclude, that he had found one of the most elevated occupation sites of Paleo-humans in Europe. During 1939, 1948 to 1953 and 1956 to 1964 excavations took place under the leadership of Kurt Ehrenberg. He found assemblages of tools and objects and suspiciously arrangements of bear skulls, that could only be attributed to human activity.
