= Archduke John (film) =

1929 Austrian silent film

- Directed by: Max Neufeld
- Written by: Alfred Deutsch-German
- Starring: Igo Sym; Xenia Desni; Werner Pittschau; Paul Biensfeldt
- Cinematography: Hans Theyer
- Production company: Hugo Engel-Filmgesellschaft
- Release date: 25 January 1929
- Running time: 110 minutes
- Country: Austria
- Languages: Silent; German intertitles

Archduke John (German: Erzherzog Johann) is a 1929 Austrian silent historical drama film directed by Max Neufeld and starring Igo Sym, Xenia Desni and Paul Biensfeldt. It portrays the life of Archduke John of Austria, a nineteenth century member of the Habsburg Dynasty.

It was shot at the Schönbrunn Studios in Vienna and on location in Styria. The film's sets were designed by the art director Hans Ledersteger.

== Cast ==
- Igo Sym as Erzherzog Johann
- Xenia Desni as Anna Plochl, Postillon von Aussee
- Paul Biensfeldt as Kaiser Ferdinand I.
- Hans Homma as Fürst Metternich, Staatskanzler
- Werner Pittschau as Graf Ferdinand Prokesch
- Carl Auen as Der Herrnhofbauer
- Max Maximilian as Franz Plochl, K.k.Posthalter Aussee
- Paul Askonas as Graf Arnhorst, Metternichts rechte Hand
- Victor Kutschera as Fürsterzbischof Roncourt
- Fritz Strassny as Der Bader von Aussee

== Bibliography ==
- Von Dassanowsky, Robert (2005). Austrian Cinema: A History. McFarland. ISBN 978-1-4766-2147-0.
