= Seer (band) =

Austrian pop and schlager band

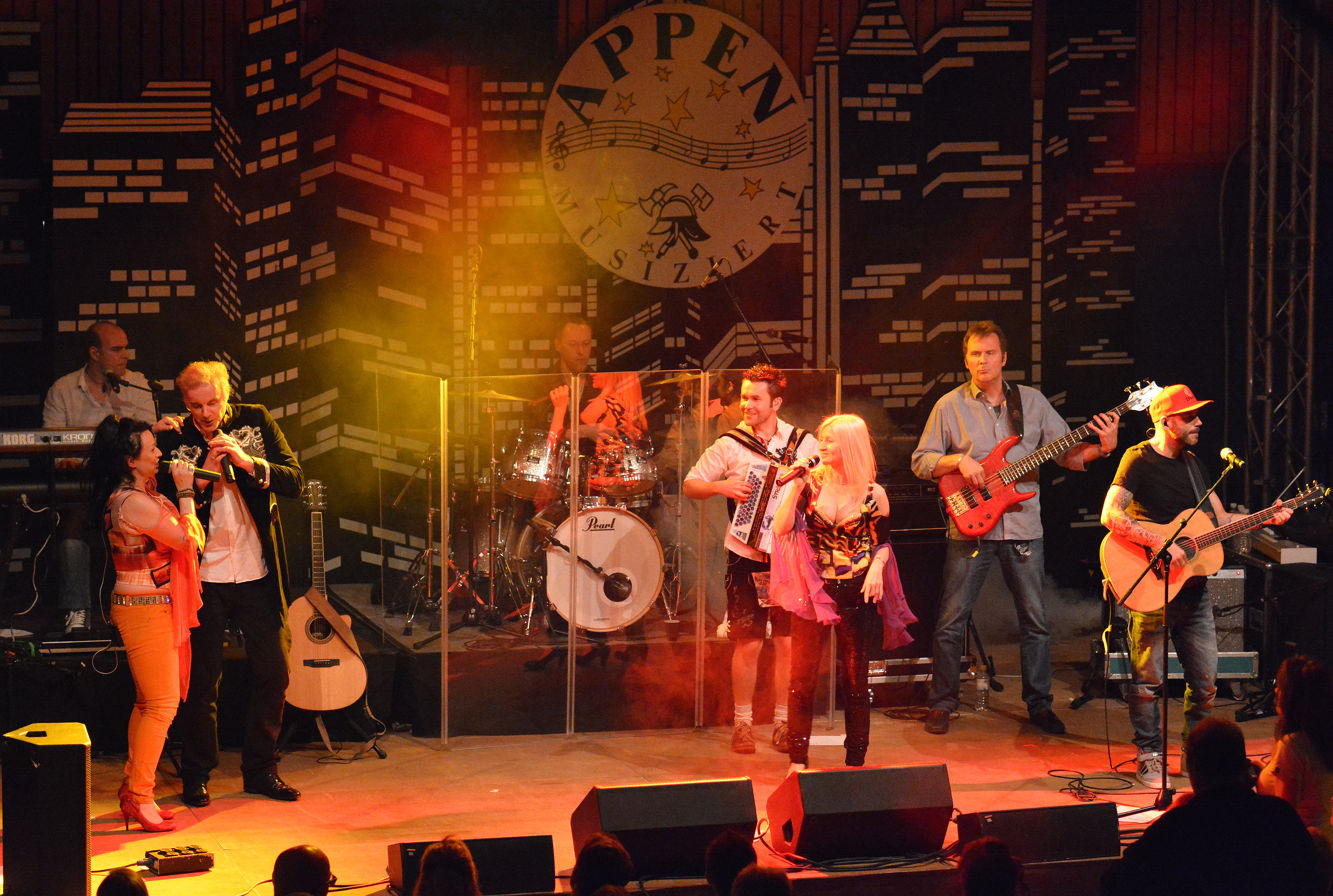
- Seer (2014)

Background information
- Origin: Grundlsee, Austria
- Genres: Schlager
- Years active: 1996–present
- Members: Alfred Fred Jaklitsch; Astrid Wirtenberger; Sabine Sassy Holzinger; Wolfgang Luckner; Jürgen Leitner; Thomas Eder; Dietmar Kastowsky; Mario Pecoraro
- Past members: Friedrich Spitz Hampel; Alois Huber; Manfred Temmel; Franz Rebensteiner; Klaus Neuper
- Website: www.dieseer.at

Seer or Die Seer is an Austrian musical pop and schlager band founded in 1996 by Alfred Fred Jaklitsch after the break-up of the Austrian pop band Joy he was part of. After a brief solo career as Freddy Jay, he founded the band that comes from Grundlsee in Styria, Salzkammergut region of Austria.

The band had a long string of album releases many reaching number 1 on the Austrian official charts. The band also had a number of hit singles. It won the Amadeus Austrian Music Award in the category Group Pop / Rock in 2003 followed in 2009, with another Amadeus Award win in the Schlager category.

== Members ==
The members have changed throughout the years.

Founding members

- Alfred Fred Jaklitsch – vocals, guitar
- Astrid Wirtenberger – vocals
- Sabine Sassy Holzinger – vocals
- Wolfgang Luckner – drums
- Friedrich Spitz Hampel – vocals (until 2012)
- Alois Huber – keyboards (until 2010)
- Manfred Temmel – E guitar (until 2008)
- Franz Rebensteiner – bass (until 2006)
- Klaus Neuper – Styrian harmonica (until 1999)

Present line-up

- Alfred Fred Jaklitsch – vocals, guitar
- Astrid Wirtenberger – vocals
- Sabine Sassy Holzinger – vocals
- Wolfgang Luckner – drums
- Jürgen Leitner – Styrian harmonica (since 1999)
- Thomas Eder – E guitar (since 2003)
- Dietmar Kastowsky – bass (since 2006)
- Mario Pecoraro – keyboards (since 2010)

== Discography ==
=== Albums ===
| Year | Album | Peak positions |
| Year | Album | AUT |
|---|---|---|
| 1996 | Über’n See | |
| 1998 | Auf + der Gams nach | |
| 1999 | Baff! | |
| 2000 | Baff! | |
| 2001 | Guats G’fühl | 26 |
| 2001 | Junischnee | 2 |
| 2003 | Aufwind | 2 |
| 2004 | Über’n Berg | 1 |
| 2004 | Lebensbaum (with Baumsamen) | 2 |
| 2006 | S’ Beste! (Double-CD) | 4 |
| 2006 | 1 Tog | 1 |
| 2009 | Hoffen, glauben, liab’n | 1 |
| 2010 | Wohlfühlgfühl | 1 |
| 2012 | Grundlsee | 1 |
| 2013 | Dahoam | 1 |
| 2014 | Echt seerisch | 1 |
| 2015 | Fesch | 1 |
| 2015 | Weihnacht | 4 |
| 2016 | Duette... bei uns dahoam! | 2 |
| 2017 | Des olls is Hoamat | 1 |
| 2019 | Analog | 1 |
| 2022 | Ring im See | 2 |
| 2022 | Stad | 1 |
| 2023 | Ausklang | 1 |

Compilations

- 2002: Das Beste (Wild’s Wasser)
- 2003: Das Beste 2
- 2006: Seerisch – Ihre größten Stimmungshits
- 2016: 20 Jahre – Nur das Beste!

Live albums

| Year | Album | Peak positions |
| Year | Album | AUT |
|---|---|---|
| 2008 | Live! – 10 Jahre Open Air Grundlsee (also DVD) | 3 |
| 2014 | Seer Jubiläums Open Air 2014 | 1 |

Special releases

- 2001: Gold (Double-CD Über’n See/Auf und der Gams nach)
- 2003: Gold Vol. 2 (Double-CD Baff!/Gössl)
- 2004: Über’n Berg (Limited Edition and bonus online song "I vermiß di")
- 2006: CD-Box Das Beste (albumsDas Beste/Das Beste 2/Das Beste 3)
- 2007: Junischnee Limited Edition of original and bonus tracks)
- 2007: Aufwind – Limited Edition of original and bonus tracks)

=== Videos ===
- 2005: Über’n Berg
- 2008: Live! – 10 Jahre Open Air Grundlsee

=== Maxi-CDs ===
- 1995: Jodlertrance
- 1997: Fix auf da Alm
- 1997: Iß mit mir
- 1997: Hey! Schäfer
- 1998: Kirtog
- 1999: A Wetta is immer und überall
- 2003: Es braucht 2
- 2005: Sun, Wind + Regen

=== Single-CDs ===
| Year | Single | Peak positions |
| Year | Single | AUT |
|---|---|---|
| 1999 | "Wild’s Wasser" | |
| 2000 | "Koane 10 Rösser" | |
| 2000 | "Sumaregn" | |
| 2000 | "Schene Weihnacht" | |
| 2001 | "Amerika gibt’s nit" | |
| 2001 | "2 ½ Sekunden" | |
| 2002 | "Eiskristall" | 22 |
| 2003 | "Es braucht 2" | 13 |
| 2005 | "Eiskristall (2005 Version)" | 22 |
| 2005 | "Sun, Wind + Regen" | 3 |
| 2013 | "Hoamatgfühl" | 37 |
| 2013 | "Wild's Wåsser" (rerelease) | 40 |
