= Franz, Count of Meran =

Austrian noble (1839–1891)

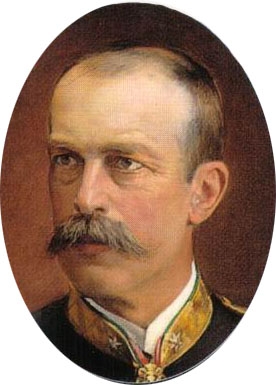
Franz, Count of Meran

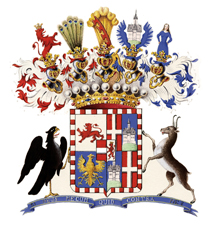
Coat of arms of the Count of Meran

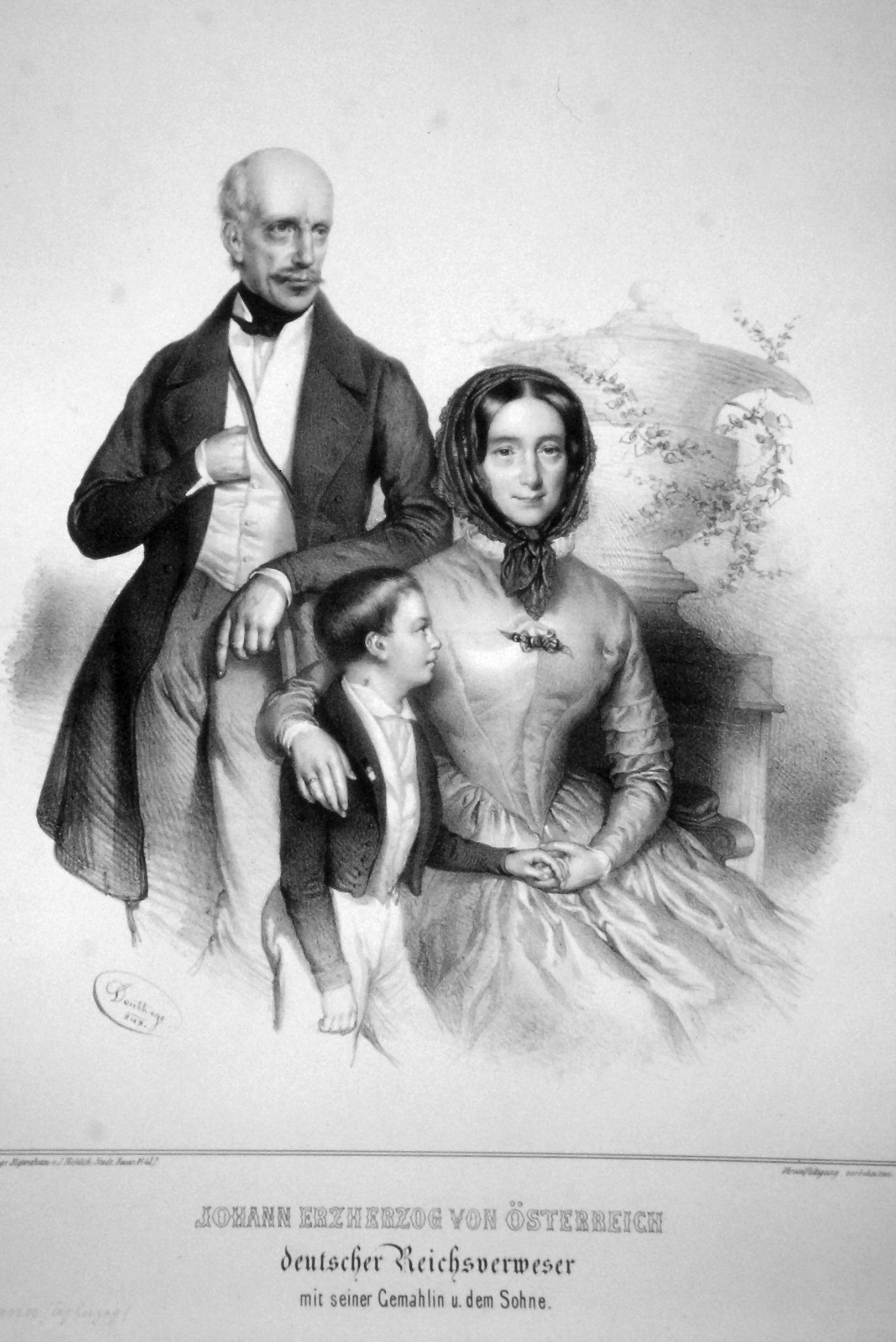
With his parents in 1848

Franz Ludwig Johann Baptist Count von Meran, Baron von Brandhofen (11 March 1839 – 27 March 1891) was an Austrian nobleman and courtier.

== Family ==
Born 11 March 1839, in Vienna, Franz was the only child of the morganatic marriage between Archduke John of Austria and Anna Plochl, and a grandson of the Holy Roman Emperor Leopold II. On 8 July 1862, at Ottenstein, he married Countess Theresia von Lamberg (1836–1913), the youngest daughter of Franz Philipp, Count von Lamberg and his wife, Countess Caroline Hoyos zu Stichsenstein. All members of the House of Meran descended from him.

== Life and career ==
His father having eloped with his mother (the daughter of a postmaster at Bad Aussee) in defiance of Archduke Johann's brother, Emperor Francis, Franz was entitled to inherit none of his father's positions or entailed possessions. However, the esteem in which his father was held by both emperor and nation as a general and patron of the arts shielded Franz from some of the scandal and consequences of the circumstances of his birth.

He was born legitimate but a commoner, and thus he was not permitted to bear the Habsburg-Lorraine surname of his father's dynasty. His mother had been ennobled by the emperor five years after her marriage to the archduke, becoming Baroness (Freifrau) von Brandhofen on 4 July 1834, and Franz shared in her title after his birth. He was raised to comital rank as Count (Graf) von Meran on 29 April 1844 (letters patent issuing 30 December 1845, Vienna).

While still a child, he had been designated a Landmann in Styria, Carinthia, Carniola, Tyrol and Austria, and was accorded a seat in the Austrian House of Lords on 24 November 1842. After his father's death in 1859 at Palais Meran in Graz, the manors of Schenna, Stainz and Gut Brandhof (near Mariazell) were combined into a fideicommis for him and his future descendants.

He served the Habsburg emperors as Imperial and Royal Chamberlain, member of the Aulic Council and as a general in the Imperial army, becoming in 1868 a knight of the Order of the Golden Fleece.

He died at Opatija, on 27 March 1891, aged 52.

== Descendants ==
Seven children were born from his marriage to Countess Theresia von Lamberg (1836–1913), and they bore the titles Count/Countess von Meran, Baron/Baroness von Brandhofen and inter-married with prominent families of the Austro-Hungarian nobility:

- Countess Anna Maria (1864–1935)
- Countess Maria Johanna (1865–1935)
- Johann Stephan, Count von Meran (1867–1947), who wed in 1891 his cousin, Countess Ladislaja von Lamberg with whom he had nine children; including Ladislaja Johanna Franziska; their grandchildren include conductor Count Nikolaus de la Fontaine und d'Harnoncourt-Unverzagt and politician Karl-Theodor, Baron von und zu Guttenberg
- Franz Peter (1868–1949), who in 1902 wed Princess Marie Johanna Franziska Sophie of Liechtenstein, daughter of Prince Louis and Princess Mary of Liechtenstein
- Countess Karoline Johanna (1870–1944)
- Count Rudolf Johann (1872–1959), who in 1917 wed Princess Johanna von Auersperg, granddaughter of Prince Adolf of Auersperg
- Count Albrecht Johann (1874–1928)

== Arms ==
Arms of the Counts of Meran granted to Anna Plochl in 1850

Arms of the Counts of Meran granted in 1845

== Ancestry ==
Ancestors of Franz, Count of Meran

Francis I, Holy Roman Emperor
Leopold II, Holy Roman Emperor
Maria Theresa of Austria
Archduke John of Austria
Charles III of Spain
Maria Luisa of Spain
Maria Amalia of Saxony
Franz, Count of Meran
Jakob Plochl
Jakob Plochl
Maria Lubsch
Anna Plochl
Johann Pilz
Maria Anna Pilz
Ehrentrud Fürst
