= Anna Plochl =

Austrian noblewomen (1804–1885)

Anna Maria Josephine Plochl
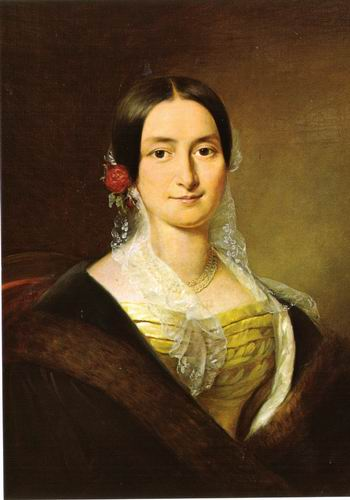
- Born: 6 January 1804; Gorlinzendorf bei Pettau or Bad Aussee, Duchy of Styria, Holy Roman Empire
- Died: 4 August 1885 (aged 81); Bad Aussee, Duchy of Styria, Austria-Hungary
- Spouse: Archduke John of Austria (m. 1829; died 1859)
- Children: Franz, Count of Meran

Anna Maria Josephine Plochl (6 January 1804 – 4 August 1885) was the morganatic wife of Archduke John of Austria. She was given the title Baroness von Brandhofen and then Countess von Meran. She and her husband were the parents of Franz, Count von Meran.

== Biography ==
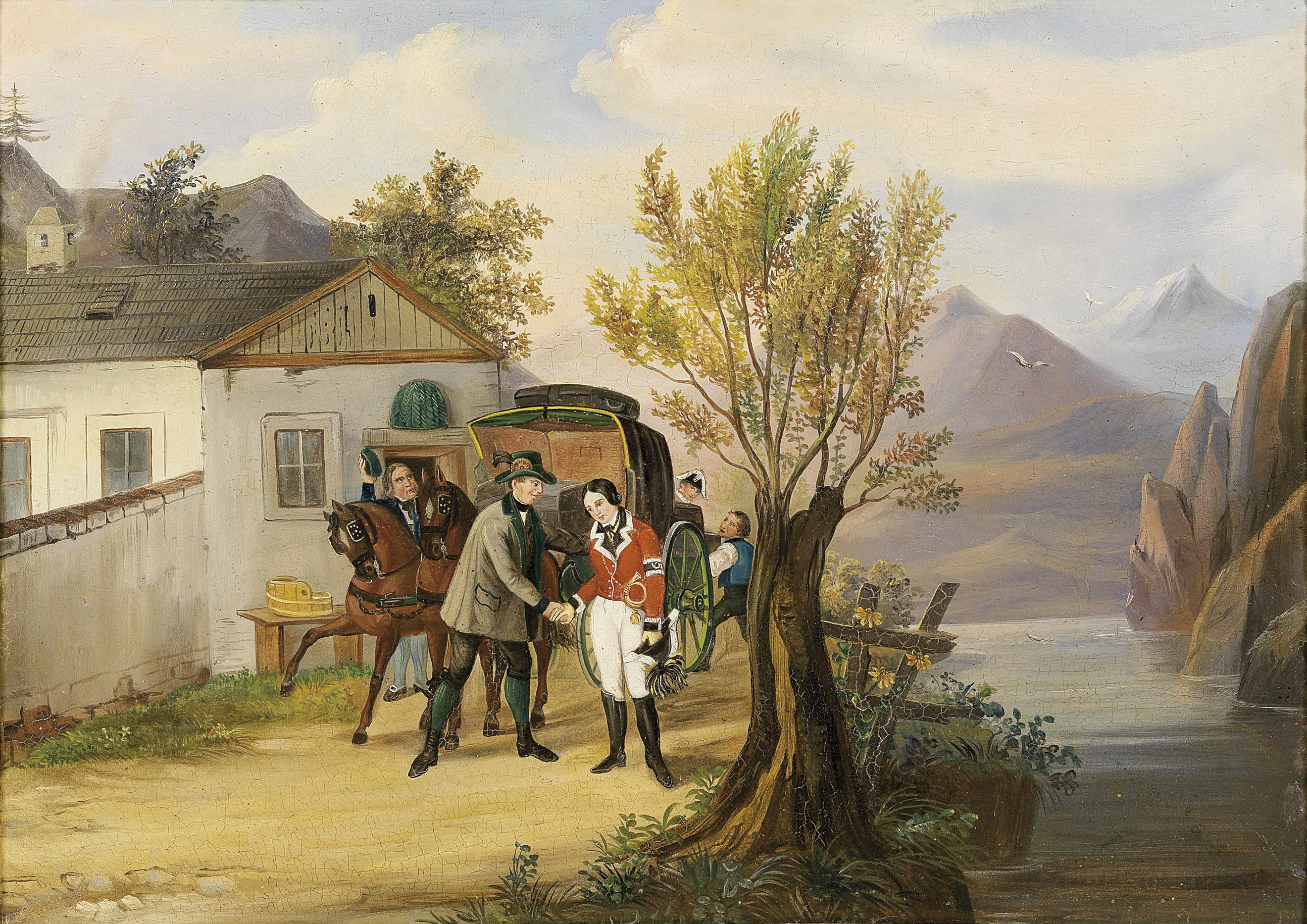
Erzherzog Johann und Anna Plochl vor dem Postmeistershaus am Grundlsee, 19th-century painting

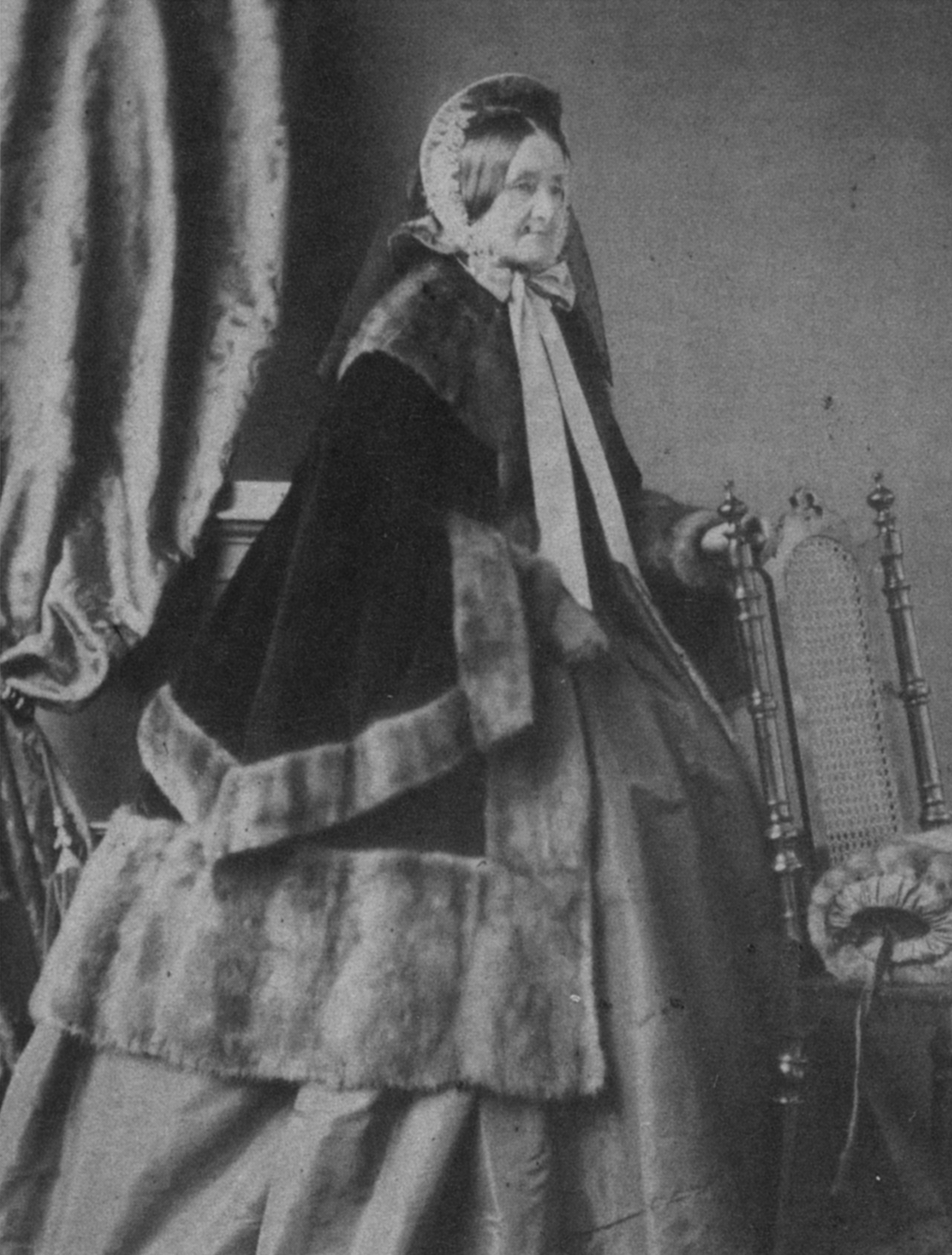
Photograph of Plochl, 1860s

She was born and grew up in Bad Aussee as the eldest of thirteen children of Jakob Plochl (Gorlinzendorf bei Pettau, 27 May 1774 - Bad Aussee, 25 April 1828), postmaster of Bad Aussee, and first wife (m. Bad Aussee, 31 May 1802) Maria Anna Ehrentrudis Pilz (Bad Aussee, 15 May 1782 - Bad Aussee, 21 January 1821), paternal granddaughter of Jakob Plochl and wife Maria Lubsch and maternal granddaughter of Johann Pilz (c. 1744 - Bad Aussee, 21 April 1792) and wife (m. Bad Aussee, 15 January 1776) Maria Ehrentrude Fürst (c. 1751 - Bad Aussee, 31 July 1806).

She met Archduke John in 1819, when a coach driver could not be procured to transport the archduke back to Vienna and she was disguised to look like a boy in order to fulfill the role. Archduke John, seeing through the ruse, was highly impressed by her vivaciousness and promised the girl, who disbelieved his claim to be the archduke, that he would return to see her and prove his credentials.

Archduke John not only kept his word, but he subsequently became a frequent visitor to the postmaster's residence in order to court the commoner. Fearing a scandal, she attempted to break off the relationship, but instead he declared her as his intended fiancée.

Archduke John asked his brother, Emperor Francis, for permission to marry her, which was denied. Approval for a morganatic marriage was granted eleven years later. They were married on 3 September 1829 at the Bad Aussee church.

Despite royal misgivings, she was given the properties of Stainz and Brandhof and the title Baroness von Brandhofen after the marriage on 4 July 1834, and she was elevated to the higher title of Countess von Meran on 29 April 1844 with letters patent issued from Vienna of 30 December 1845. However, the great disparity in social rank caused a rift between Archduke John and his family, to the point that the couple was refused entry to court.

Her positive attributes were such that she eventually earned a grudging respect within court circles. Within general society circles, she was held in much higher regard, having been described as a society "queen".

They had one son, Franz, Count of Meran.

A 1929 film entitled Archduke John and a 1950 film entitled Erzherzog Johanns große Liebe are about the romance between her and Archduke John. A number of her portraits are found in the Kammerhof museum in Bad Aussee.

== Arms ==
Arms of the Barons of Brandhofen granted to Anna Plochl and her descendants in 1834	Arms of the Counts of Meran granted to Anna Plochl in 1850
Arms of the Barons of Brandhofen granted to Anna Plochl and her descendants in 1834	Arms of the Counts of Meran granted to Anna Plochl in 1850
