= Albrecht Gaiswinkler =

Austrian politician (1905–1979)

Member of the Austrian Parliament for Bad Aussee
- In office 19 December 1945 – 8 November 1949

Personal details
- Born: 29 October 1905 Bad Aussee, Austria
- Died: 11 May 1979 (aged 73) Bad Aussee, Austria
- Party: Socialist Party of Austria (SPÖ)

Albrecht Gaiswinkler (29 October 1905 – 11 May 1979) was an Austrian civil servant, social democrat (SPÖ) politician and resistance fighter, who, some believe, saved a copy of the Mona Lisa from destruction in an Austrian salt mine towards the end of World War II.

Gaiswinkler was born in Bad Aussee, Austria. In 1934, he was a political prisoner for some months. In 1944, while serving with the German Wehrmacht in France, he deserted and joined the Maquis, bringing with him four trucks of arms and ammunition and 500,000 francs. When the U.S. Third Army liberated Alsace in September 1944, he gave himself up to them (along with 17 German prisoners). He then went to work for the British Special Operations Executive and, in 1945, he was parachuted back into the Aussee area with three colleagues: Valentin Tarra, Johann Moser and Hans Renner.

The Germans had pillaged a huge number of European art treasures during the Nazi period, and many had been stored in the Altaussee salt mine near Gaiswinkler's home town of Bad Aussee. After being dropped into the local area, Gaiswinkler raised a force of around 300 men and armed them with captured German weapons. He spent the last weeks and months of the war harassing local German forces. When the Americans arrived, his information helped them capture several eminent Nazis. He and his colleagues had captured the salt mine, prevented the destruction of the artworks held there and were able to hand over "a number of Nazi treasure hoards, including the Mona Lisa and the Austrian Imperial Crown Jewels". Other artworks rescued included the Ghent Altarpiece.

The administrators of the Louvre have stated that the Mona Lisa was kept in France during the Second World War, but that it is possible that a 15th- or 16th-century copy was held in Austria.

After the war, Gaiswinkler was a SPÖ member of the Austrian Parliament from 1945 to 1949. He died in Bad Aussee in 1979.
