= Schloss Stainz =

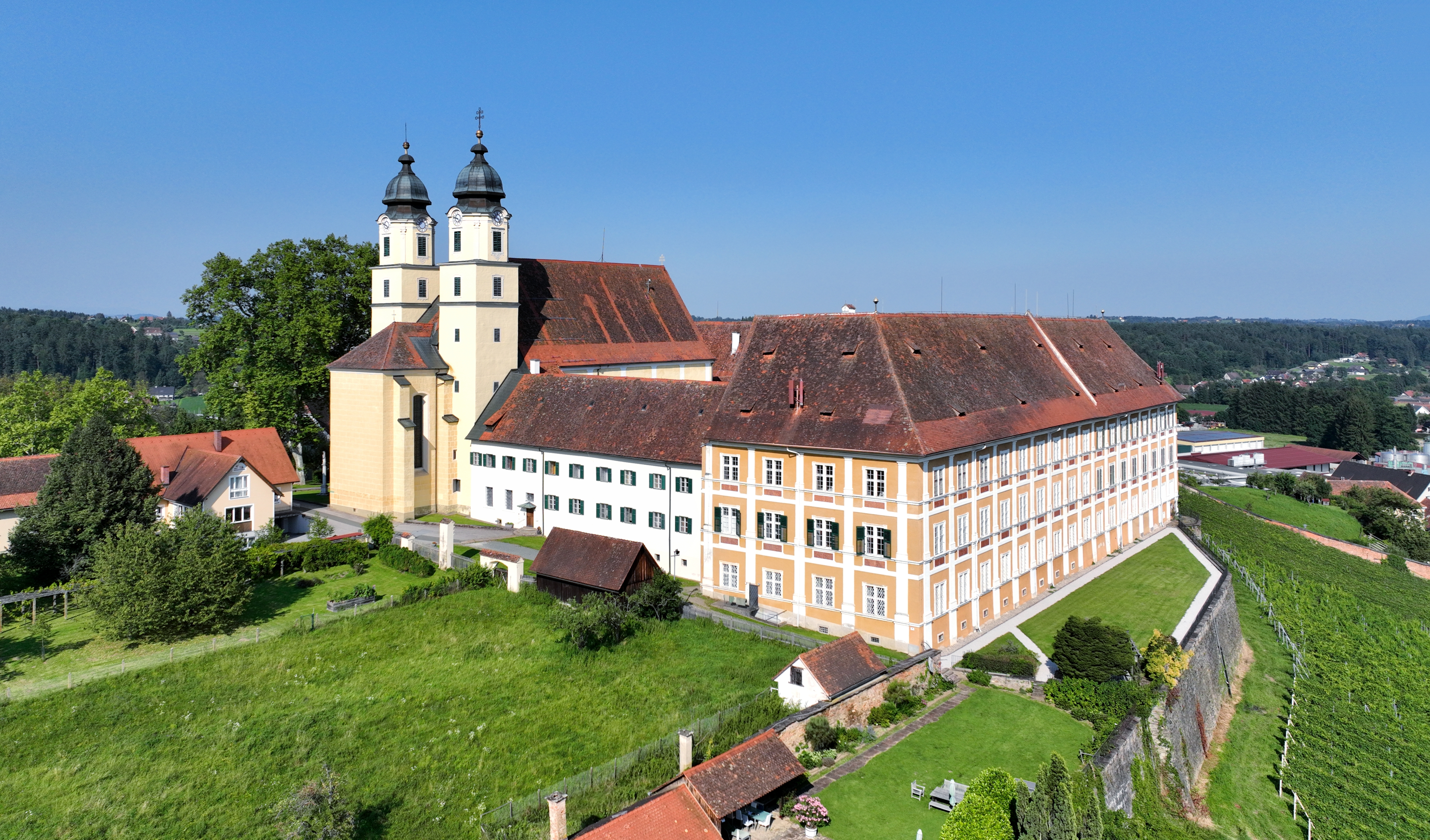
- Southwest view of Stainz Castle
- Interactive map of the Schloss Stainz area

General information
- Type: Schloss
- Architectural style: Gothic and Baroque
- Location: Stainz, Styria, Austria
- Coordinates: 46.896325°N 15.263653°E
- Current tenants: Hunting Museum and Museum of Agriculture and Forestry of the Joanneum
- Construction started: 1229 (medieval construction), 1695 (Baroque construction)
- Completed: 1730
- Owner: Counts of Meran

Technical details
- Floor count: 3
- Floor area: 3,000 m^{2}

Design and construction
- Other designers: Matthias Echer; Carlo Formentini

Schloss Stainz is a former monastery in Stainz, located in the Austrian state of Styria. Today, the Baroque complex belongs to the Counts of Meran and hosts two museum collections from the Universal Museum Joanneum.

== History ==
Stainz Priory (German: Stift Stainz) was a monastery founded by the Augustinian Canons in 1229, when Leutold I von Wildon, lord of the manor of Stainz, allowed a small church with a monastery attached to be established on the mountain where his castle stood. The monastery was settled by canons regular from Seckau Priory.

The priory experienced its heyday during the early 16th century under provost Jakob Roselenz (1596–1629), under whom the community was reorganised and the church, previously neglected, was enlarged. The interior was later refurbished in the Baroque style, with extensive stucco decoration. The church organ counts among the largest and most melodious in Styria and was restored in 1980.

The monastery was dissolved in 1785 as part of the rationalist reforms of the Emperor Joseph II. The church however remained in use.

In 1840, Archduke Johann, son of Emperor Leopold II and an avid hunter, purchased the building complex from the town for the sum of 40,000 guilders for use as a hunting lodge, known thereafter as Schloss Stainz. Since his death in 1859, it has remained in the family estate of his descendants, the Counts of Meran.

== Present day ==
Today, besides offering gardens and rooms to rent for engagements, the castle houses two collections from the Universal Museum Joanneum. On 16 September 2006, the Steirisches Jagdmuseum ("Styrian Hunting Museum") was opened. The interdisciplinary approach of this collection combines contemporary technology with historic equipment, weapons and specimens to explore the historical, sociological and anthropological, as well as the philosophical and ethical, phenomena of the human practice of hunting, in addition to wildlife ecology.

In 2009, the Landwirtschaftsmuseum ("Museum of Agriculture and Forestry") also opened, displaying collections of rural Styrian folk culture. The main focus of the exhibition is on the agricultural implements and the household effects of the Styrian countryside from the Stone Age to the present. The exhibition displays objects related to the different branches of agriculture and husbandry, and it offers a fitting companion to the Hunting Museum.

In addition to the two permanent exhibitions of the Joanneum, areas of the castle, for example the courtyard, the cellar, the arcades and the terrace, are also rented out for private events.
