= Joseph Hormayr, Baron zu Hortenburg =

Politician from Austria (1781–1848)

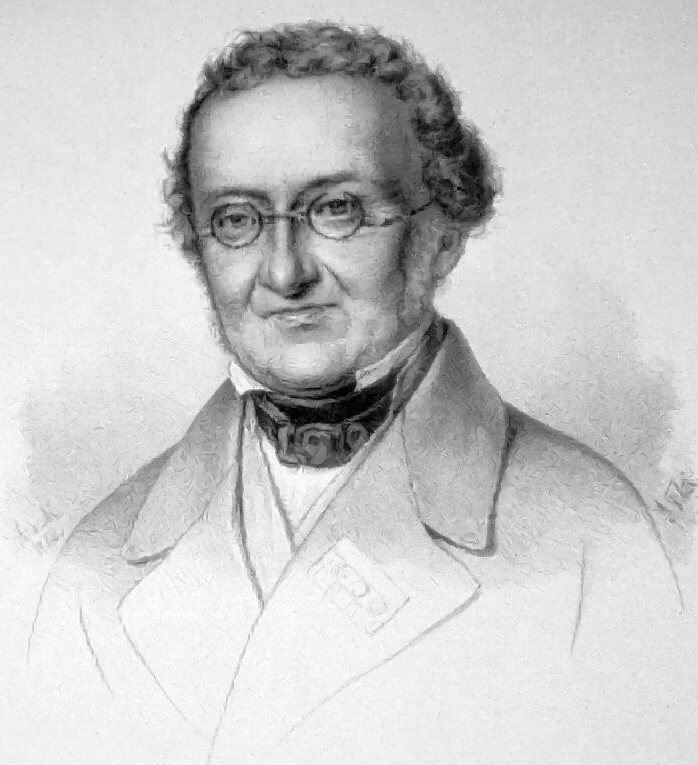
Josef Freiherr von Hormayr, 1850

Joseph Hormayr, Baron zu Hortenburg (German: Joseph Hormayr Freiherr zu Hortenburg, also known as Joseph Freiherr von Hormayr zu Hortenburg) (20 January 1781 – 5 November 1848) was an Austrian and German statesman and historian.

== Biography ==
Hormayr was born at Innsbruck. After studying law in his native town, and attaining the rank of captain in the Tirolese Landwehr, the young man, who had the advantage of being the grandson of Joseph von Hormayr (1705–1778), chancellor of Tirol, obtained a post in the foreign office at Vienna (1801), from which he rose in 1803 to be court secretary and, being a near friend of the Archduke Johann of Austria, director of the secret archives of the state and court for thirteen months. In 1803 he married Theresia von Hohenwald.

During the insurrection of 1809, by which the Tirolese sought to throw off the Bavarian supremacy confirmed by the treaty of Pressburg, Hormayr was the mainstay of the Austrian party, and assumed the administration of everything (especially the composition of proclamations and pamphlets); but, returning home without the prestige of success, he fell, in spite of the help of the Archduke John, into disfavour both with the emperor Francis II, Holy Roman Emperor and with Prince Metternich, and at length, when in 1813 he tried to stir up a new insurrection in Tirol, he was arrested and imprisoned at Mukachevo.

In 1816, some amends were made to him by his appointment as imperial historiographer; but so little was he satisfied with the general policy and conduct of the Austrian court that in 1828 he accepted an invitation of King Louis I to the Bavarian capital, where he became ministerial councilor in the department of foreign affairs.

In 1832 he was appointed Bavarian minister-resident at Hanover, and from 1837 to 1846 he held the same position at Bremen. Together with Count Johann Friedrich von der Decken (1769–1840) he founded the Historical Society of Lower Saxony (Historischer Verein für Niedersachsen). The last two years of his life were spent at Munich as superintendent of the national archives.

He was elected to the American Philosophical Society in 1820.

He died in October 1848 of unknown causes, aged 67, in Munich.

== Posthumous assessment ==
Hormayr's literary activity was closely conditioned by the circumstances of his political career and by the fact that Johannes von Müller (died 1811) was his teacher: while his access to original documents gave value to his treatment of the past, his record or criticism of contemporary events received authority and interest from his personal experience. But his history of the Tirolese rebellion is far from being impartial; for he always liked to put himself into the first place, and the merits of Andreas Hofer and of other leaders are not sufficiently acknowledged. In his later writings he appears as a keen opponent of the policy of the court of Vienna.

== Works ==
The following are among Hormayr's more important works:

- Geschichte des Grafen von Andechs (1796)
- Lexikon für Reisenden in Tirol (1796)
- Kritisch-diplomatische Beiträge zur Geschichte Tirols im Mittelalter (2 vols., Innsbruck, 1802–1803, new ed., 1805)
- Geschichte der gefürsteten Grafschaft Tirol (2 vols., Tübingen, 1806–1808);
- Österreichischer Plutarch, 20 vols., collection of portraits and biographies of the most celebrated administrators, commanders and statesmen of Austria (Vienna. 1807)
- an edition of Beauchamp's Histoire de la guerre en Vendée (1809)
- Geschichte Hofers (1817, 2nd edition, 2 vols. 1845) and other pamphlets
- Archiv für Gesch., Stat., Lit. und Kunst (20 vols., 1809–1828)
- Allgemeine Geschichte der neuesten Zeit vom Tod Friedrichs des Grossen bis zum zweiten Pariser Frieden (3 vols., Vienna, 1814–1819, 2nd edition, 1891)
- Wien, seine Gesch. und Denkwürdigkeiten (5 vols., Vienna, 1823–1824)
- Fragmente über Deutschland, in Sondertheil Bayerns Welthandel, Lebensbilder aus dem Befreiungskriege (3 vols., Jena, 1841–1844, 2nd edition, 1845)
- Die goldene Chronik von Hohenschwangau (Munich, 1842)
- Anemonen aus dem Tagebuch eines alten Pilgersmanns (4 vols., Jena 1845–1847)

Together with Mednyanski (1784–1844) he founded the Taschenbuch für die vaterländ. Gesch. (Vienna, 1811–1848).
