= Bad Aussee =

Bad Aussee Bod Ossee
- Municipality
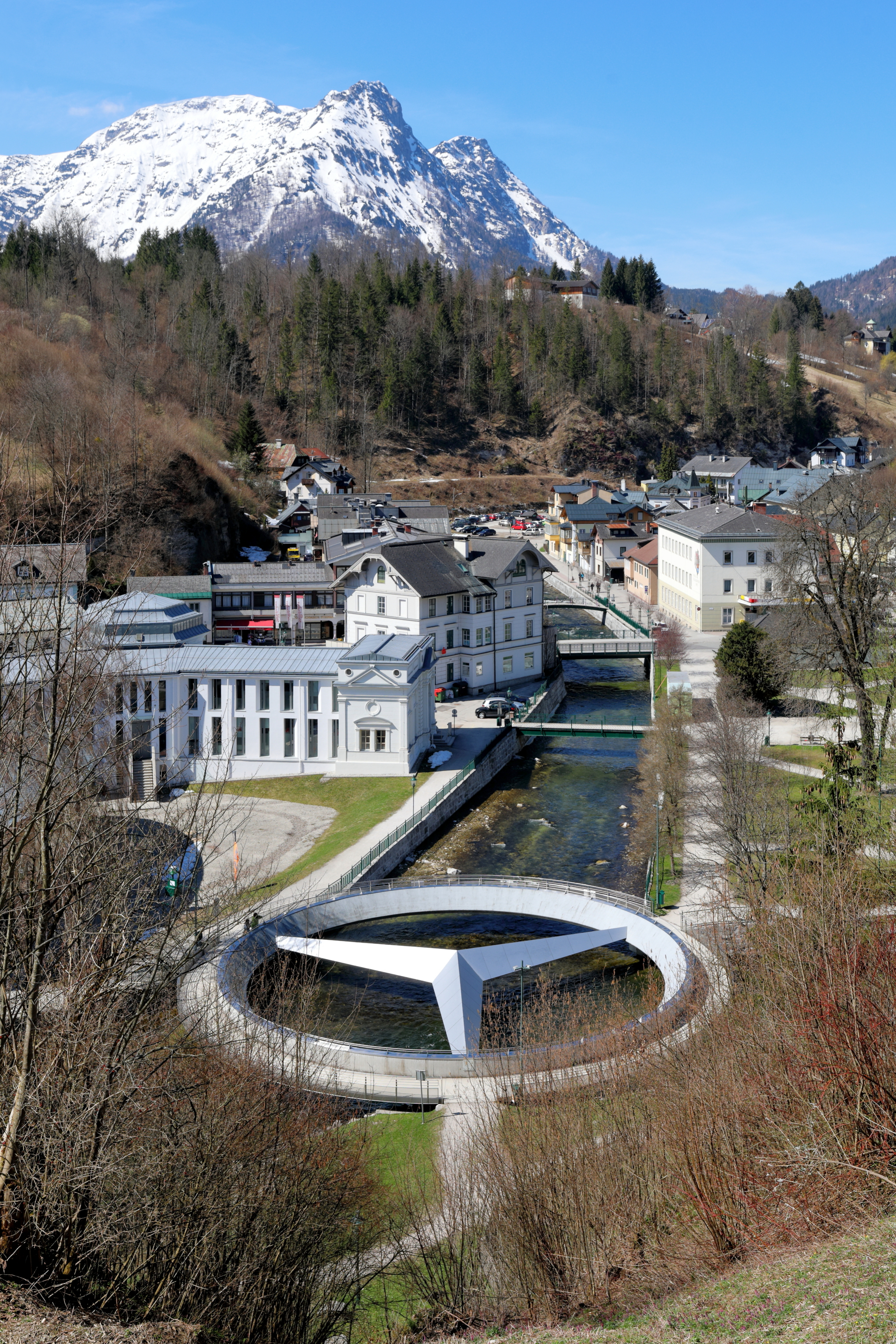
- Mercedes Bridge

- Coat of arms

- Location within Bad Aussee Bad Aussee (Styria)
- Coordinates: 47°36′36″N 13°46′58″E
- Country: Austria
- State: Styria
- District: Liezen

Government
  - Mayor: Franz Frosch (ÖVP)

Area
  - Total: 82.03 km^{2} (31.67 sq mi)
- Elevation: 659 m (2,162 ft)

Population (2018-01-01)
  - Total: 4,833
  - Density: 58.92/km^{2} (152.6/sq mi)
- Time zone: UTC+1 (CET)
  - Summer (DST): UTC+2 (CEST)
- Postal code: 8990
- Area code: +43 3622
- Vehicle registration: LI
- Website: www.badaussee.at

Bad Aussee (German: [baːt aʊ̯sˈseː]; Central Bavarian: Bod Ossee) is a town in the Austrian state of Styria, located at the confluence of the three sources of the Traun River in the Ausseerland region. Bad Aussee serves as the economic and cultural center of the Styrian part of the Salzkammergut lakes region. With a population of 4,862, the town is said to be the geographical midpoint of Austria, symbolized by a stone monument in the centre of town.

Together with other Alpine towns Bad Aussee engages in the Alpine Town of the Year Association for the implementation of the Alpine Convention to achieve sustainable development in the Alpine Arc. Bad Aussee was awarded Alpine Town of the Year 2010.

== History ==
Prehistoric artifacts were discovered in the nearby Salzofenhöhle cave. The town began to flourish in the Middle Ages, when salt works started operating in the late thirteenth century. Bad Aussee was designated a market town in 1295. The Romanesque and late Gothic Stadtpfarrkirche St. Paul (parish church) dates from the thirteenth century and contains a Gothic Madonna from 1420. The sacrament house dates from 1523. The Spitalkirche (hospital church) on Meranplatz square was erected before 1395 and contains two Gothic altarpieces with movable wings from the fifteenth century and frescoes.

Other important historical buildings include the Kammerhof, which was built before 1200. Until 1926, it housed the salt administration for the region. Charming houses that date from the fifteenth century surround the Kurpark and the harmonious center of town. Bad Aussee was the birthplace of Anna Plochl, a postman's daughter who became the wife of Archduke Johann of Austria, whose economic, cultural, and educational impact on Styria and the Salzkammergut is still remembered by the people. A statue of the beloved archduke stands in the centre of the Kurpark in Bad Aussee.

The town was built up and around the salt industry.

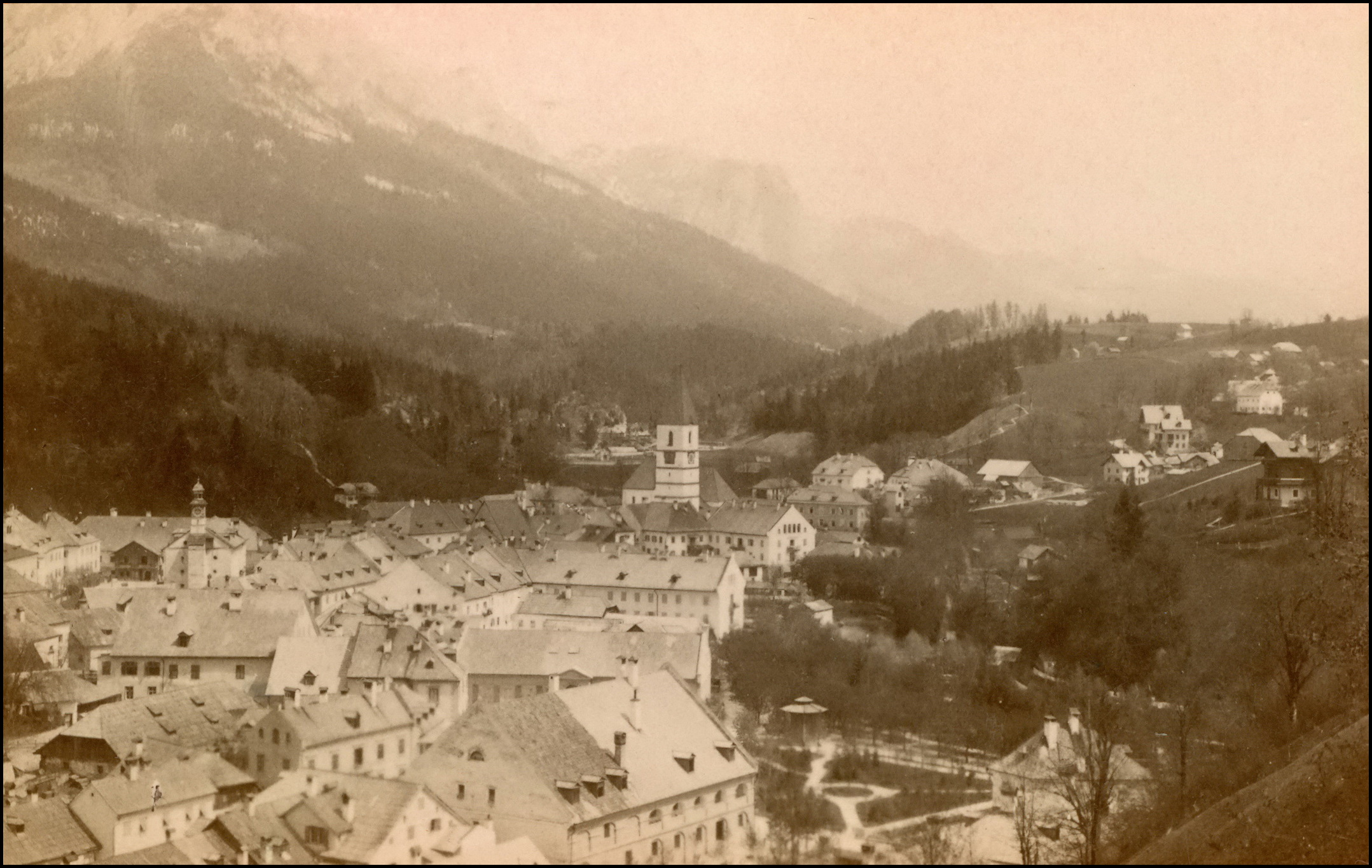
Bad Aussee in 1892

== Tourism ==
Today, the town's primary focus is on culture and tourism. Bad Aussee has a regional museum, the Kammerhofmuseum, which has exhibits covering local traditions and customs, the salt trade and a collection of fossils found in the region. There is also a spa in the city centre, Vital Bad Aussee, that offers medicinal brine baths and the Kneipp Cure therapy, which was invented by the German priest Sebastian Kneipp. This therapy combines cold-water treatment, diets, and outdoor exercise. The town also sponsors a music festival that runs for several weeks in the spring of each year, called the Ausseer Jazzfrühling.

There are two ski regions accessible from Bad Aussee: Loser and Tauplitz. The Loser Ski Region overlooks the Dachstein Glacier and has been recently modernized. At the Tauplitz Ski Region, visitors can also go cross-country skiing or sledding in the evening.

== Lakes ==
There are five lakes nearby Bad Aussee.

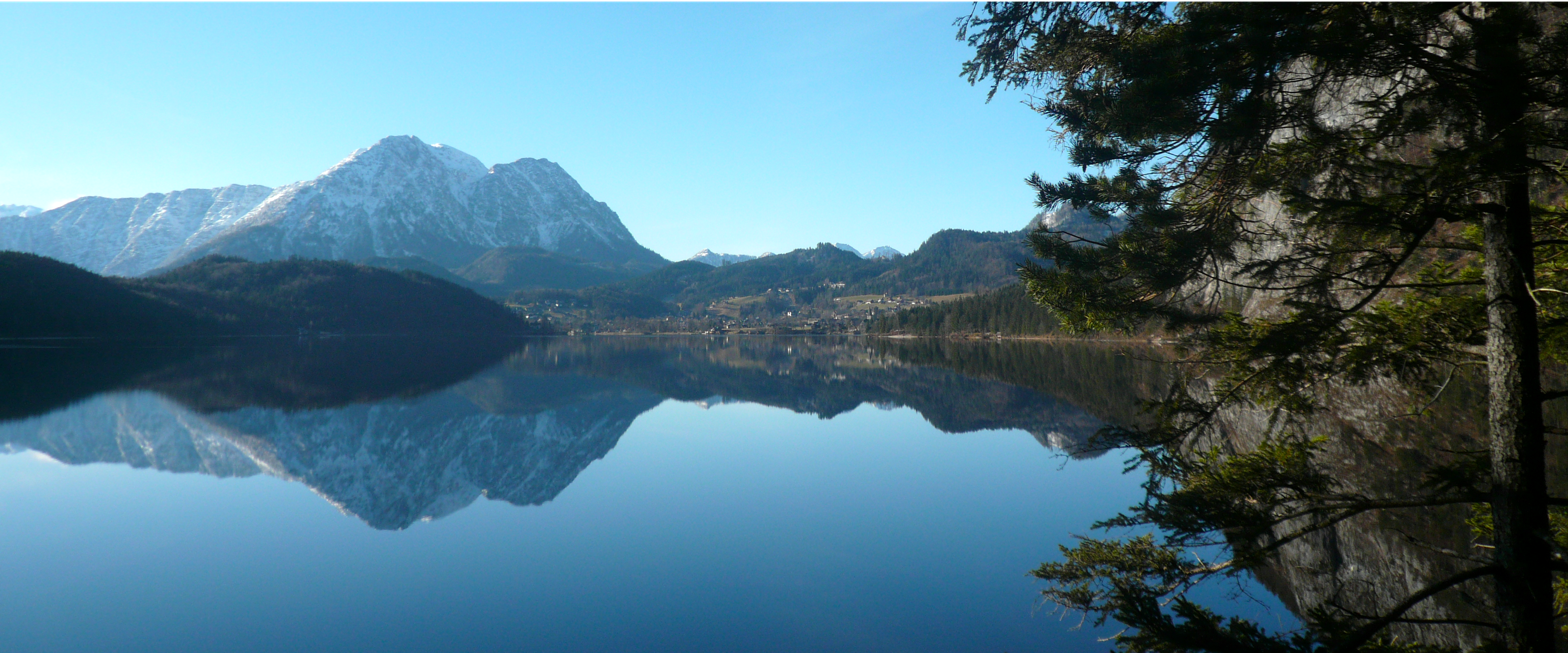
The Lake Altaussee

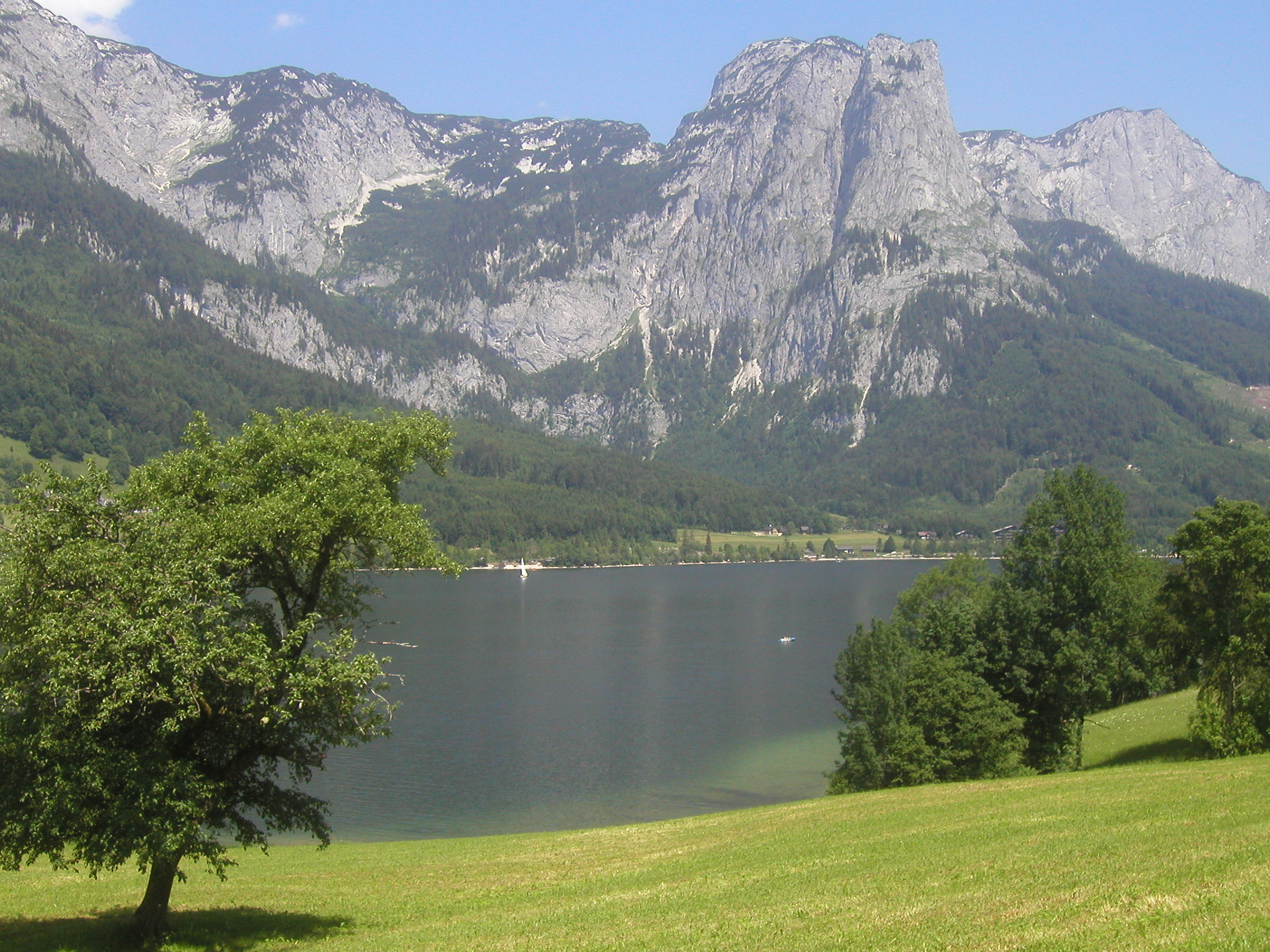
The Lake Grundlsee

Lake Altaussee (German: Altausseer See) is located at the foot of the Loser mountain. There is a footpath encircling the lake and the village of Altaussee rests on its shores.

Sommersbergersee is a smaller lake, which is not as deep as the other bodies of water in the region and is, as such, suitable for swimming at a much earlier date every year.

Lake Grundlsee, sometimes called das Steirische Meer (the Styrian Sea), is the largest lake in the state of Styria. At Grundlsee, electric boats are available to rent and there are public beaches around it. Grundlsee is fed by two smaller lakes, Lake Toplitz (German: Toplitzsee) and Kammersee.

Toplitzsee, where the Nazis both tested weapons and allegedly dumped counterfeited currency, is the source of much local lore in the region. It is unique in that it has two layers of water, an upper one composed of fresh water and one beneath it made of salt water.

Kammersee is designated as the origin of the River Traun and can only be reached by boat from the Toplitzsee. A small business offers guided tours to Kammersee in so-called Plätten, a flat-bottomed boat unique to the region, that were once used in the salt trade. During the reign of Maria Theresa, convicts chiseled an opening in the stone separating Kammersee from Toplitzsee in order to aid in the transportation of lumber.

== Culture and traditions ==
=== Fasching ===
The biggest yearly event in Bad Aussee occurs on Faschingsdienstag (Shrove Tuesday), when the Flinserln dress up in sequined costumes and parade through town to announce the coming of spring. Children recite old rhymes to the Flinserln and are rewarded with nuts or sweets. The Flinserln are accompanied by the Zacharin, who keep spectators in line by waving pig bladders on the ends of sticks and occasionally rapping people on the head with them. The celebration is rounded off by the Trommelweiber (Drum Women). The Trommelweiber are a group of men dressed in women's nightgowns, who go from inn to inn banging on drums, pots and pans, and enjoy the free food and beer. According to the tale, the tradition of the Trommelweiber was initiated in the last century as a way for men who frequented pubs to poke fun at their wives: at the time, women were not allowed in such establishments and often resorted to banging on pots and pans outside of the premises in order to get their husbands to come out, come home and dry up. Inns, pubs and restaurants are heavily frequented during the Heilige Drei Faschingstage (the three 'holy' days of Fasching) by costumed revelers known as Maschgera.

=== Narzissenfest ===
Bad Aussee's other major yearly event is the Narzissenfest (Narcissus Festival). Every spring, on the last weekend in May, participants construct massive floral sculptures made from daffodil blossoms, and parade them through town on large floats, accompanied by regional folk music. Some of these floral sculptures are later displayed along the shores of Grundlsee or Altausseersee, alternating from one year to the next.

=== Glöckler und Berigeln ===
Another local custom takes place on 5 January. During the day, children, called Glöckler, go door to door with little bells and sacks and receive Faschingskrapfen (donuts), oranges, chocolate or nuts. In the evening, it's the adults' turn! They take to the streets dressed as Berigeln, in raggedy traditional dress clothes, their faces covered with a black cloth mask. They carry with them large cow bells, with which they announce their arrival in front of those who open their homes to the Berigeln. Once the Berigeln enter a home, they refrain from speaking in order to conceal their identity. Usually the host tries to guess their identity, as they proceed to fill them up with home-made schnapps, beer, Faschingskrapfen, and other foods.

Bad Aussee

Climate chart (precipitation, max. and min. temperature)
J	F	M	A	M	J	J	A	S	O	N	D
111 2 −6	82 5 −5	112 9 −1	96 13 2	121 19 7	181 21 10	212 23 11	167 24 11	129 20 8	88 15 4	110 7 −1	124 3 −4
- █ Average max. and min. temperatures in °C
- █ Precipitation totals in mm
- Source: ZAMG
Imperial conversion
J	F	M	A	M	J	J	A	S	O	N	D
4.4 36 21	3.2 41 23	4.4 48 30	3.8 55 36	4.8 66 45	7.1 70 50	8.3 73 52	6.6 75 52	5.1 68 46	3.5 59 39	4.3 45 30	4.9 37 25
- █ Average max. and min. temperatures in °F
- █ Precipitation totals in inches

== Tracht ==
Bad Aussee is unique within Austria as its inhabitants wear Tracht (traditional dress) on a daily basis. For women, this consists of a Dirndl, a type of dress with a fitted bodice and full skirt. Many women choose to wear an Ausseerdirndl, which has a green bodice, a rose-colored skirt and a purple apron.

== Notable people ==
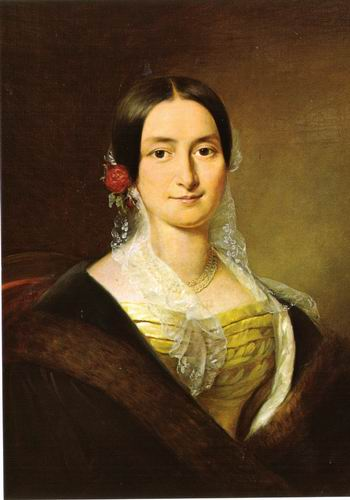
Anna Plochl

- Klaus Maria Brandauer (born 1943), Austrian actor and director
- Gunther Burstyn (1879–1945), inventor, technician, and Army officer, helped develop the modern tank
- Marianne Feldhammer (1909–1996), an Austrian resistance activist during the Nazi years.
- Barbara Frischmuth (1941–2025), Austrian writer of poetry and prose.
- Albrecht Gaiswinkler (1905–1979), Austrian, politician (SPÖ) and resistance fighter, said to have saved a copy of the Mona Lisa
- Alfred Komarek (1945–2024), Austrian writer
- Manfred Nowak (born 1950), an Austrian human rights expert, the UN Special Rapporteur on Torture, 2004 to 2010.
- Anna Plochl (1804–1885), the morganatic wife of Archduke John of Austria.
- Paul Preuss (1886–1913) an Austrian alpinist
- Ulla Weigerstorfer (born 1967), an Austrian tv host, model and Miss World 1987

Music

- Ausseer Hardbradler (formed 1993), reggae band
- Joy (formed 1984), eurodisco group
