= Archduke John of Austria =

Austrian soldier; imperial regent of the German Empire (1848 to 1849)

Archduke John
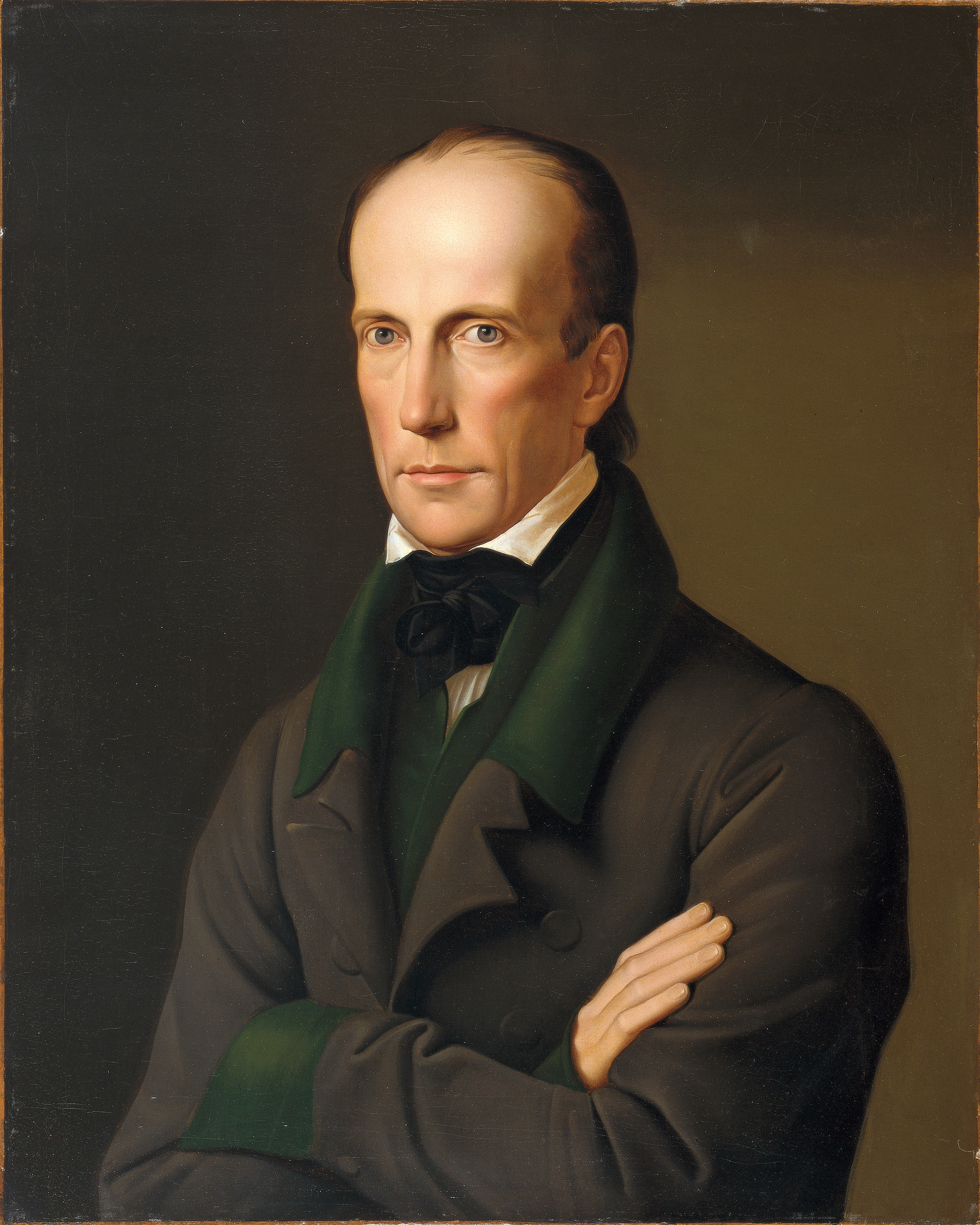
- Portrait by Leopold Kupelwieser, 1828

Imperial Regent of the German Empire
- In office: 12 July 1848 – 20 December 1849
- Predecessor: Ferdinand I of Austria (President of the German Confederation)
- Successor: Francis Joseph I of Austria (President of the German Confederation)
- Born: 20 January 1782; Florence, Grand Duchy of Tuscany
- Died: 11 May 1859 (aged 77); Graz, Styria, Austrian Empire
- Burial: Schenna Castle, Tyrol
- Spouse: Anna Maria Josephine Plochl (m. 1829)
- Issue: Franz, Count of Meran
- House: Habsburg-Lorraine
- Father: Leopold II, Holy Roman Emperor
- Mother: Maria Luisa of Spain
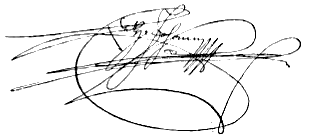
- Signature
- Military career
- Allegiance: Austria
- Branch: Army of the Holy Roman Empire / Imperial Army of the Holy Roman Emperor; Imperial Austrian Army (1806–1867)
- Conflicts: War of the Second Coalition; • Battle of Ampfing; • Battle of Hohenlinden; War of the Fifth Coalition; • Battle of Sacile; • Battle of Caldiero; • Battle of Piave River; • Battle of Raab
- Awards: See § Honours

Archduke John of Austria (German: Erzherzog Johann Baptist Joseph Fabian Sebastian von Österreich, IPA: [ˈɛʁt͡sˌheʁt͡sok ˈjoːhan]; Slovene: Nadvojvoda Janez Habsburško-Lotarinški (or simply Nadvojvoda Janez); 20 January 1782 – 11 May 1859), a member of the House of Habsburg-Lorraine, was an Austrian field marshal and imperial regent (Reichsverweser) of the short-lived German Empire during the Revolutions of 1848.

== Biography ==
John was born in Florence, the thirteenth child of the Habsburg Grand Duke Leopold I of Tuscany (Archduke of Austria and later Emperor) and Maria Luisa of Spain. He was baptized with the name of John Baptist Joseph Fabian Sebastian, after the patron saint of the Tuscan capital. In 1790, Leopold succeeded his brother Joseph II as the Holy Roman Emperor and his family moved from the Grand Duchy of Tuscany to the Imperial court in Vienna. Only two years later, John's elder brother Francis II ascended the Imperial throne.

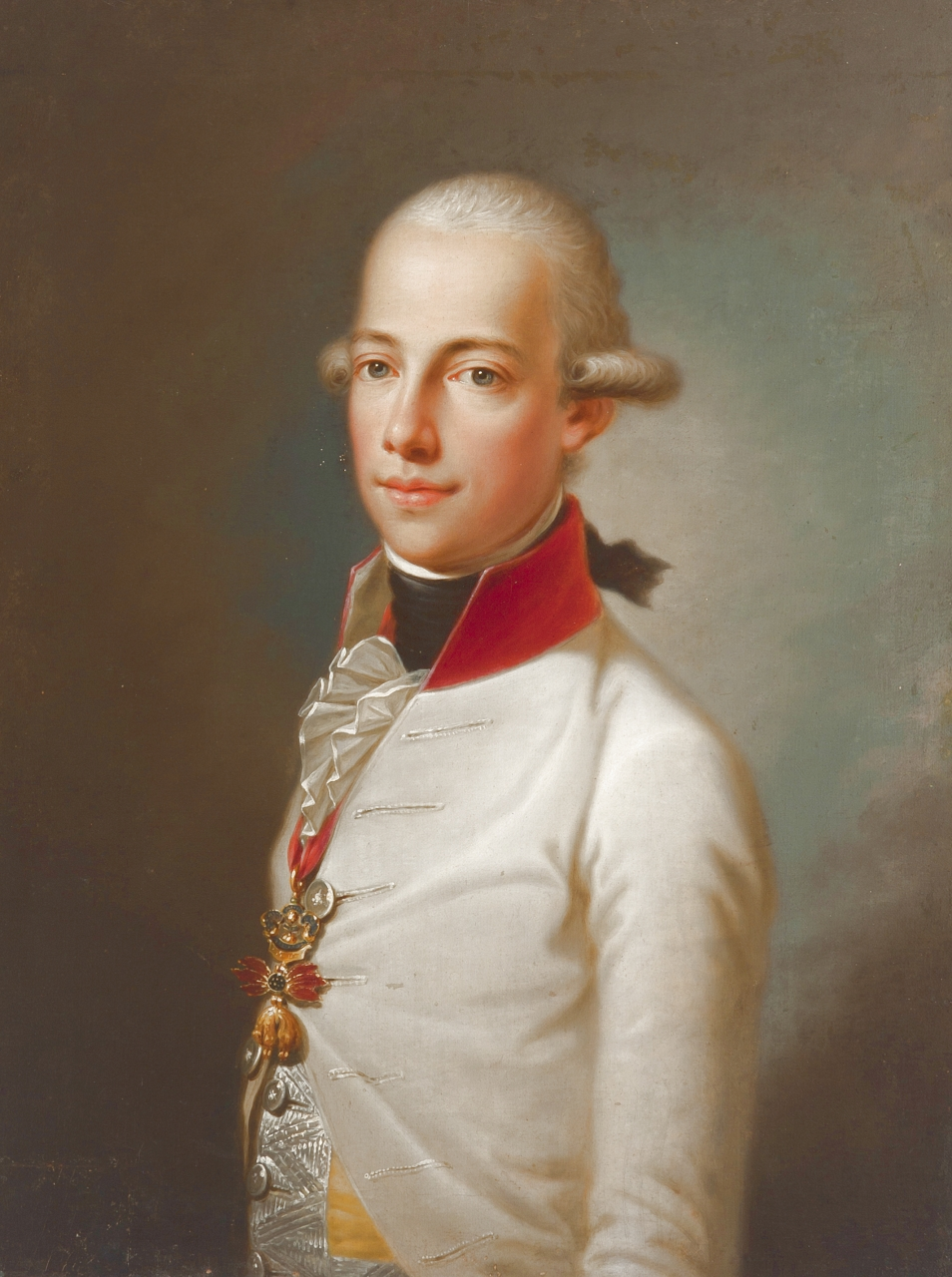
Archduke John of Austria, c. 1795

John's native language was Italian, though he learned to speak French and German fluently. Educated by the Swiss historian Johannes von Müller, he developed wide-ranging skills and interests, especially in the history and geography of the Alpine countries.

=== Military service ===
During the Napoleonic Wars, John was given command of the Austrian army in September 1800, despite his personal reluctance to assume the position. John was only 18 at the time. He showed personal bravery in the War of the Second Coalition, but his troops were crushed at the Battle of Hohenlinden on 3 December. Demoralized by defeat, the army nearly disintegrated in the subsequent retreat, which was only stopped by an armistice arranged on 22 December. After the Peace of Lunéville in 1801, Archduke John was made General Director of the Engineering and Fortification Service, and later commander of the Theresian Military Academy in Wiener Neustadt.

In the War of the Third Coalition, John again fought the French and Bavarian forces. From 1805 he directed an able defence of several Tyrolean passes against the French and was awarded the Commander Cross of the Military Order of Maria Theresa. However, according to the Peace of Pressburg, Austria had to cede Tyrol and Vorarlberg to Bavaria. John remained obliged to Tyrol and maintained friendly contact with Baron Joseph Hormayr who forged a resistance movement against the Bavarian occupation. In 1808, John pressed for the creation of Tyrolean Landwehr forces based on the success of the Prussian Landwehr, which played a vital role in the Tyrolean Rebellion led by Andreas Hofer.

At the commencement of the War of the Fifth Coalition in 1809 he became commander of the Army of Inner Austria, fighting against the French forces of Eugène de Beauharnais in Italy. Under his command were the VIII Armeekorps led by Albert Gyulai and the IX Armeekorps headed by Albert's brother Ignaz Gyulai. After winning a significant victory at the Battle of Sacile on 16 April 1809, his army advanced almost to Verona. Having detached forces to besiege Venice and other fortresses, John's army was soon outnumbered by Eugène's heavily reinforced host. Worse, news of the Austrian defeat at the Battle of Eckmühl reached him and compelled him to order a retreat. Before withdrawing, he fought off Franco-Italian attacks at the Battle of Caldiero between 27 and 30 April. Attempting to blunt the Franco-Italian pursuit, he stood to fight on 8 May and was beaten at the Battle of Piave River. Trying to defend the entire border, he sent Ignaz Gyulai to defend Laibach in Carniola, while holding Villach in Carinthia with his own forces. Eugène's pursuit overran the frontier defenses at the Battle of Tarvis and wrecked a column of hoped-for reinforcements at the Battle of Sankt Michael. Forced to flee northeast into Hungary, John offered battle again but, having mostly poorly trained and militia forces, was defeated at Raab on 14 June 1809. Ordered to join his brother Archduke Charles at the Battle of Wagram on 5 and 6 July, John's small army arrived too late to avert an Austrian defeat. His brother criticized him for tardiness.

After the conclusion of the campaign, John again evolved plans for a widespread rebellion. However, upon the Treaty of Schönbrunn Austrian policies under Minister Klemens von Metternich sought a rapprochement to France. John's friend Baron Joseph Hormayr and other conspirators were arrested, the Archduke himself effectively was sidelined and retired to his estates in Thernberg. For many years thereafter, rumors dogged him that he and Hormayr had evolved plans to create a Kingdom of Rhaetia from out of Austrian and Bavarian Alpine possessions. These rumors increased his isolation from the Court.

=== Post military ===
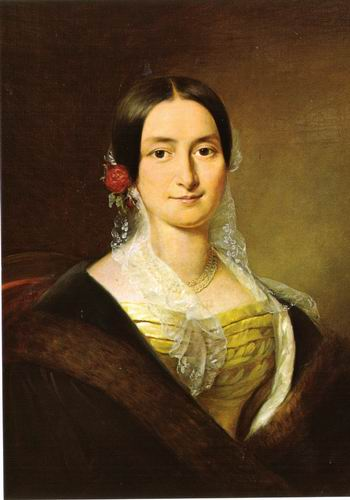
Anna Plochl

Tired of warfare, John turned away from the military and developed a great interest for nature, technology and agriculture. He collected minerals and was active as an alpinist and hunter in the Duchy of Styria. In his early days Archduke John and his brother Louis had the habit of travelling to France, where the latter married Madame de Gueroust. In 1815, on his visit to the Britain, John received a Doctor honoris causa degree from the University of Edinburgh.

In the history of Styria, he is remembered as a great modernizer and became an important figure of identification for Styrians. His proximity to the people is given evidence to by his many contacts with the common man, by wearing the local Tracht, the Steireranzug, and by collecting and promoting the material and spiritual culture of the country.

In 1811, he founded the Joanneum Museum in Graz and the predecessor of Graz University of Technology. Some other foundations were initiated by him, such as the Styrian State Archive 1817, the Steiermärkisch-Ständische Montanlehranstalt, which was founded in 1840 in Vordernberg and later became the University of Leoben, the Styrian Society for Agriculture 1819, the Mutual Fire Insurance, the Styrian Building Society, the Landesoberrealschule in 1845 and the Society for Styrian History in 1850. His routing of the Austrian Southern Railway from Vienna to Trieste over the Semmering Pass and through the Mura and Mürz valleys to Graz is particularly notable. The inheritance of his maternal uncle Albert Casimir, Duke of Teschen enabled him to acquire a tin factory in Krems near Voitsberg and coal mines near Köflach, thereby he also became an industrialist. In 1840, he bought the Stainz dominion. He was already the lord of the Brandhof manor in Mariazell.

In 1829, he married Anna Plochl (1804–1885), the daughter of Jakob Plochl, postmaster of Aussee, and his wife Maria Anna Pilz, during a nocturnal ceremony in Brandhof. By this morganatic marriage, John was excluded from succession to the throne. Emperor Francis elevated Anna to a "Baroness of Brandhofen" in 1834 and in 1839 she gave birth to a son, Franz, the only child from the marriage. His descendants were styled "Counts of Meran" and "Barons of Brandhofen", Proprietors of Stainz and Brandhofen.

John was also a passionate mountaineer in the Eastern Alps and attempted to be the first to climb the Großvenediger. For that reason, the Erzherzog-Johann-Hütte (Adlersruhe) at the Grossglockner, and the Archduke John's Vanilla Orchid (Nigritella rubra subsp. archiducis-joannis), an orchid growing on mountain meadows, are named after him.

=== The toast to 'German unity' at Brühl ===
On 4 September 1842, King Frederick William IV of Prussia inaugurated new construction to the as yet incomplete Cologne Cathedral. Dignitaries from all over Germany and Austria were invited, including Archduke John and Chancellor Klemens von Metternich. A farewell banquet was held in the Augustusburg Palace at Brühl. There, Frederick William toasted all of the guests who had fought in the Napoleonic War, including Archduke John, "whose name exhilarates us as a fresh breeze from the mountains." As thanks for the King's kind words, the Archduke remarked, "As long as Prussia and Austria, and as long as the rest of Germany wherever the German tongue is heard, are united, we shall be steadfast as the rocks of our mountains." However, the newspapers reported a different text of these remarks: "No longer shall be known Austria or Prussia, but a single Germany, lofty and sublime, Germany united and strong as her own mountains." This misquote was widely circulated among the reading public.

=== The Events of 1848 ===
Even though the Archduke John did not consider himself a liberal, he promoted some liberal ideas. He was often in conflict with the rigid Habsburg court, especially because of his morganatic marriage, though he would never espouse rebellion. He had earned great recognition in the Styrian lands and, moreover, he gained general acceptance by his jovial manners and his marriage with a middle-class woman. The remarks he had reputedly made in favor of German unification at the banquet in 1842, added to circulating rumors that the Archduke was a man of political liberalism, even though he was kept very far from politics by the Court.

==== Head of the Austrian Government ====
Rioting in the streets of Vienna caused the Imperial household to flee to Innsbruck on 17 May 1848. Based on his reputation among the masses as a liberal and his personal character as a loyal prince of the reigning House, Archduke John was appointed on 16 June to be an effective viceroy in the absence of the emperor. He was to both open the Constituent Diet and conduct the normal business of the government. By a proclamation dated 25 June and written entirely by himself, the Archduke assumed his responsibilities and set the date to open the Diet for 22 July 1848.

After he accepted the office of Regent of Germany on 5 July 1848 (see below), John maintained that he could not undertake his responsibilities in Frankfurt until he had fulfilled his responsibilities in Vienna. Therefore, he set out for Frankfurt on 8 July, the same day that the Austrian Ministry led by Baron Franz von Pillersdorf fell. After being appointed Regent in Frankfurt, he returned to Vienna on 17 July, and solemnly opened the Diet on 22 July as the emperor's representative. Shortly thereafter, the Archduke resigned his official duties and departed for Frankfurt. This caused the Diet to petition for the emperor's return to Vienna, and he did so on 12 August.

==== Regent of Germany ====
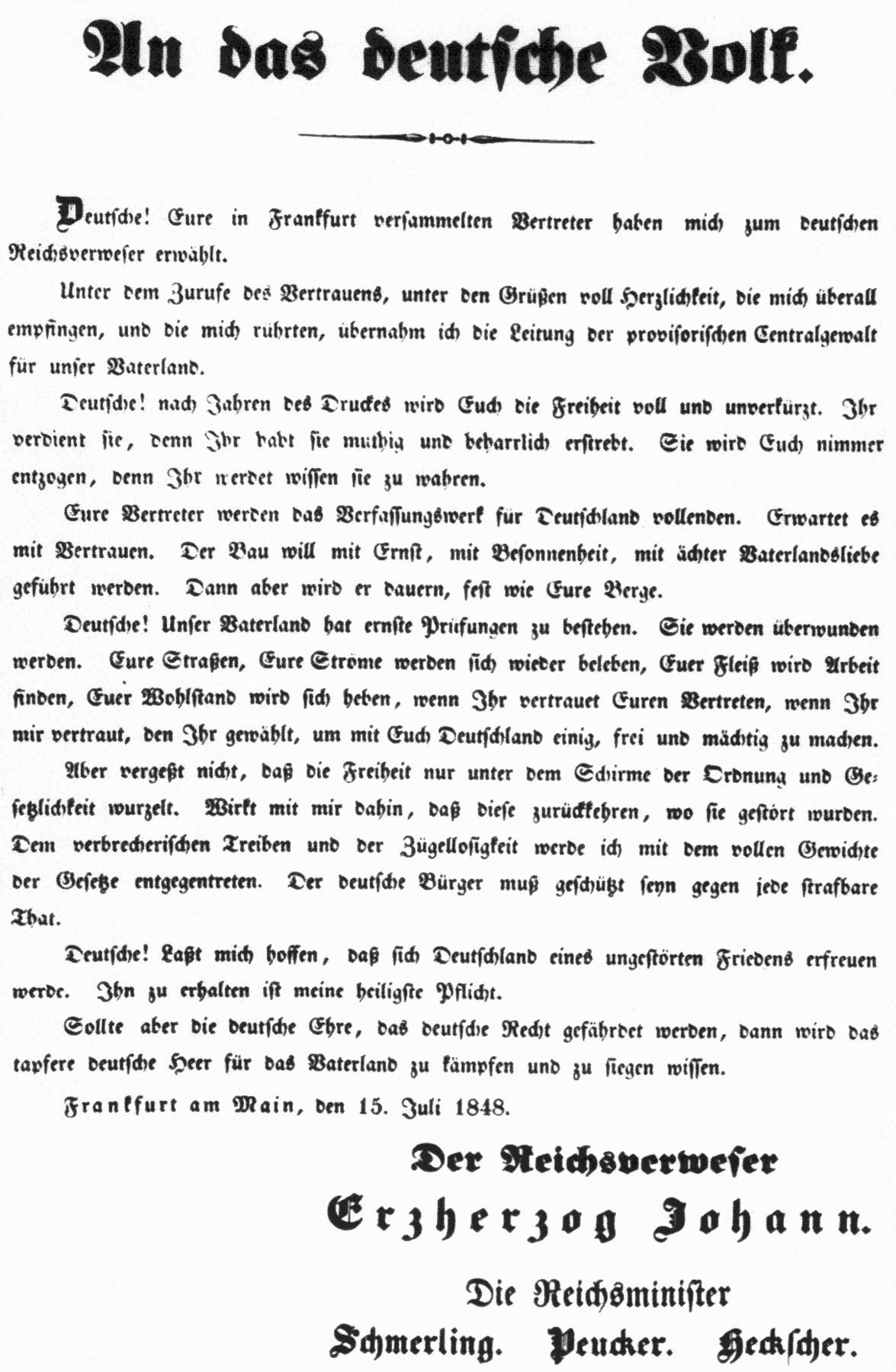
John's proclamation to the German people of 15 July 1848, after provisionally taking central control

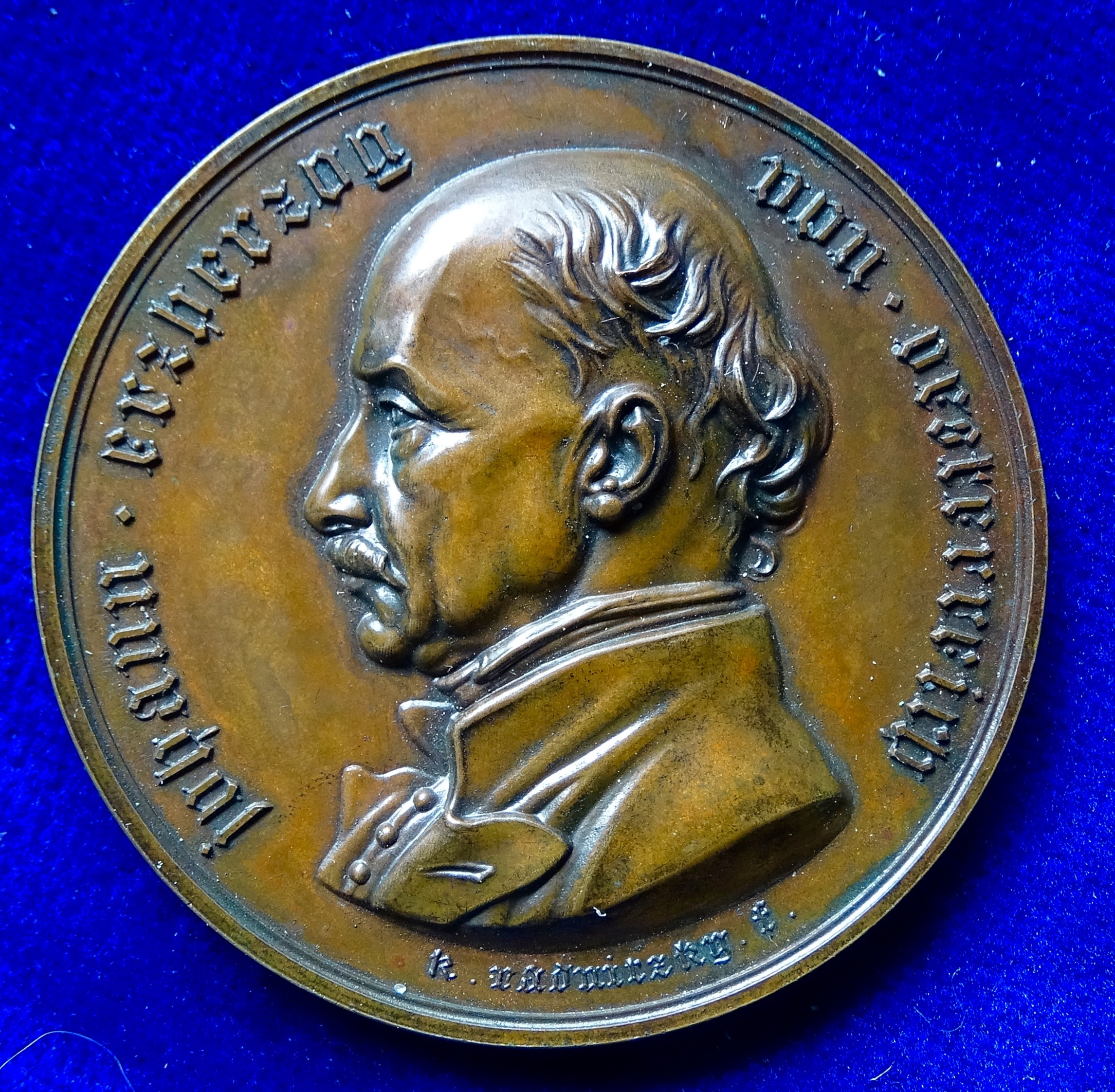
Election of Erzherzog Johann von Österreich 1848 as Imperial Regent (Reichsverweser) by the Frankfurt Parliament. Medal by Karl Radnitzky, obverse.

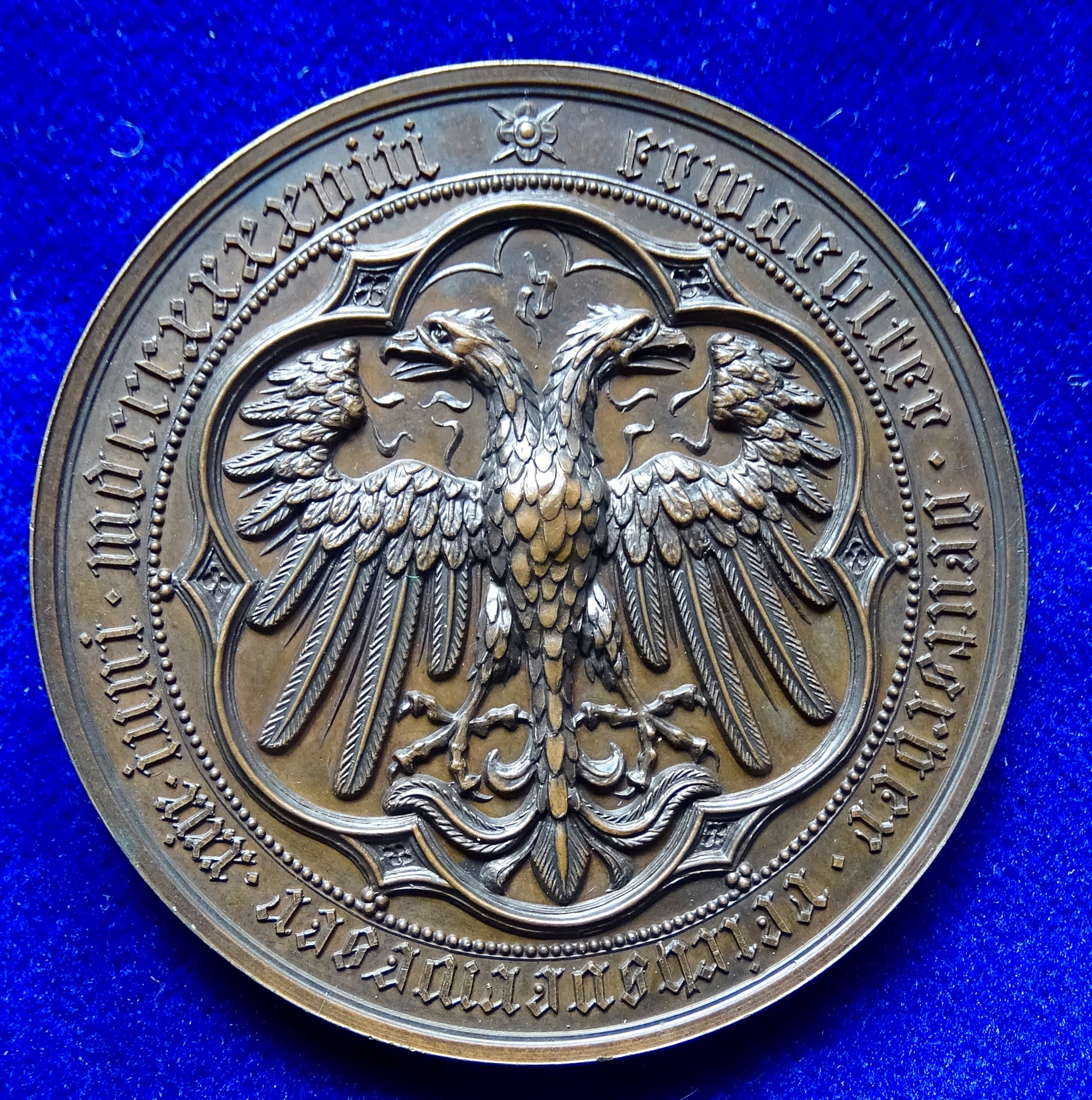
Election of Erzherzog Johann von Österreich 1848 as Imperial Regent (Reichsverweser) by the Frankfurt Parliament. Medal by Karl Radnitzky, reverse, showing the German double-headed Imperial Eagle.

Upon the March Revolution of 1848, the Frankfurt Parliament discussed the appointment of an all-German government replacing the Federal Convention. On a proposal by the liberal politician Heinrich von Gagern, the assembly on 28 June 1848 voted for the establishment of a central authority (Provisorische Zentralgewalt) and on the next day a broad majority elected Archduke John regent of the realm (Reichsverweser).

Archduke John accepted the nomination as head of the short-lived German Empire on 5 July 1848, and on 12 July the delegates of the Federal Convention, in response to public pressure, ceded their powers to him. On 15 July, the day he left for Vienna, the Regent appointed the ministers Anton von Schmerling, Johann Gustav Heckscher and Eduard von Peucker to office, completed by Prince Carl of Leiningen as minister president and head of government. Nevertheless, his political office did not offer many opportunities, though all laws had to be signed by him.

On 16 July 1848, War Minister von Peucker issued an order to all German Federal Army soldiers that, on 6 August 1848, they were to parade in honor of the Regent as the supreme commander of the Army in Germany. Upon his arrival in Vienna, the Archduke was greeted by Austrian War Minister Latour, who was quite upset with the interference of the provisional government in Austrian Army affairs. The whole Austrian Ministerial Council demanded action, and, as a result, the Archduke was forced to dispatch a formal complaint as Viceroy of Austria to himself as Regent of Germany.

First attempts by the government to obtain supreme command of the German Federal Army faced entrenched resistance from the member states. To strengthen support, the left-wing politician Robert von Mohl joined the Leiningen Cabinet on 9 August. Leiningen himself resigned on 6 September, after the Frankfurt assembly refused to ratify the Armistice of Malmö, signed by Prussia during the First Schleswig War. Minister Anton von Schmerling acted as head of government, until from November 1848 the cabinet gradually lost the support of the centrist Casino faction and finally its majority in parliament. Schmerling was forced to resign and on 17 December, Archduke John had to appoint Heinrich von Gagern new minister president, though he opposed his 'Lesser German' ideas.

By the terms of his Regency, Archduke John was forbidden to take part in the drafting of the Frankfurt Constitution, which was adopted on 28 March 1849 after lengthy negotiations led by Gagern. He inveighed against the strong position of Prussia and was determined to resign, but he was once again dissuaded by appeals from National Assembly President, Eduard von Simson. When in April 1849, King Frederick William IV of Prussia disappointed Gagern's hopes and openly rejected the Constitution, Archduke John remained passive and reminded his Prime Minister of the terms of his service as Regent, forbidding his interference in the process. Prime Minister Gagern handed in his resignation on 10 May.

Prussia exerted pressure on the Regent to vacate the office that he had resigned, but the Archduke insisted that he would remain out of a sense of obligation, and had powerful backing from Austria's Prime Minister, Prince Schwarzenberg, who was eager to stifle Prussian ambitions in Germany. Nevertheless, he departed for a prolonged stay at the health resort of Bad Gastein. At this point, the National Assembly was reduced to a rump parliament led by radicals and in opposition to the Regent. The Regency existed in name only, though the Archduke continued formal correspondence with Vienna and Berlin as such. He finally was allowed to resign from his office on 20 December 1849. When Archduke John came back to Frankfurt on a visit in 1858, he openly regretted the failure of German unification.

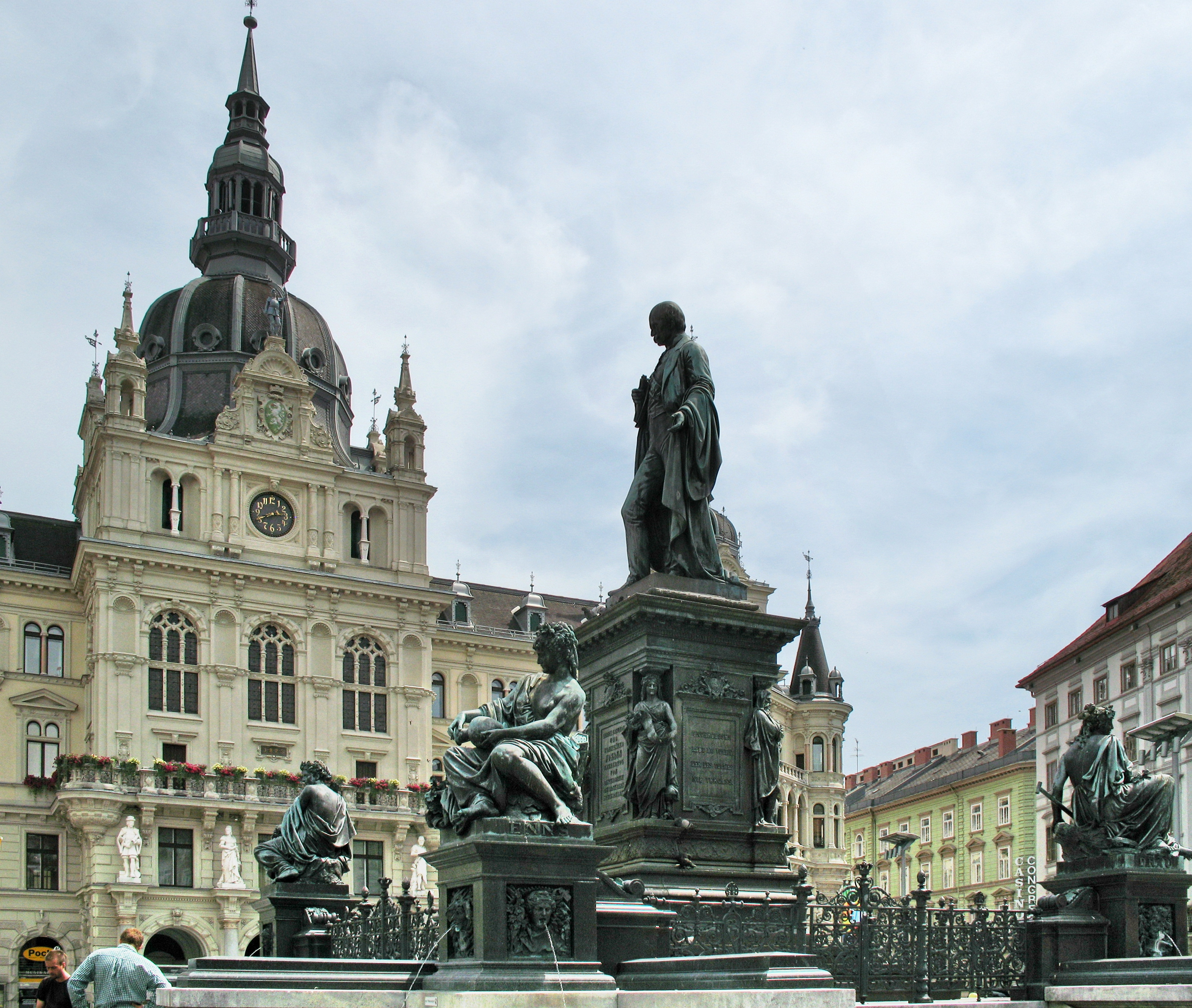
Archduke John memorial in Graz

=== Mayor of Stainz ===
After nearly two years absence, the Archduke returned to Stainz, where he was elected the town's first mayor on 23 July 1850. Except for Leopold II of Tuscany, who after his abdication was elected mayor of Schlackenwerth (Ostrov), this was the first and only case in Austria when a member of the Imperial family was elected mayor of a small market town. He exercised this office until 1858, represented in his occasional absence by market judge Georg Ensbrunner.

=== Death ===
Archduke John died in 1859 in Graz, where a fountain erected in his honor dominates the central square. He is buried in Schenna near Meran.

== Honours ==
He received the following orders and decorations:

- Austrian Empire:
  - Knight of the Golden Fleece, 1792
  - Grand Cross of the Military Order of Maria Theresa, 1809
  - Grand Cross of the Imperial Order of Leopold
- Württemberg: Grand Cross of the Military Merit Order, 10 September 1815
- Kingdom of Saxony: Knight of the Rue Crown, 1819
- (Saxe-Coburg and Gotha) (Duchy of Saxe-Altenburg) (Saxe-Meiningen) Ernestine duchies: Grand Cross of the Saxe-Ernestine House Order, May 1835
- Russian Empire:
  - Knight of St. Andrew, 1835
  - Knight of St. Alexander Nevsky, 1835
  - Knight of the White Eagle, 1835
  - Knight of St. Anna, 1st Class, 1835
- Kingdom of Prussia:
  - Knight of the Black Eagle, 9 September 1835
  - Knight of the Red Eagle, 1st Class
- Baden:
  - Knight of the House Order of Fidelity, 1842
  - Grand Cross of the Zähringer Lion, 1842
- Grand Duchy of Hesse: Grand Cross of the Ludwig Order, 23 September 1842
- Belgium: Grand Cordon of the Order of Leopold, 17 May 1845
- Kingdom of Bavaria: Knight of St. Hubert, 1850
- Oldenburg: Grand Cross of the Order of Duke Peter Friedrich Ludwig, with Golden Crown, 25 October 1857
- Kingdom of Greece: Grand Cross of the Redeemer
- Netherlands: Grand Cross of the Netherlands Lion

== Ancestry ==
Ancestors of Archduke John of Austria

8. Leopold, Duke of Lorraine
4. Francis I, Holy Roman Emperor
9. Élisabeth Charlotte of Orléans
2. Leopold II, Holy Roman Emperor
10. Charles VI, Holy Roman Emperor
5. Maria Theresa of Austria
11. Elisabeth Christine of Brunswick
1. Archduke Johann of Austria
12. Philip V of Spain
6. Charles III of Spain
13. Elisabeth Farnese
3. Maria Luisa of Spain
14. Augustus III of Poland
7. Maria Amalia of Saxony
15. Maria Josepha of Austria

== In popular culture ==
Archduke John is a playable character in some versions of Risk.

"Erzherzog Johann Jodler" is a popular folk song about Archduke John which is often performed by yodeling groups today.
