= Stainz =

- Municipality
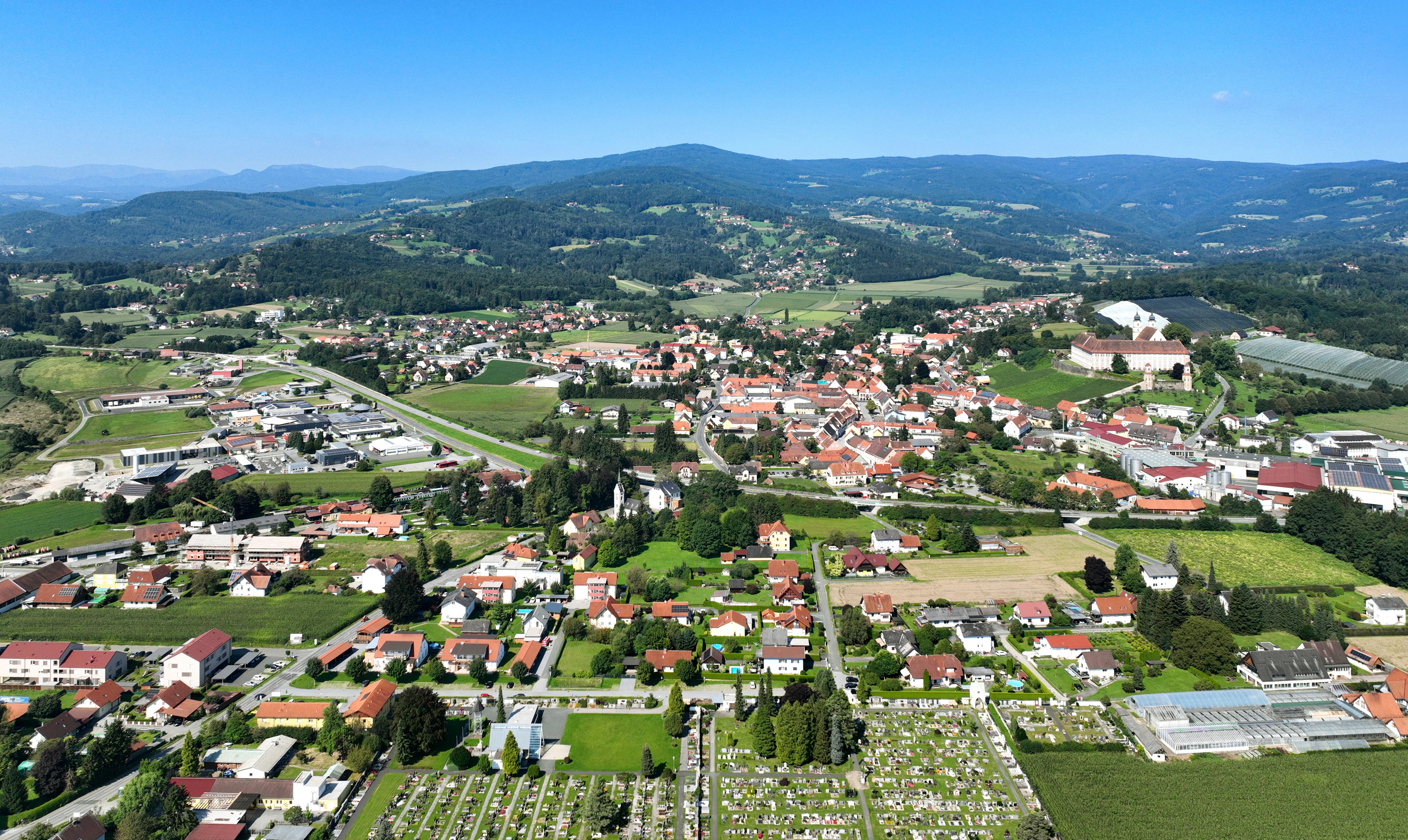
- East view of Stainz

- Coat of arms

- Location within Austria
- Coordinates: 46°53′00″N 15°16′00″E
- Country: Austria
- State: Styria
- District: Deutschlandsberg

Government
  - Mayor: Walter Eichmann (ÖVP)

Area
  - Total: 92.46 km^{2} (35.70 sq mi)
- Elevation: 349 m (1,145 ft)
- Time zone: UTC+1 (CET)
  - Summer (DST): UTC+2 (CEST)
- Postal code: 8510, 8524, 8503, 8504, 8522
- Area code: +43 3463, 3185, 3464, 3136
- Vehicle registration: DL
- Website: www.stainz.at

Stainz (German: [ʃtaɪnts]) is a municipality in the district of Deutschlandsberg in the Austrian state of Styria. A notable building there is Schloss Stainz, a former monastery complex that belongs to the Counts of Meran and hosts collections from the Universalmuseum Joanneum. The town is known for its cultural and historical attractions, including Schloss Stainz, a former monastery complex now owned by the Counts of Meran, and its association with Schilcher wine.

== Population ==
Historical population
Year	Pop.	±%
1869	6,335	—
1880	6,526	+3.0%
1890	7,369	+12.9%
1900	7,324	−0.6%
1910	7,367	+0.6%
1923	7,155	−2.9%
1834	7,133	−0.3%
1939	6,790	−4.8%
1951	7,436	+9.5%
1961	7,158	−3.7%
1971	7,438	+3.9%
1981	7,522	+1.1%
1991	7,676	+2.0%
2001	8,159	+6.3%
2011	8,456	+3.6%
2016	8,590	+1.6%
