= Grundlsee =

- Municipality
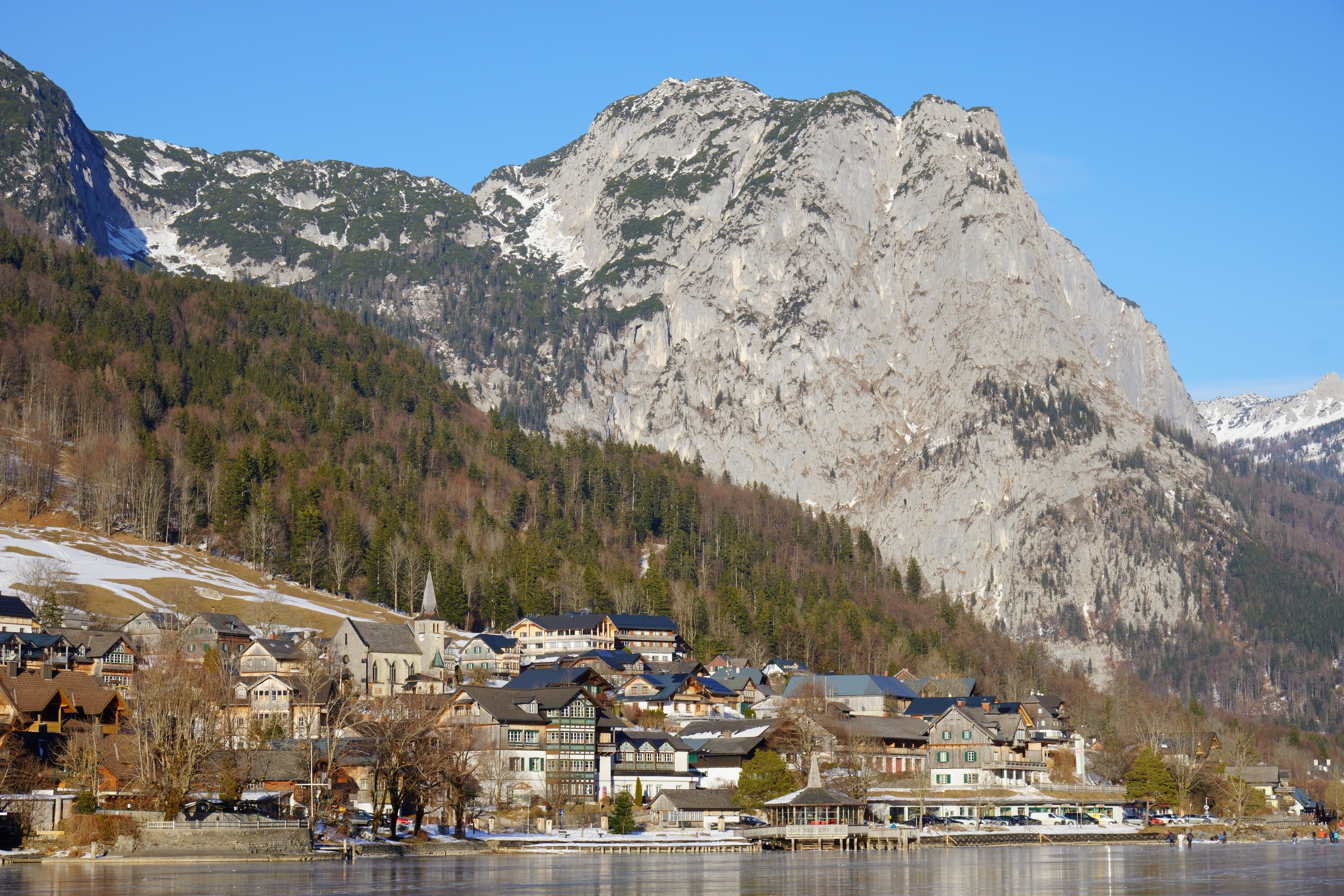
- Centre of Grundlsee with Backenstein

- Coat of arms

- Location within Austria
- Coordinates: 47°37′36″N 13°50′15″E
- Country: Austria
- State: Styria
- District: Liezen

Government
  - Mayor: Franz Steinegger (ÖVP)

Area
  - Total: 152.23 km^{2} (58.78 sq mi)
- Elevation: 732 m (2,402 ft)

Population (2018-01-01)
  - Total: 1,199
  - Density: 7.876/km^{2} (20.40/sq mi)
- Time zone: UTC+1 (CET)
  - Summer (DST): UTC+2 (CEST)
- Postal code: 8993
- Area code: +43 3622
- Vehicle registration: LI
- Website: www.grundlsee.at

Grundlsee (Austrian German: [ˈɡrʊndl̩seː]) is a municipality in the Liezen District of Styria, Austria. The municipality includes 151.54 km ² large parts of the Ausseerland and the Dead Mountains. The village is located directly on Grundlsee lake.

== Geography ==
=== Location ===
The community Grundlsee is located in Ausseerland in the Styrian Salzkammergut in the district of Liezen, Styria. Grundlsee is located at 732 m above sea level directly on the Grundlsee on the southwestern edge of the Totes Gebirge.

The five villages of the municipality are located in an elongated valley on the shores of the Grundlsee, which is framed on three sides by the approximately 1000 meters towering foothills of the Dead Mountains. The valley has an east-west length of about ten kilometers (to the Kammersee) and a width of about one kilometer in a north-south direction with the only opening to the west to the Bad Ausseer basin.

The most striking mountains that frame this valley are the Hundskogel (1748 m), the Backenstein (1772 m) and the Reichenstein (1913 m) in the north, the Elm (2128 m), the Große Hochkasten (2389 m) and the Weiße Wall (2198 m) in the east, the Turkenkogel (1756 m) and the Röthelstein (1614 m) in the south. The highest mountain of Grundlsee is the Große Hochkasten with 2389 m at the border to Upper Austria.

The inhabited area has an average height of 750 m. Due to the alpine position and the strong proportion of the Dead Mountains, about 75% of the municipality consist of alpine wastelands, the rest are forests, grassland and other forms of land.

=== Waters ===
The Grundlsee is 4.22 km², the largest lake in Styria and is drained by the Grundlseer Traun, one of the three source rivers of the Traun. It is fed by the Stimitz, the Zimitzbach and the Toplitz, the Entwässerungsbach of lying in the community Toplitzsees. In addition, there are the Dreibrüdersee, the Elmsee, the Henarsee, the Kammersee and the Lahngangseen in the municipality, as well as the source waters of the Traun, the so-called Traun origin.

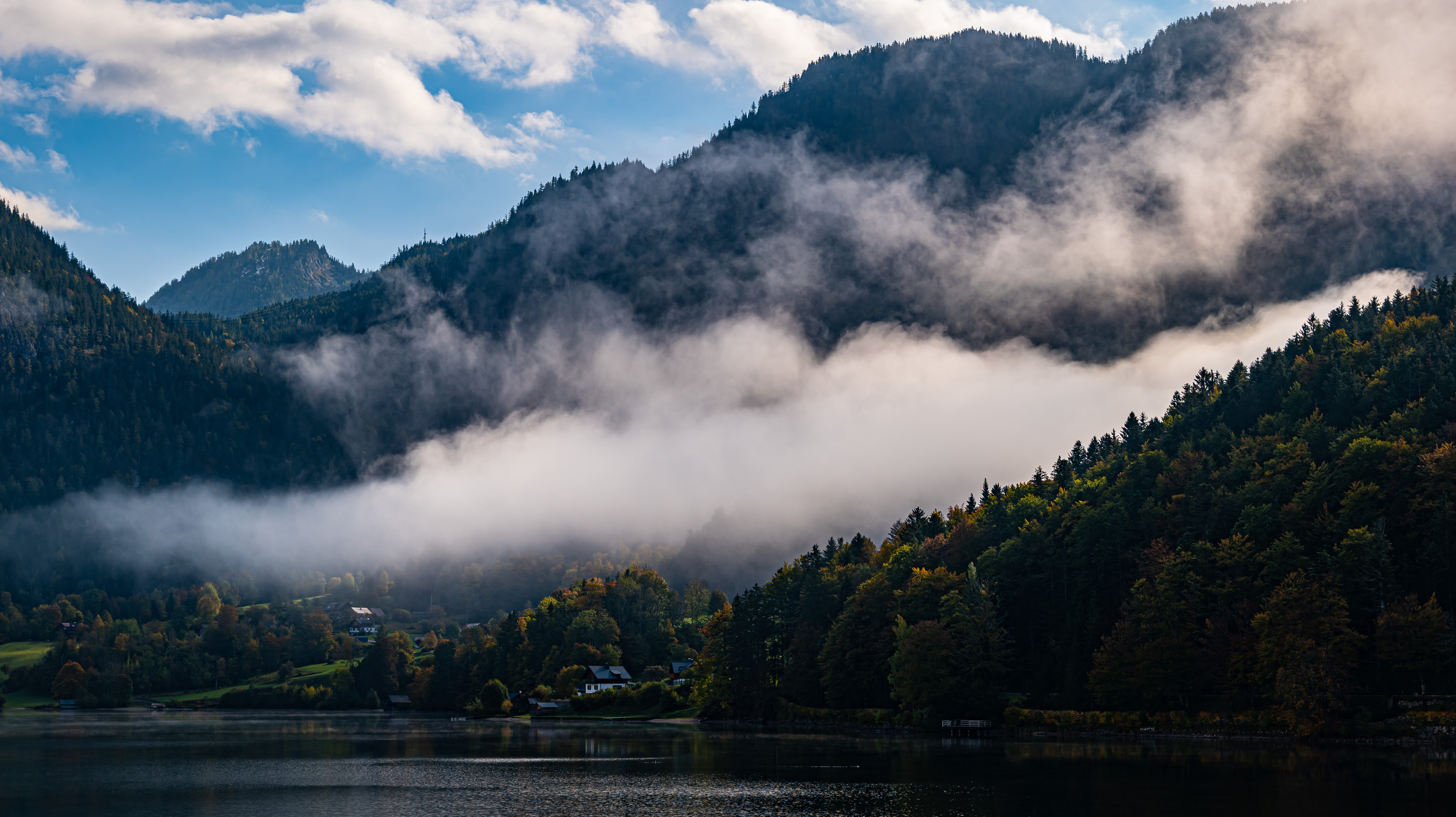
View on Grundlsee 2023

=== Geology ===
The Dead Mountains, whose foothills surround Grundlsee on three sides, consist mainly of limestone and dolomite, which originated in the Mesozoic seas, especially the Triassic and Jurassic, about 210 to 135 million years ago. In the north of the municipal area occurs mainly the Plass limestone of the Jura, in the east mainly the Dachstein limestone of the Triassic and in the south the Triassic with Zlambachmergel, Pedatakalk, Hallstätter layers, Gutensteiner lime and dolomite in appearance. The west Grundlsee towards Bad Aussee features a high glacial ground moraine from the Würm-glacial period. The gypsum and anhydrite deposit at the settlement of Wienern ( Gößl ) was built from the Upper Permian to the Scythian and consists of alpine Haselgebirge. The lake basin of the Grundlsee was formed during the Würm icing as the tongue basin of a glacier.

The settlement nuclei of the villages Bräuhof, Archkogel, Mosern and Untertressen in the west of the municipality are completely on alluvial plains, slope debris areas and ground moraines which are mostly in the Würm-glacial, sometimes postglacial originated. The settlement center of the village Gößl lies entirely on a low terrace from the Pleistocene.

The Verkarstung formed many sinkholes and caves, such as the approximately 17 km long Almberg cave system at the foot of the baking stone.

=== Climate ===
The climate in Grundlsee is determined by its geographical location in the Aussee Basin. It is characterized mainly by the high altitude and the location in the northern congestion area. The result is, in the case of flow conditions from the west to the north, often days of precipitation, which in winter are accompanied by a lot of snow. With 100 to 120 days of snow cover per year, the Ausseer Becken is one of the snowiest areas in Austria. From October to May, snowfall is expected, with December to March, on average, every third day has fresh snow. Fall has a relative sunshine duration over 50%, the sunniest time in the region. The climate in the Ausseer basin is often described as a stimulating climate, especially in winter.

Conservation

A large part of the Grundlsee municipal area is under strict environmental protection. The following nature protection levels exist:

- Natura 2000 European Conservation Areas ( Dead Mountains with Lake Altaussee - AT2243000),
- Nature Reserves ( Totes Gebirge West - NSG a 16),
- Protected caves (including Salzofenhöhle ),
- Protected landscape parts (GLT-8),
- Protected Landscape Areas (LSG-14a - Salzkammergut Ost) and
- Natural monuments (339, 341, 343, 352).

The entire municipality is also within the scope of the Alpine Convention.

=== Municipal organization and neighboring communities ===
The municipality consists of the only cadastral Grundlsee and includes five localities (population as of 1 January 2018). Starting clockwise and north of the lake, these are:

- Archkogl (227)
- Bräuhof (370)
- Gößl (335)
- Mosern (196)
- Underrides (71)

There is no village called "Grundlsee", because the community owes its name to the lake of the same name. The main town of the municipality is the village Bräuhof.

Grundlsee has five neighboring communities, the communities Grünau im Almtal and Hinterstoder are located in the Upper Austrian district of Gmunden, all others in the Styrian Salzkammergut.

== History ==
=== Name History ===
The name Grundlsee comes from standard German [ grundlseː ]. The name was first mentioned in 1188 as Chrungilse. The spelling of the name varied over time, until finally enforced the current spelling: Chrungilse (1188)> Chrungelse (1300)> Chrungelsee (1386)> Krungelsee(1450)> Crungelsee (1479)> Grunglsee (1493) > Lake Chrundel & Grundelsee (1494)> Krunglsee (1496)> Lake Crungl (1566)> Grundelsee(1665)> Grundlsee (today). The name of Grundlsee is derived from the name of the lake. This probably originated in the Old Slavic krągl jezero ( round lake ). However, instead of the Krungelsee this original form changed to today's Grundlsee. This was probably done by a folk etymological effect of the Middle High German grundel, grundelinc ( the gudgeon ).

=== Prehistoric times, Celts and Roman times ===
The earliest evidence of human settlement activity in Grundlseer community area form Paleolithic finds in the Salzofen cave in the Dead Mountains. Charcoal remains of a Paleolithic hearth found there were dated to around 34,000 years ago. Numerous relics from the Bronze Age and the Iron Age, as well as a Bronze Age settlement were found along the natural transport line of Koppentales in the neighboring community Bad Aussee. These findings can be explained in the context of Hallstatt only 20 km away, which was due to its archaeological significance eponymous for the early Iron Age (800-450 BC). The younger Iron Age / La Tène period (500-100 BC), which was carried by the Celts, left no archaeological traces. Only the river name Traun (from Celtic druna, the running one) indicates Celtic settlement. As witnesses of the Roman rule in Noricum late Roman traces of settlement were discovered during excavations in Bad Aussee and the Altausseer Michlhallberg ( Sandling -Massiv). According to the previously retrieved finds, the settlement in Altaussee may have existed from the end of the 2nd century AD until the late 4th century. It is believed there a Roman salt mining.

=== Slavs and Bavarians ===
The epoch of migration did not leave any traces in Ausseerland. The next population group that can be proved with certainty were the Slavs. Name-related traces of the Slavic settlement can be found in the entire Ausseerland (place names and field names ending in -itz, -itsch, -isch, in Grundlsee eg, Stimitz, Toplitz, Zimitz ). Around 800, a strong influx of baju goods began. Important traces of the first contact of the Slavs with the Bavarians are again the place names. The earliest datable Eindeutschungen of place names in the Ausseerland come from the Old High German time before 1100.

=== Middle Ages ===
The name Grundlsee ( apud chrungilse ) was first mentioned on 2 August 1188 in a document. Duke Ottokar IV was on this day at the Grundlsee and sealed there three documents.

After the death of the last Babenberg Duke Frederick II in 1246, the chosen archbishop of Salzburg, Philipp von Spanheim, occupied large parts of the Enns Valley and thus also the Ausseerland. In order to fortify the new claim to power and to protect the nearby salt mines on the Sandling massif and the mule tracks, he built the small fortress Pflindsberg in neighboring Altaussee. Philipp von Spanheim had to retire after the peace of furnace from 1254 and the castle and the Ausseerland were incorporated into 1260 in Styria. The previous history of Ausseerland is controversial. Most likely it was part of a county in the Ennstal under the Margraves of the Carinthian Mark in the 12th to 13th centuries. The theory that the Ausseer area previously belonged to County Traunau, can not be proven. The plant developed into an administrative center with lower jurisdiction of the independent rule Pflindsberg, which was separated from the sovereign rule Grauscharn-Pürgg. It comprised about 90% of the goods of the Ausseerland and was as a part of the Salzkammergut princely.

=== Protestantism, re-catholization (from 1599), dominance of salt mining ===
With the Reformation in the 16th century, the population of Ausseerland had become largely Protestant. From 1599, a recatholization commission violently enforced the Counter-Reformation. From the larger military conflicts and social upheavals of the 16th and 17th centuries ( peasant wars, Thirty Years War ) the entire Ausseerland was spared. Reasons for the lack of social tensions were a relatively secure livelihood of the population and far-reaching social concessions on the part of the authorities. The entire Salzkammergut was a closed territory, which had dedicated itself to a mono-economy. The sole source of income was salt production, to which all economic activity was coordinated. In Altaussee the salt was mined. Grundlsees role in this mono-economy was mainly the supply of brewing pans with the necessary firewood, which required salt extraction forestry. In addition, the workers employed in this branch were mostly small part-time farmers who, together with their family members, produced a part of the essential products themselves. Due to the austerity and the severe climatic conditions, there were only relatively few full-time farmers in the entire region.

During the Napoleonic wars, French troops marched through the Ausseerland several times between 1800 and 1809. In 1809, therefore, the Koppen Pass and the Pötschen Pass were entrenched and fortified. But fighting did not happen. In 1813 fortified the Pötschenpass again, this time with several gun positions, a powder magazine and two barracks. The expected battles for the pass failed, as Napoleon's troops were decisively defeated in October 1813 in the Battle of Nations near Leipzig.

=== Beginnings of tourism ===
At the beginning of the 19th century, the Salzkammergut was discovered as a summer resort. Archduke Johann of Austria met his future wife Anna Plochl at the Toplitzsee in August 1819. The nearby Bad Ischl developed into a prominent health resort and was from 1849 the imperial summer residence. Due to the presence of the nobility in the region, the Ausseerland became more and more a center of attraction for the noble society. Soon it attracted many artists and representatives of Viennese society to Grundlsee, which had become since 1850 by the abolition of the manorial system (1848) a political community. The Ausseer landscape attracted many painters. Between 1801 and 1848, Archduke Johann had his chamber painters work in the Ausseerland, among others Jakob Gauermann, Matthäus Loder, Thomas Ender and Jakob and Rudolf Alt, where a variety of landscape paintings with Grundlseer motifs was created. Another painter working in Grundlsee is Johann Matthias Ranftl, after whom the Ranftlmühle, built in 1850, is named on the Stimitzbach. The Kronprinz-Rudolf-Bahn was opened in 1877 and the Ausseerland was finally infrastructurally well-developed for tourism. In 1879 tourist steamboat traffic was started in Grundlsee with the wooden steamboat Erzherzog Johann. Among the artists and intellectuals who spent their summer vacation in Grundlsee, or settled there permanently, the industrialist and folklorist Konrad Mautner, the neurologist and founder of psychoanalysis Sigmund Freud and the conductor Herbert von Karajan are particularly noteworthy.

=== National Socialism, Alpine Fortress, Nazi Treasure in Toplitzsee ===
After the annexation of Austria to the German Reich in 1938, the entire Ausseerland was incorporated into the administrative unit Oberdonau (Upper Austria). The autonomy of the communities Bad Aussee, Grundlsee and Altaussee was dissolved and a mayor was established in Bad Aussee. The municipal offices Grundlsee and Altaussees were henceforth field offices of Bad Aussee.

The Ausseerland subsequently attracted numerous Nazi personalities. For example, three National Socialist Gauleiters regularly spent their holidays in the neighboring town of Altaussee: August Eigruber, Konrad Henlein and Hugo Jury. The Nazi Propaganda Minister Joseph Goebbels and his family resided in the castle Grundlsee.

In 1943, they had begun to set up a depot for art goods in the nearby salt mine Altaussee. In August of the same year began the storage of art treasures from Austrian churches, monasteries and museums to protect them from bombing. As of February 1944, the stock of about 4700 works of art was stored. It was this stolen art goods throughout Europe, which was accumulated under the code name Special Order Linz by Adolf Hitler and was intended for the planned Führer Museum in Linz. At the end of the war, the entire depot contained about 6,500 paintings as well as numerous statues, furniture, weapons, coins and libraries in eleven decommissioned factories. Including a part of the planned so-called guide library. The largest collection of this library was deposited at Villa Castiglioni in Grundlsee. (Salvage Salzbergwerk Altaussee )

Between 1943 and 1945 numerous weapons-technical experiments of the German Navy were carried out on Toplitzsee. At the end of the war, boxes of fake British banknotes from Operation Bernhard were sunk in the lake, which should have weakened the British economy. There are rumors that gold reserves of the Third Reich, notes for numbered accounts and works of art were sunk in the lake. These rumors of the "gold treasure in Toplitzsee" have not been confirmed to date.

The Ausseerland was part of the so-called Alpine fortress and 1944/45 a last retreat for National Socialist party and government agencies and Wehrmacht staffs. However, entire governments, which had been used by the National Socialists in the Balkan states, also sought refuge. In the neighboring Altaussee, for example, there were nine secessionist exile governments from Eastern Europe.

The Americans reached the Ausseerland on May 8, 1945. The next day, the main force of the US Army followed. Previously, a self-employed civil government under Albrecht Gaiswinkler had formed in Bad Aussee, which kept order.

=== Second Republic ===
On July 1, 1948 Grundlsee was again back to Styria. From 1945 to 1955, it was part of the US occupation zone in Austria. Until 2011 Grundlsee was part of the political jurisdiction, Bad Aussee, which was converted from January 1, 2012 in a field office of the Lieutenant District Liezen. Within the framework of the Styrian municipal structural reform, a merger with the municipalities of Bad Aussee and Altaussee was under discussion for a few years. Since February 2013, however, it has been decided that the three communities will remain independent.

== Population ==
=== Population Development and Structure ===
The municipality is populated with a population density of 7.9 inhabitants per km ² comparatively sparsely (for comparison: Styria has 75.4 and Austria 104.6 inhabitants per km ²).

The rough age of the Grundlsee population as of October 13, 2011 shows that 63.6% of Grundlsee residents are over 15 and under 65 years old. 11.6% of the population are younger, 24.8% older. The proportion of women in the population is 52.6%.

According to the 2011 register, 7.9% of over-15s graduated from universities, colleges or academies (62.5% women), 11.6% had graduates(51.6% women) and 54.9% have completed an apprenticeship or vocational middle school (female share 47.8%). 25.4% of over-fifteen-year-olds have only a compulsory education, including 63.6% women.

=== Origin, language and religion ===
According to the 2011 registry, 95.9% of Grundlsee residents were Austrian citizens, 93.4% were born in Austria. 3.3% of the Grundlseer came from other EU states, 0.8% from non-EU states. In Grundlsee, as in the rest of the Salzkammergut, a variety of the Central or Donaubair dialect is spoken. In the 2001 census, 98.3% of the population reported German as the vernacular, 0.1 Burgenland-Croatian, 0.1% Croatian, 0.6% Serbian, 0.1% Hungarian, and 0.9% another language.

According to the same census, 87.0% of Grundlsee Roman Catholics declared their religion as belonging to the religion, 4.4% Protestant, 0.4% Orthodox, 0.2% Israelite, 0.1% Islamic and 0.4% Other faiths. 6.5% of the population said they were not a confessor. With the Catholic parish church Grundlsee in the village Bräuhof and Messkapelle Gößl there are two official religious meeting rooms in the municipality. The area of the community Grundlsee is today part of the Catholic parish association of the "Ausseerland parishes" and is cared for by the parish Bad Aussee. The members of the Protestant church belong to the Protestant parish Bad Aussee.

== Politics ==
The official blazon of the municipal coat of arms awarded in 1982 reads:

"In red, a silver Aquarius, half human, half fish, with the right angles pointing upwards, holding the left silver gypsum crystals."

- Styrian Provincial Government

The Aquarius in the coat of arms is an allusion to the legend of Aquarius in the Grundlsee : An Aquarius caught in the Grundlsee is said to have released the salt deposit in Sandling in the neighboring town of Altaussee in order to obtain his release. The gypsum crystals in his hand are a reference to the gypsum deposit at Grundlsee. The color red should point to the vital importance of salt, the silver color to the salt itself.

== Culture ==
=== Architecture ===
- Kreuzkapelle
- Imperial stable

The Imperial stable is a former stable building in the district of Mosern. As early as 1568 a Fischmeisterhaus on Grundlsee was mentioned, which included a barn and a stable. One of the two buildings is today's imperial stable. Its name is reminiscent of the time, when the Fischmeistergut was still "imperial-high Forst ärar ". In 1928, the entire estate was incorporated into the Federal Treasury and in 1941 became the property of the Reichsforst Administration of the German Reich . In 1947 it returned to the possession of the Republic of Austria, which passed it in 1952 by name to the Austrian Federal Forestry. The former stable no longer served as a stable, but was used as a storage room and payout room for the lumberjacks. Today, the imperial stable serves as a space for exhibitions. The building is on the ground floor, the two upper floors are made of wood.

- Fischkalter
- Ranftlmühle

The wooden Ranftlmühle, built in 1850 on the River Stimitz, was named after the Viennese painter Johann Matthias Ranftl (1804-1854), who liked to spend time at the Grundlsee. In recent years, the mill has been extensively renovated.

- Schachner mill
- Toplitzklause

=== Museums ===
In the municipality is the Imperial stable, which is used during the summer months for exhibitions.

Other museums in Ausseerland are the Kammerhof Museum in Bad Aussee, the central museum of the region with an extensive collection on the history and folk culture of Ausseerland, the Altaussee Literature Museum, and the Altaussee salt mines, the mine of the Altausseer salt mine. The exhibition series Kunst am Steinberg takes place in the summer months in the premises of the Altaussee mine.

=== Regular events ===
Three regular events in Grundlsee should be highlighted here. Every year at the end of May, the Daffodil Festival takes place in Ausseerland. The associated boat parade takes place annually alternately once in Altaussee and once in Grundlsee.

The other two worth mentioning events Grundlsee are concert series. Since 2005 (however pausing in 2016 and 2017), in and around the village of Gößl, on a half summer sunday, there will be a party on the theme of art, culture, nature and people.

Every year the band Die Seer, based in Grundlsee, plays an open air in the nature arena "Zloam" in Grundlsee.

== Economy and Infrastructure ==
=== Education, Safety, Health and Associations ===
- In the community there is an independent elementary school .
- Secondary schools up to the Matura are located in the neighboring municipality of Bad Aussee.
- The nearest full university is located in Salzburg, 85 km away.
- There is no longer a police station today. The area of responsibility of the former gendarmerie post was attached to the police inspection Bad Aussee.
- The community has with the volunteer fire department Grundlsee founded in 1890 and founded in 1906 volunteer fire department Gößltwo independent fire departments. The main building of the former is located in the village of Bräuhof, the second in the village of Gößl,which is 8 km to the east.
- In Gößl also stands the boathouse of the Wasserwehr Grundlsee / Gößl .
- Health care by a general practitioner or a specialist must generally be done in the neighboring Bad Aussee. There is also the LKH Bad Aussee, which is operated together with the LKH Rottenmann as "Hospital Association Rottenmann-Bad Aussee".

Grundlsee has more than 23 clubs (2014) registered.

=== Traffic ===
Due to its relatively secluded location in a basin, Grundlsee is only connected to the trans-regional road network in the west. Here it is the Grundlseerstraße L 703, which connects the municipality in the west with Bad Aussee, which is about five kilometers away. From there, the Salzkammergutstraße B 145 is the connection to the west via the Pötschenpass to Bad Goisern and Bad Ischl and east to the Hinterbergtaland on via the Klachauer Höhe to Trautenfels in the Enns Valley.

By public transport Grundlsee can be reached by bus from ÖBB-Postbus GmbH. The bus line 956 connects the community daily up to twelve times to the neighboring community Bad Aussee (journey time: 15 minutes to Bräuhof, 20 minutes to Gößl ). The closest connection to the railway network is also located 5 km westerly Bad Aussee.

On the Grundlsee run from the beginning of May to the end of October, the ships of the shipping Grundlsee. From the landing stage Grundlsee Seeklause on the western shore of the lake, a motorboat travels five times a day to Gößl on the eastern shore of the lake and back (with a stopover at the pier at the lake ). The journey time of a simple route is about 30 minutes. In addition, there is the opportunity to cross the Grundlsee and the Toplitzsee by motorboat in the course of the 3-lake tour and then hike to the Kammersee.

=== Tourism Association ===
The municipality forms together with Altaussee, Bad Aussee and Bad Mitterndorf the tourism association "Ausseerland-Salzkammergut". Its seat is Bad Aussee.

Despite the rather rough climate described above, Grundlsee is a health resort.

== Sports and leisurework ==
There are twelve sports clubs in Grundlsee.

The surrounding mountains of the Totes Gebirge include a well-marked hiking network, the violet path of the cross-border long-distance trail Via Alpina leads through the municipality. There are also two refuge huts, the Albert-Appel-Haus and the Pühringerhütte.

== Personalities ==
- Johann Matthias Ranftl (1804-1854), painter and graphic artist
- Zerline Gabillon (1834-1892), actress and translator
- Hans von Rebenburg (1834-1917), Austrian industrialist and villa owner in Grundlsee
- Johannes Ude (1874-1965), priest, theologian, life reformer; Honorary citizen of the community Grundlsee
- Rudolf Jeremias Kreutz (1876-1949), writer
- Konrad Mautner (1880-1924), great industrialist, ethnologist and folklorist
- Fritz Warndorfer - Industrialist and financial backer for the Wiener Werkstätte
- Hanns Kobinger (1892-1974), painter of the Grundlsee, lived from 1935 to 1973 with his wife in Grundlsee
- Jenő Takács (1902-2005), composer, pianist, pedagogue
- Paul Dahlke (1904-1984), actor
- Edith Kramer (1916-2014), painter and art therapist
- Karl Bruchhäuser (1917-2005), portrait and landscape painter
- Elfe Gerhart-Dahlke (1919-2007), actress
- Herbert Müller-Hartburg (1925-2011), architect
- Nikolaus Harnoncourt (1929-2016), conductor
- Edith Schreiber-Wicke (born 1943), author of children's and youth books
- Csaba Székely (* 1951), railway manager and traffic economist

== Literature ==
- Reinhard Lamer: The Ausseer Land. History and culture of a landscape. Styria, Graz 1998, ISBN 3-222-12613-5.
- Karl Vocelka: The house and farm names of the Katastralgemeinden Altaussee, Grundlsee, Lupitsch, Obertressen, riders and roads in the Styrian Salzkammergut. Volume 1 (= Dissertations of the University of Vienna, 102). Association of Austrian Societies, Vienna 1974, DNB 200211919.
