= Cantius Stele =

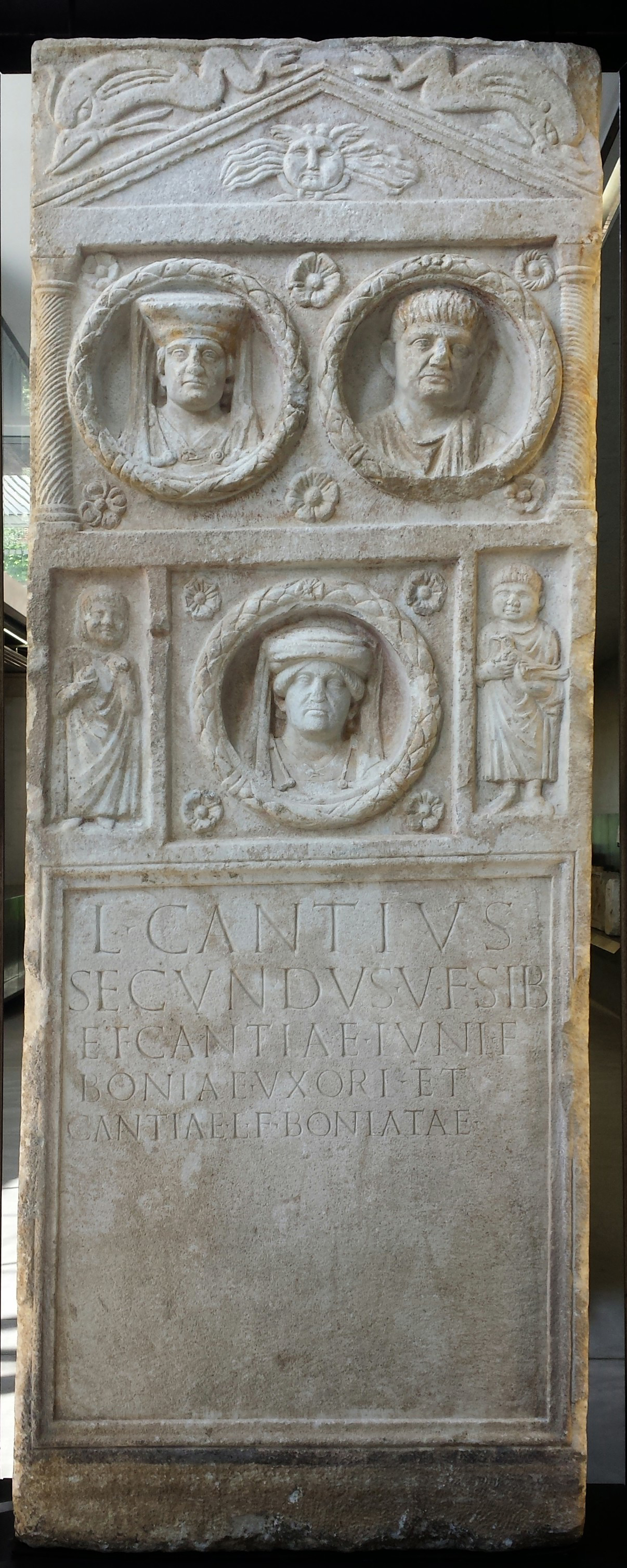
The Cantius-Stele in the Lapidarium of the Archäologiemuseums Schloss Eggenberg

The Cantius Stele is a Roman grave stele in the form of a rectangular aedicula from Noricum, which was created around AD 100.

The stele, which measures 288 by 116 by 29 centimetres (113 in × 46 in × 11 in) is made of Gummern marble and divides into four horizontal sections. The uppermost, the tympanum is composed of a triangular gable with a gorgoneion in the centre and two dolphins facing outwards in the spandrels. Underneath this are laurel wreathed medallions containing portraits of Lucius Cantius Secundus and his wife Cantia Bonia, between two twisting columns. Below this, in a similar but centred medallion is an image of their daughter Cantia Boniata, with an image of a boy to the left and of a girl to the right. The lowest section is the inscription, which reads:

Latin
L(ucius) Cantius / Secundus v(ivus) f(ecit) sib(i) / et Cantiae Iuni(i) f(iliae) / Boniae uxori et / Cantiae L(ucii) f(iliae) Boniatae

CIL III, 5437 & CIL III, 5438

English
Lucius Cantius Secundus made this while still alive for himself and his wife Cantia Bonia daughter of Iunius and for his daughter Cantia Boniata.

The stele was embedded in the outer wall of St Leonhard's, Graz in Graz until 1818, when it was gifted to the collection of the Landesmuseum Joanneum. Today it is kept in the lapidarium of the archaeological museum at Eggenberg Palace.

== Bibliography ==
- Erich Hudeczek (2004). Landesmuseum Joanneum (ed.). Die Römersteinsammlung des Landesmuseums Joanneum. Ein Führer durch das Lapidarium. Graz. pp. 18–19.
