= Great Bullion Famine =

Shortage of gold and silver in 15th-century Europe

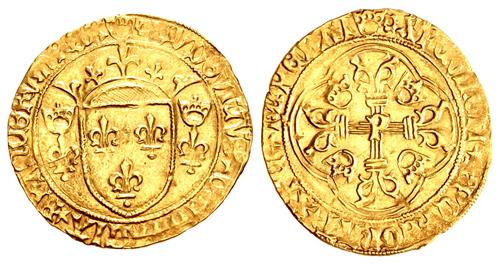
Gold coin of Louis XI of France, minted at Perpignan in 1461 during the worst years of the Great Bullion Famine

The Great Bullion Famine was a shortage of precious metals that struck Europe in the 15th century, with the worst years of the famine being 1457 to 1464. During the Middle Ages, gold and silver coins saw widespread use as currency in Europe and facilitated trade with the Middle East and Asia; the shortage of these metals therefore became a problem for European economies. The main cause for the bullion famine was outflow of silver to the East unequaled by European mining output, although 15th-century contemporaries believed the bullion famine to be caused by hoarding.

The exploration and later discovery of the New World is believed to have been fueled by the bullion famine. The discovery of the Americas with its silver and gold, along with innovations in mining techniques, and the Portuguese gaining access to African gold ended the bullion famine. It had been linked to the wider Crisis of the late Middle Ages.

== Background ==
The main cause for the bullion famine was outflow of silver to the East unequaled by European mining output. The historian John Day supports this theory, stating the loss of gold and silver was due to large-scale trading with the Levant, which provided Europe spices, silks, rare dyestuffs, pearls, and precious gems. The primary markets for these goods were found in Egypt, Syria and Cyprus.

Fifteenth-century contemporaries believed the bullion famine to be caused by hoarding. Şevket Pamuk, professor of economics and economic history, states the bullion famine was exacerbated by the increase in the hoarding of coin. However, the historian Diana Wood states that the silver shortage exacerbated economic problems already caused by war, famine, and plague.

During the first half of the 14th century, European mining more than compensated the bullion loss from trade with the Middle East. Prior to the Black Death, the loss of silver in England was caused by "accident and export". Yet by 1348, the Black Death had slowed silver mining. The mint at Bordeaux suffered a drop in production by fifty percent during the 1380s, and by 1392 French mints were suffering an accelerated decline in silver coining. By contrast, from 1346 to 1384, Flemish mints continued to produce silver groats, yet by 1392 the mint at Ghent had stopped coining and the Bruges mint fell idle in 1402. In the 1390s, the silver mints in Kutná Hora declined and the following Hussite Wars and the Sardinian–Aragonese war put a further strain on the European precious metal supply.

=== France ===
By 1405 French gold crowns were hardly issued at all, and in 1409 Parisian money-changers declared they could not sell bullion to the mint at any price. Even the ducal mints of John, Duke of Burgundy, stopped minting coins by 1432–1434. From 1400 to 1420, gold coins were no longer circulated in Toulouse. In 1414–1415, the Bordelais' Three Estates, faced with reports of a failure of circulating silver, appealed for action to be taken.

=== England ===
The English mint in Durham suffered a decline in output until its closure from 1394 to 1412. By 1411, the English sterling had been devalued to prevent silver loss in trade with Flanders. The London mint's bullion famine was partially mitigated by the reminting of old heavy coins to the new lighter standards which took effect in 1412. While the lightening of the gold English noble occurred from 1421 to 1524. The fine weight of a pound under the reign of Edward IV decreased by 35% compared to its value under Edward III.

=== Italy ===
During the 1370s, the mines in Serbia and Bosnia allowed Venice to avoid the worst of the silver shortage, but the bullion loss drained silver mines in Bohemia and Sardinia as quickly as it was mined.

By 1420, gold was sent to the Fondaco dei Tedeschi in Venice, thence to the mint and then used in trade with the Mamluk Sultanate. The expansion of the Ottoman Empire into the Balkans had worsened the supply of bullion from mines to the rest of Europe, and this expansion exposed Venice to the silver famine until the discovery of new silver mines in northern Europe in the 1450s and 1460s. By 1495, Venice merchants were using copper coinage to conduct trade for spices with the Mamluk Sultanate. Prior to Vasco de Gama's voyage in 1497, Venetian trade exported 300,000 ducats in bullion to Alexandria every year.

=== Holy Roman Empire ===
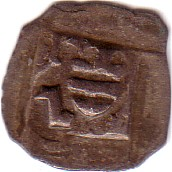
Bad Halser, a Schinderling from Hals (1460)

Throughout the Late Middle Ages, there had been an inflation of different German coins. This led to the rise of new jetons like the pounds and Lübische Mark. The fineness of Vienna pfennige fell from 9⅓ Lot silver during the reign of Rudolf IV (1358–1365) to mere 5 Lot in 1453–1457 under Ladislaus the Posthumous. The exchange course for a Hungarian forint to a Vienna pfennige rose from 150 pfennige in 1400 to 240 in 1455. Even in the 16th century, Hamburg and Lübeck struggled to finance the trade with Livonia and Russia.

Unlike other regions, the inflation in Southern Germany during the mid-15th century was not triggered by a combination of different causes but rather the privatization of the minting rights for short-termed financials profits. To finance his conflict with his brother Albert VI, Frederick III issued the black pfennig in 1457 and the minting rights became more widespread to increase revenue which became example for other South German states. Just in 1459, the fineness fell from 2½ Lot to ½ Lot. The exchange course of the so-called Schinderlinge to Hungarian forint surged from 222 pfennige per forint in early 1458 to 3,686 pfennige in 1460. In 1460, the original situation was restored.

=== Spain ===
Spain suffered an economic crisis due to the bullion famine, and yet the famine, and with it the search for gold, drove the exploration and conquest of the New World. The exchange rate of Maravedí to a Cologne mark rose from 500 in 1390 to 1,000 in 1406 and eventually to 2,250 in 1454.

=== Egypt ===
By 1397–1398, the silver famine had spread to the Mamluk Sultanate which terminated the minting of silver dirhams. Consequently, importing slaves from the Black Sea region was an immense drain on Mamluk coin supply.

=== Ottoman Empire ===
In the Ottoman Empire, despite the capture of Serbian and Bosnian silver mines, Mehmed II imposed strict laws to limit silver circulation. Any bullion produced or imported to the Ottoman Empire was to be submitted to the mint and coined. Included in this law was the employment of yasakci kuls (silver seekers) who were authorized to search any and all persons and places and confiscate silver. Despite these measures the Ottoman Empire also suffered from the silver famine.

== Famine ==
The bullion famine caused a European economic recession that only the Portuguese and Low Countries were capable of surviving. During the 15th century, silver bullion became so rare that commodities were used in place of coin. European trade, c.1410, was crippled by the bullion famine and barely improved by the time the second bullion famine struck in c.1440.

Barter became so commonplace that the spice pepper was used in place of bullion, with the Germans calling their bankers peppermen. In England, the lack of bullion brought about a barter system, in response Edward IV of England passed an act in 1464, stating that carders, spinners, weavers, and fullers were to be paid lawful money for their wages; continued complaints by the cloth industry indicate this act was neglected.

In France people resorted to barter by 1420, and a barter system was improvised based on the value of commodities, if one commodity were deemed more expensive than the other, the difference was topped off with a payment of money.

As the bullion supply worsened, mining and refining techniques were improved. Georgius Agricola in his work, De re metallica, recorded these techniques. It also drove shipwrights to enhance the ability of merchant ships to extend their trading range. These naval advances were copied by the Genoans for their merchant vessels.

The discovery and later exploration of America is believed to have been fueled by the bullion famine. Columbus's voyage was motivated by the search for gold, being mentioned in his diary sixty-five times. The Portuguese exploration of Africa and a trade route to India via the Cape of Good Hope was similarly fueled by the famine.

== Restoration ==
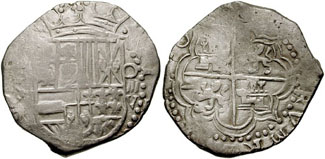
Spanish colonial coin of Philip II, minted in Potosí (modern-day Bolivia), struck c. 1580

The discovery of the New World and with it silver from Mexico and Peru ended the bullion famine by 1550. Pieper supports this thesis, stating the Caribbean gold mines were exploited and thus ended the European bullion famine. Moyk Lieberman states that an increase in bullion, the reopening of old mines, and a resurgence in population allowed mine production to remain constant, which also assisted in ending the bullion famine. Even as early as the 1440s, Portugal was able to bolster its economy by trading for African gold bullion.

== See also ==
- Gresham's law
- Great Slump
- Mining and metallurgy in medieval Europe
- Age of Discovery
- Spanish Price Revolution

== Sources ==
- Allen, Larry, ed. (2009). "Great Bullion Famine". The Encyclopedia of Money (2nd ed.). ABC-CLIO.
- Allen, Martin (2012). Mints and Money in Medieval England. Cambridge University Press.
- Blackmore, Robert (2020). Government and Merchant Finance in Anglo-Gascon Trade, 1300–1500. Palgrave Macmillan.
- Blanchard, Ian (2001). Mining, Metallurgy, and Minting in the Middle Ages: Continuing Afro-European Supremacy, 1250-1450. F. Steiner.
- Campbell, B. M. S. (2016). The Great Transition. Cambridge University Press.
- Cervantes, Fernando (2021). Conquistadores: A New History of Spanish Discovery and Conquest. Penguin.
- Day, John (1978). "The Great Bullion Famine of the Fifteenth Century". Past & Present (79 (May)). Oxford University Press: 3–54. doi:10.1093/past/79.1.3. JSTOR 650246.
- Derix, Hans-Heribert (2019). "Geldordnung und Münzverschlechterungen im Mittelalter". Säkulare Inflation, kompetitive Geldordnung und »unbeschränkte Demokratie« (in German). Walter de Gruyter. pp. 199–222. ISBN 9783110511888.
- Dyer, Christopher (2003). Making a Living in the Middle Ages: The People of Britain 850–1520. Yale University Press. ISBN 9780300167078.
- Findlay, Ronald; O'Rourke, Kevin H. (2007). Power and Plenty: Trade, War, and the World Economy in the Second Millennium. Princeton University Press.
- Fuess, Albrecht (2019). "How to Cope with Scarcity of Commodities? The Mamluks' Quest for Metal". In Amitai, Reuven; Conermann, Stephan (eds.). The Mamluk Sultanate from the Perspective of Regional and World History: Economic, Social and Cultural Development in an Era of Increasing International Interaction and Competition. Bonn University Press.
- Kindleberger, Charles (1984). A Financial History of Western Europe. George Allen & Unwin.
- Lane, Kris (2021). Potosi: The Silver City That Changed the World. University of California Press.
- Lieberman, Victor (2009). Strange Parallels. Vol. Mainland Mirrors: Europe, Japan, China, Southeast Asia in Global, c.800-1830. Cambridge University Press.
- Lundahl, Mats (2013). The Political Economy of Disaster: Destitution, Plunder and Earthquake in Haiti. Taylor & Francis.
- Northe, Michael (1998). "Bilanzen und Edelmetall im hansischen Rußlandhandel". In Nitsche, Peter (ed.). Zwischen Christianisierung und Europäisierung (in German). Franz Steiner Verlag. pp. 415–422. ISBN 9783515072663.
- Pamuk, Şevket (2000). A Monetary History of the Ottoman Empire. Cambridge University Press.
- Pieper, Renate (2003). "Bullion". In Mokyr, Joel (ed.). The Oxford Encyclopedia of Economic History. Vol. 5. Oxford University Press.
- Spufford, Peter (1993). Money and Its Use in Medieval Europe. Cambridge University Press.
- Wood, Diana (2002). Medieval Economic Thought. Cambridge University Press.
