= Casey McKee =

American painter

Casey McKee (born 1976, Mesa, Arizona is an American artist based in Germany.

McKee's work has appeared in many exhibitions such as Unpacking Ego at Space K Museum in Seoul, South Korea the National Arts Club in New York and "UN/FAIR TRADE - Die Kunst der Gerechtigkeit" at the Neue Galerie Graz am Landesmuseum Joanneum in Graz, Austria. His work has been featured multiple times in the Ostrale Biennale in Dresden, Germany, NordArt at the Kunstwerk Karlshütte; Büdelsdorf, Germany as well as in the 4th Moscow Biennale of Contemporary Art in Moscow, Russia..

Working with oil paint on canvas, his works tend to be critiques on power structures and societal norms. He often uses humour or absurdity as an entry point into the subjects that he is working with.

McKee has spent most of his professional career in Berlin, Germany. He now resides in a small village in the German countryside.

McKee's work is included in the permanent collections of Space K Museum Seoul, South Korea, the Scottsdale Museum of Contemporary Art – SmoCA, Scottsdale, Arizona, The Phoenix Art Museum Phoenix, Arizona, The Tucson Museum of Contemporary Art Tucson, Arizona, the Phynque Phamily Phoundation museum Minneapolis, Minnesota, the SØR Rusche Oelde/Berlin Collection in Berlin, Germany, The National Arts Club in New York, New York and the Ömer Koç Collection, Istanbul, Turkey.
