= Saint Lambert's Abbey =

Benedictine monastery in Styria, Austria

Coordinates: 47°04′06″N 14°17′54″E

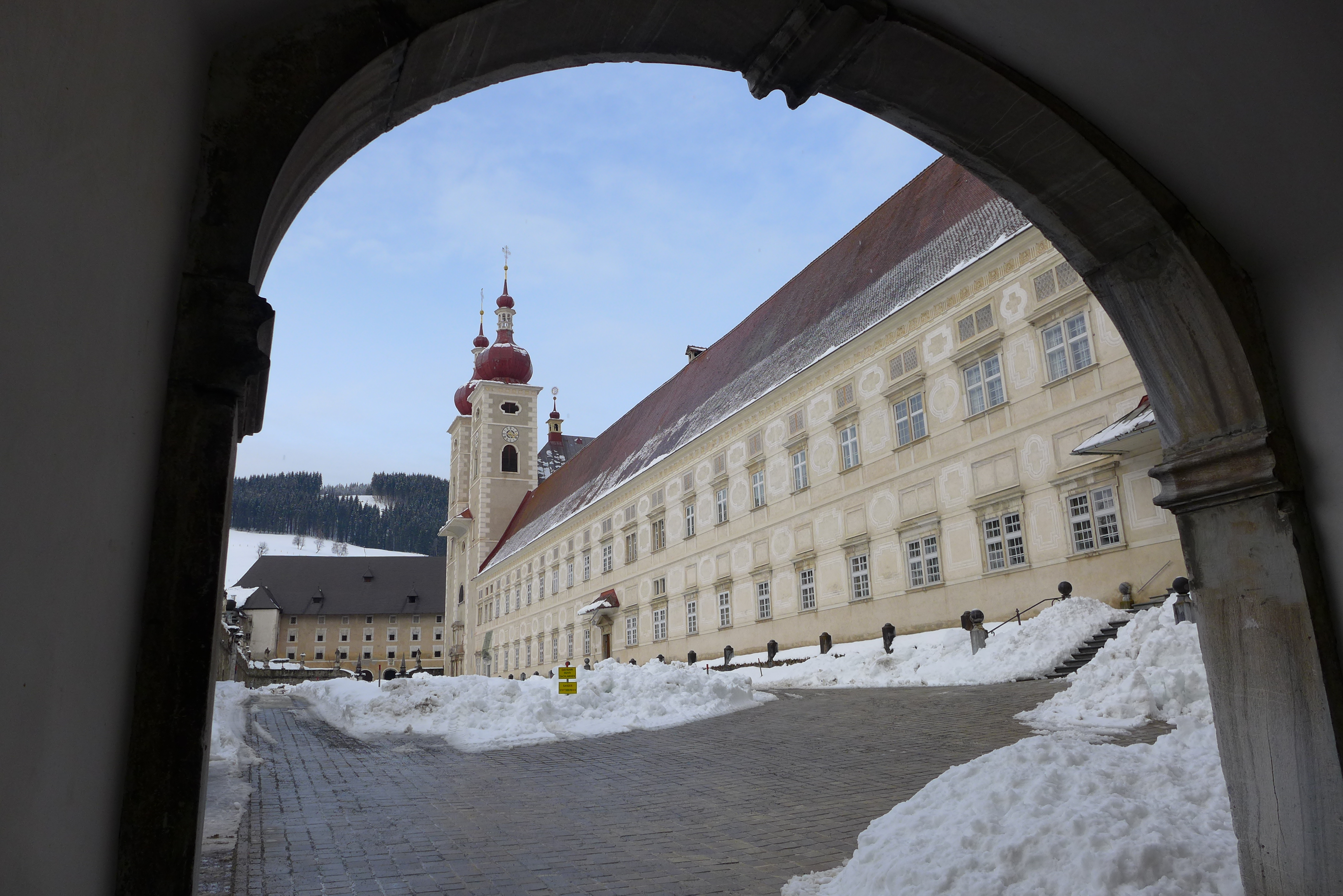
St. Lambrecht's Abbey in winter

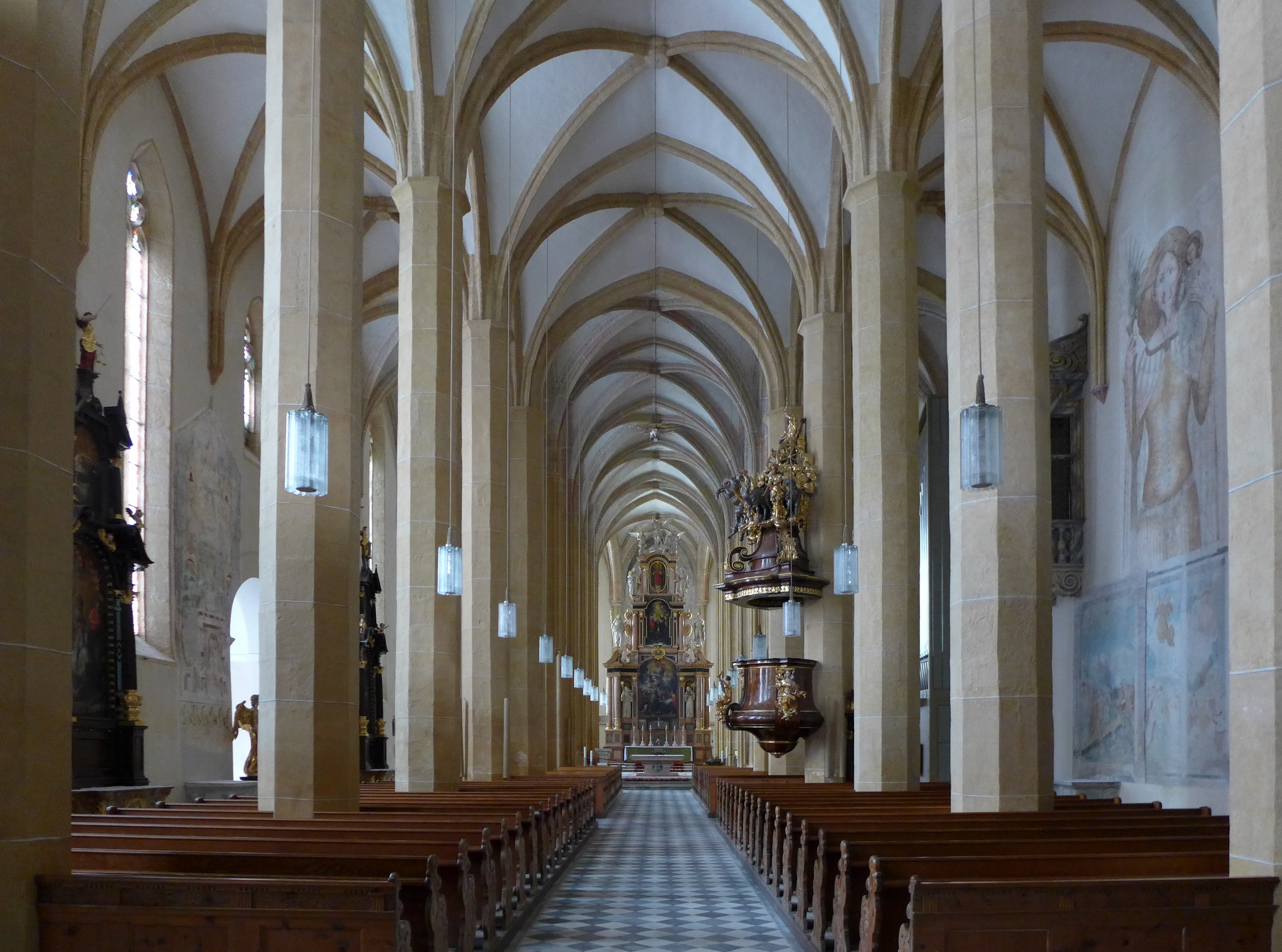
The interior of the Gothic Abbey Church

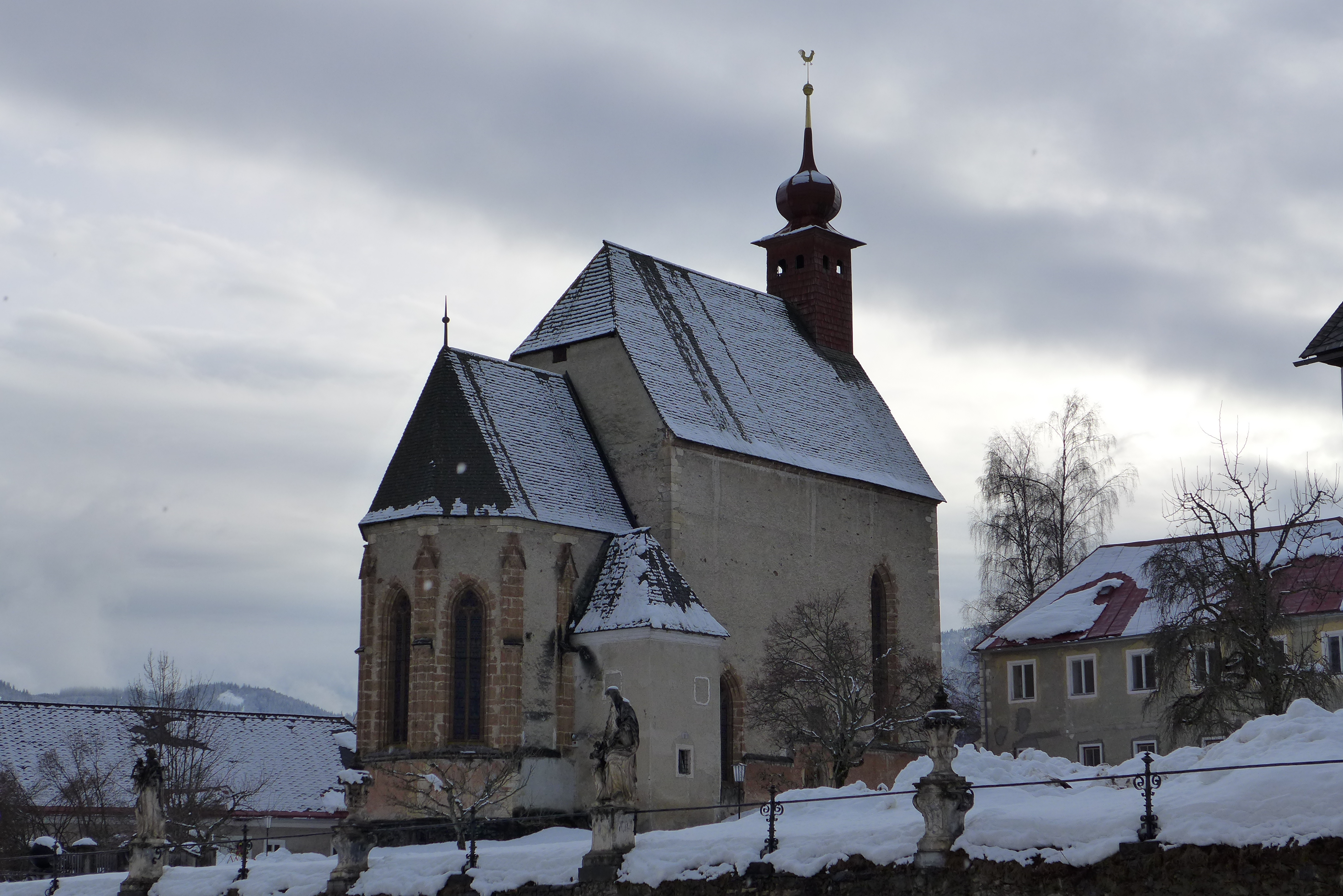
St. Peter's Church

St. Lambert's Abbey (German: Stift St. Lambrecht) is a Benedictine Abbey in the village of Sankt Lambrecht in the Styrian Grebenzen nature reserve in Austria. The monastery is located 1,072 m (3,517 ft) above sea level. The monastery complex and its gardens are part of the Zirbitzkogel-Grebenzen nature park.

== History ==
The monastery was founded in 1076 by Count Markward IV of Eppenstein, Margrave of Styria; it was dissolved from 1786 to 1803. In 1938, the building was seized by the National Socialists. From 1942 to 1945, it was used as an external storage facility of the Mauthausen-Gusen concentration camp. The monks returned in 1946.

The two churches within the monastic grounds are called the Abbey Church (German: Stiftskirche) and St. Peter's Church (German: Peterskirche). During restoration work on the Abbey Church in the early 1970s extraordinary frescoes dating from the latter half of the 15th century were discovered on the north wall. These show the throne of Solomon. On the lowest level is depicted the Old Testament Judgment of Solomon, above this the Virgin Mary with the baby Jesus, and above all else Jesus Christ: "the Word of God made Flesh" (logos). Other frescoes dating from the 14th century depict Saint Christopher and Saint Agnes. Formerly in the monastery there was also a votive altarpiece from which the Master of the Saint Lambrecht Votive Altarpiece received his name; this is now on loan in the Alte Galerie in Graz.

The abbey is a member of the Austrian Congregation within the Benedictine Confederation.

== Landmarks ==
- The early Baroque monastic buildings
- The monastery museum with its art collection
- The folklore museum of Father Romuald Pramberger and the bird museum of Father Blasius Hanf
- The Gothic Abbey Church
- Saint Peter's Church (founded 1424)
