= Master of the Saint Lambrecht Votive Altarpiece =

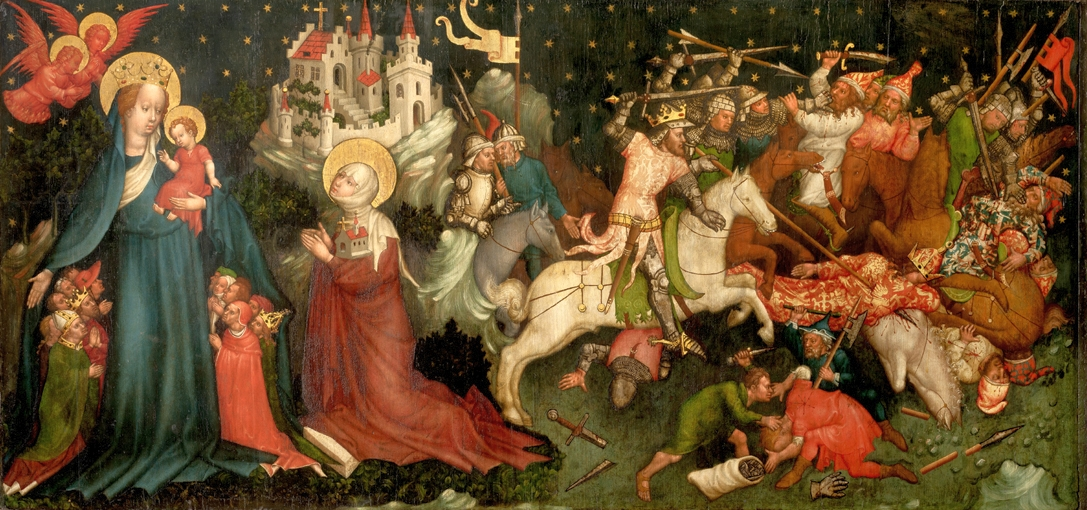
Votive panel from Saint Lambert's Abbey, The Virgin of Mercy (c. 1430). In the collection of the Landesmuseum Joanneum, Graz, Austria

The Master of the Saint Lambrecht Votive Altarpiece was an Austrian painter active between about 1410 and 1440. His name is derived from a panel, formerly in Saint Lambert's Abbey in the village of Sankt Lambrecht in Styria. This, now in the Alte Galerie in Graz, depicts a former abbot of the monastery, Heinrich Moyker, kneeling before the Virgin of Mercy; with him is Hemma of Gurk. Moyker was the donor of the altarpiece, which depicts the Hungarian victory over the Ottoman Turks. A number of other paintings are believed to be by his hand, as is the design of a stained glass window in Sankt Lambrecht; some of these have also been ascribed to the so-called Master of the Linz Crucifixion, while others are believed to be by Hans von Judenburg or Hans von Tübingen. The latter appears to have lived too late to be identified with the Master's oeuvre. Stylistically, the Master's ascribed body of work indicates a familiarity with International Gothic as practiced in Bohemia. Other stylistic traits suggest knowledge of the work being done in Cologne and Westphalia, while still others show aspects of the Viennese, French, and Burgundian schools.
