= Johann Michael Rottmayr =

Austrian painter (1656–1730)

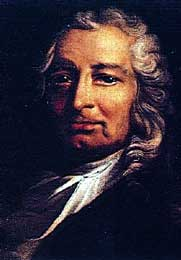
- Rottmayr (Self-portrait)
- Born: 11 December 1656; Laufen an der Salzach
- Died: 25 October 1730 (aged 73); Mougins, France
- Education: Johann Carl Loth
- Known for: Painting
- Movement: Baroque

Johann Michael Rottmayr (11 December 1656 – 25 October 1730) was an Austrian painter.

== Biography ==
Rottmayr was born in Laufen an der Salzach, Bavaria. Along with his Laufen-born contemporary, Hans Adam Weissenkircher, he received his education from Johann Carl Loth in Venice. Just as Weissenkircher had brought the Italian Renaissance to the Southern Alps and the court of the Princes of Eggenberg in Graz, Rottmayr brought it north of the Alps. From 1689 onwards, he worked in Salzburg, and was employed as the general painter of the Prince-Bishop of Salzburg.

== Gallery ==
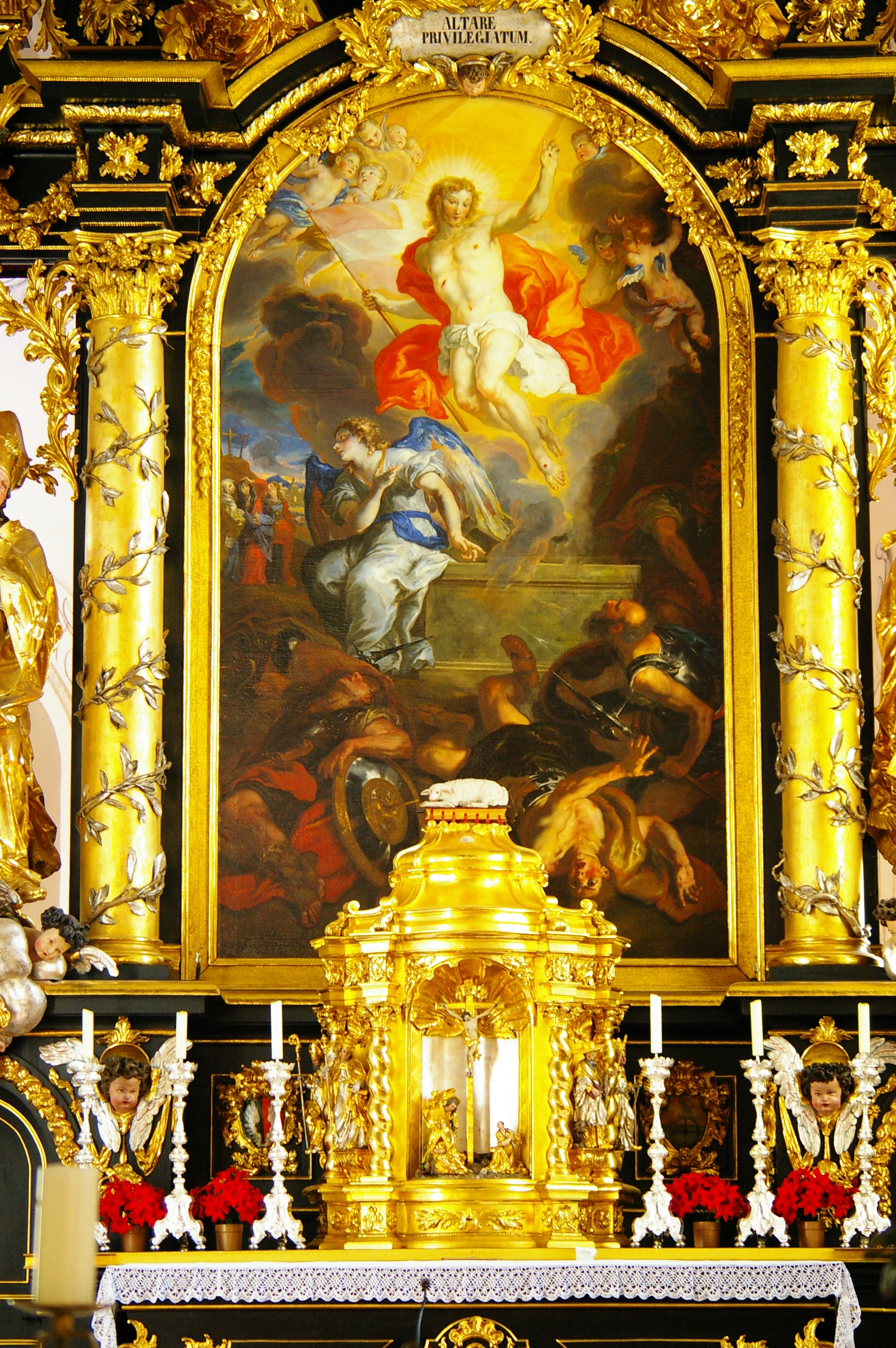

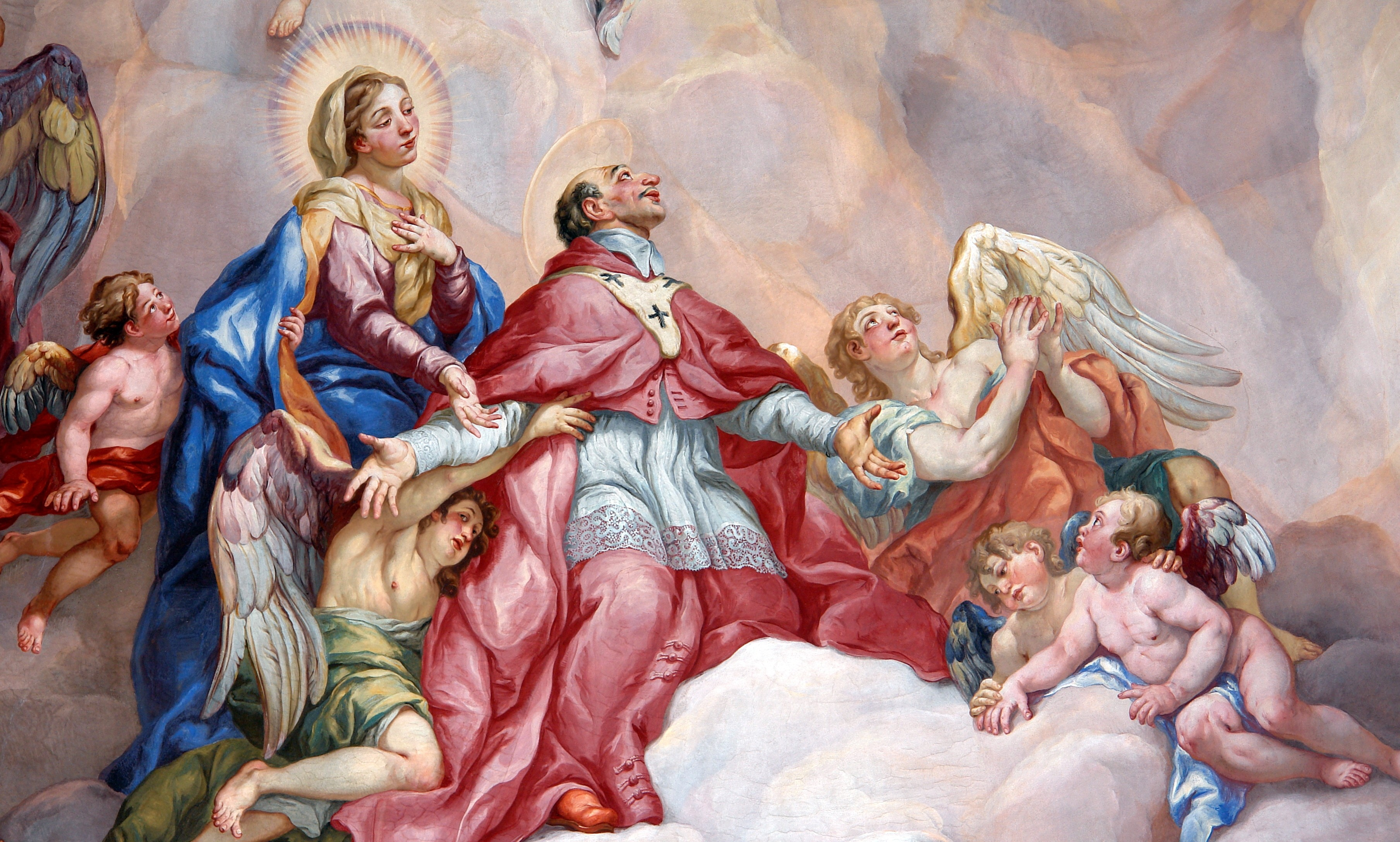
Intercession of Charles Borromeo supported by the Virgin Mary (Karlskirche, Vienna)

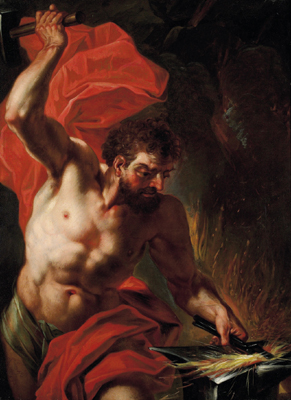
Vulcan (Lausanne Private Collection)

== See also ==
Melk Abbey commemorative coin featuring a painting of Johann Michael

Johann Michael Rottmayr painted the inside of the central dome of the Melk Abbey. This particular painting was recently selected as the main motif of a very high-value collectors' coin: the Austrian Melk Abbey commemorative coin, minted on April 18, 2007. The reverse side gives a view up into the central dome of the church, with its typical vision of heaven.
