= Hans von Tübingen =

Austrian artist (1380–1462)

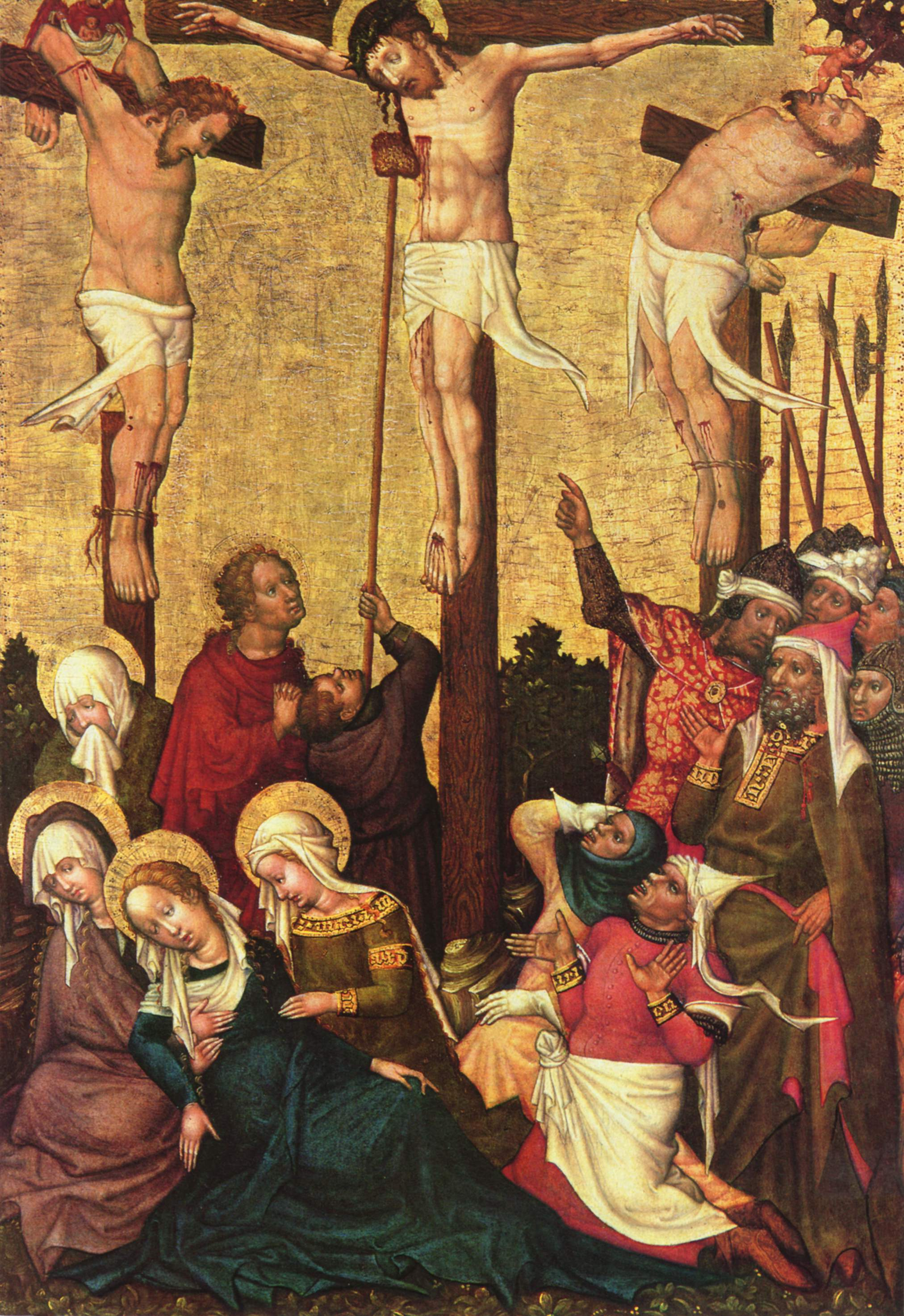
Hans von Tübingen, Crucifixion, 1430

Hans von Tübingen (1380 – February 1462) was an Austrian artist.

Very little is known about his life, save that his work bears the influence of contemporary Burgundian and French painting. His name is known by signatures on some of his works. His output is sometimes conflated with that of the Master of the Saint Lambrecht Votive Altarpiece. He may also have been active as an etcher and painter of glass.
