= Balthasar Eggenberger =

Balthasar Eggenberger (died 1493), was an Austrian entrepreneur in the early days of mercantilism. He was master of the imperial mint at Graz in the Duchy of Styria and financier to Frederick III, Holy Roman Emperor. He was a man cut of the same cloth as the likes of the Burgundian chancellor Nicolas Rolin, French merchant Jacques Coeur and the Medici of Italy, whose cunning, ambition and skills allowed them to advance into the ranks of the nobility from mere common ancestry in the late Middle Ages and early modern era. His activities laid an important foundation stone for the ascension of the House of Eggenberg.

== Biography ==
The exact date of birth of Balthasar Eggenberger has been lost but he was born the son of Ulrich Eggenberger sometime in the early to mid-15th century. Like most successful men of the era, Balthasar displayed the contrary character of being, on the one hand, an unscrupulous and ambitious merchant, while on the other, being extremely pious. In 1451, to help secure the salvation of his immortal soul, he established the Eckennperger Stift. This was a hospital for the poor to which he later funded the addition of a small Chapel of All Saints and a family crypt. He was a cunning businessman who laid the foundations for the ascension of the merchant house to a noble house through his friendship with king Matthias Corvinus of Hungary. Although Corvinus was an arch-rival of Frederick III, Holy Roman Emperor, Balthasar also succeeded in the court of the emperor as his chief financier and master of the imperial mint. In 1460 Balthasar bought land on the western outskirts of the town of Graz and established the family residence there with the minting business as well as dedicating a Gothic chapel to the Virgin Mary which was recognized in a papal indulgence dated 30 May 1470. But, like Jacques Coeur, Eggenberger's fall from power when he lost favor with the emperor was as dramatic as his rise through his friendship with Matthias Corvinus had been.

=== Origin of the Eggenberg Coat of arms ===
The earliest known references to a coat of arms for the House of Eggenberg can be traced back to 1479. The coat-of-arms consists of a shield with three crowned ravens bearing a crown in their beaks. The ravens are thought to have been included as a reference to the King of Hungary, Matthias Corvinus, whose last name in Latin translates as "raven" and who likely granted the merchant the already noble coat of arms. The coat of arms appears at various sites throughout central Europe that once were in the possession of the Eggenberg's. This includes on Balthasar's tombstone, contrary to all convention of the time for those not born into the nobility. This tombstone can be seen today in the Gothic chapel dedicated to the Virgin Mary at the heart of Schloss Eggenberg alongside the more-than-500-year-old Eggenberger altarpiece which Balthasar commissioned for his private chapel.

=== Mint master and financier to the emperor ===
In the 1450s Balthasar became financier to Frederick III finally establishing the family business of minting somewhere along the Sackstraße in Graz. The emperor deeded him land and, by 1460, he had established the family residence at the "Castrum Eckenperg" on the western outskirts of Graz. As a private entrepreneur leasing the business of minting the imperial currency from the emperor, Eggenberg made a profit only if the value of the coins as currency was higher than the cost of production. When the emperor raised taxes or prices or the cost of the lease, this cut into Eggenberger's profits. Therefore, around 1459, as a profit oriented business man in the days of protocapitalism, he reduced the amount of silver in the coins to such a low level that the coins became nearly worthless; all the while Eggenberger managed to amass a large private fortune. The people took to calling the worthless coins "Schinderling" and farmers would no longer accept them as currency. This precipitated a financial collapse and forced the emperor to attempt to seize Eggenberger, who had heard about the warrant and fled with very large sums of money in that time, nearly 40,000 pound, to Venice in the early part of 1460. However, Eggenberger and the emperor came to some sort of arrangement, the exact details of which have been lost to history, and in May 1460 Eggenberger returned to the family residence in Graz. He once again took up operations as the master of the mint for the emperor. He was, however, not able to stay within the good graces of the emperor for reasons that remain a mystery even today and died in the dungeons of the Schlossberg in 1493.

== Balthasar Eggenberger’s residence ==
The medieval residence of Balthasar Eggenberger went on to become the core of the 17th-century palace, Schloss Eggenberg, built by Eggenberger's great-grandson, Hans Ulrich von Eggenberg. The former rooms of Balthasar now fittingly house the numismatic collections of the Styrian Universalmuseum Joanneum which now operates Eggenberg Palace as a park and museum.

== Sources ==
- Die Fürsten und Freiherren zu Eggenberg und ihre Vorfahren. By Walther Ernest Heydendorff. Graz: Verlag Styria, 1965.
- Schloss Eggenberg. By Barbara Kaiser. Graz: Christian Brandstätter Verlag, 2006. ISBN 3-902510-80-3 (English Edition) or ISBN 3-902510-96-X (German Edition) (available in German or English editions through the Universal Museum Joanneum
- Das Joanneum – Österreichs Universalmuseum [documentary film DVD] By Günther Schilhan (director) & Helmut Gesslbauer (producer), Austria: ORF Steiermark, 2006.
- Planet Eggenberg. By Hermann Götz. Graz: Landesmuseum Joanneum / Leykam Medien AG, 2005.
