= Johann Carl Loth =

German painter

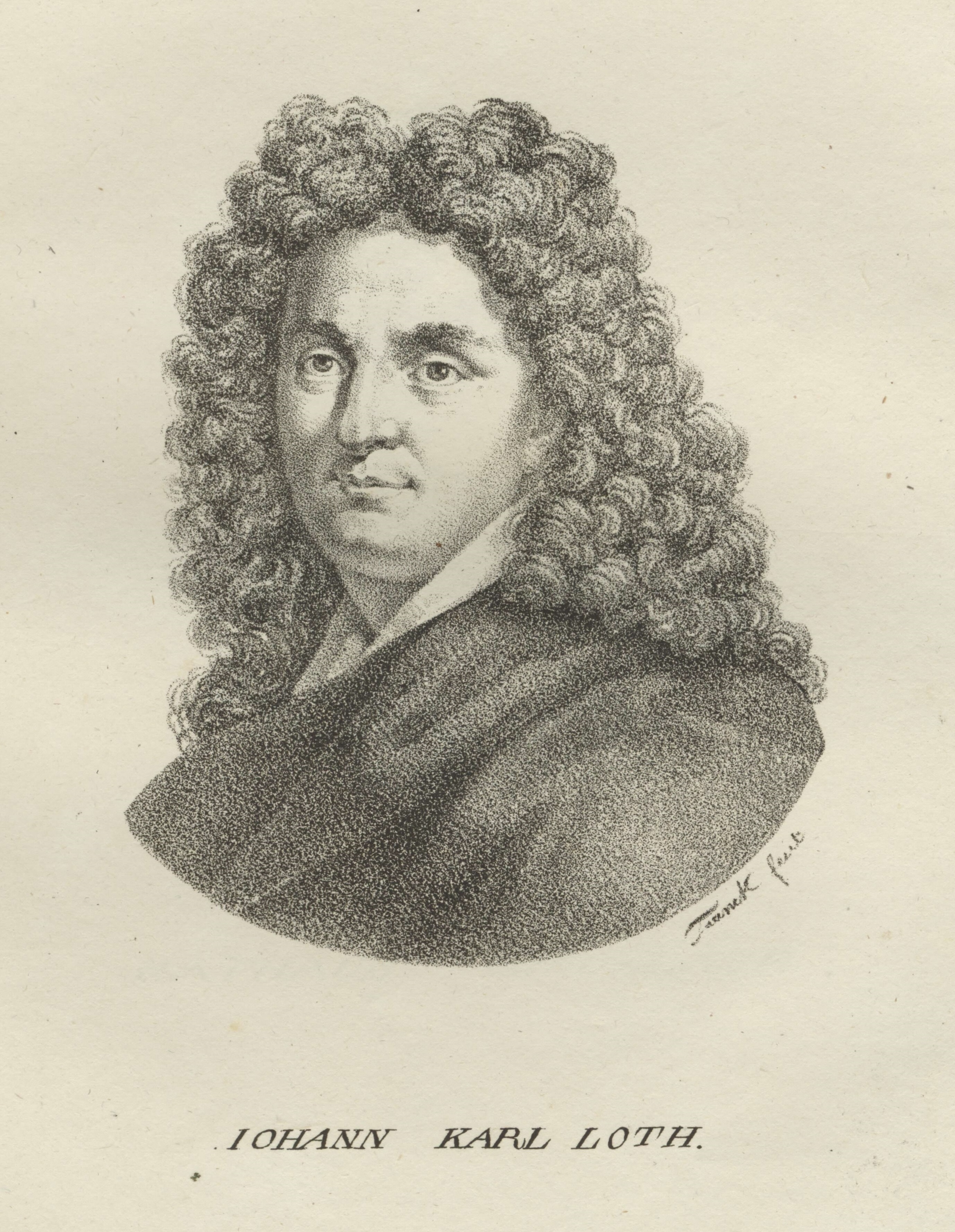
Johann Carl Loth, lithograph from the Deutsche Künstler-Gallerie by Maximilian Franck

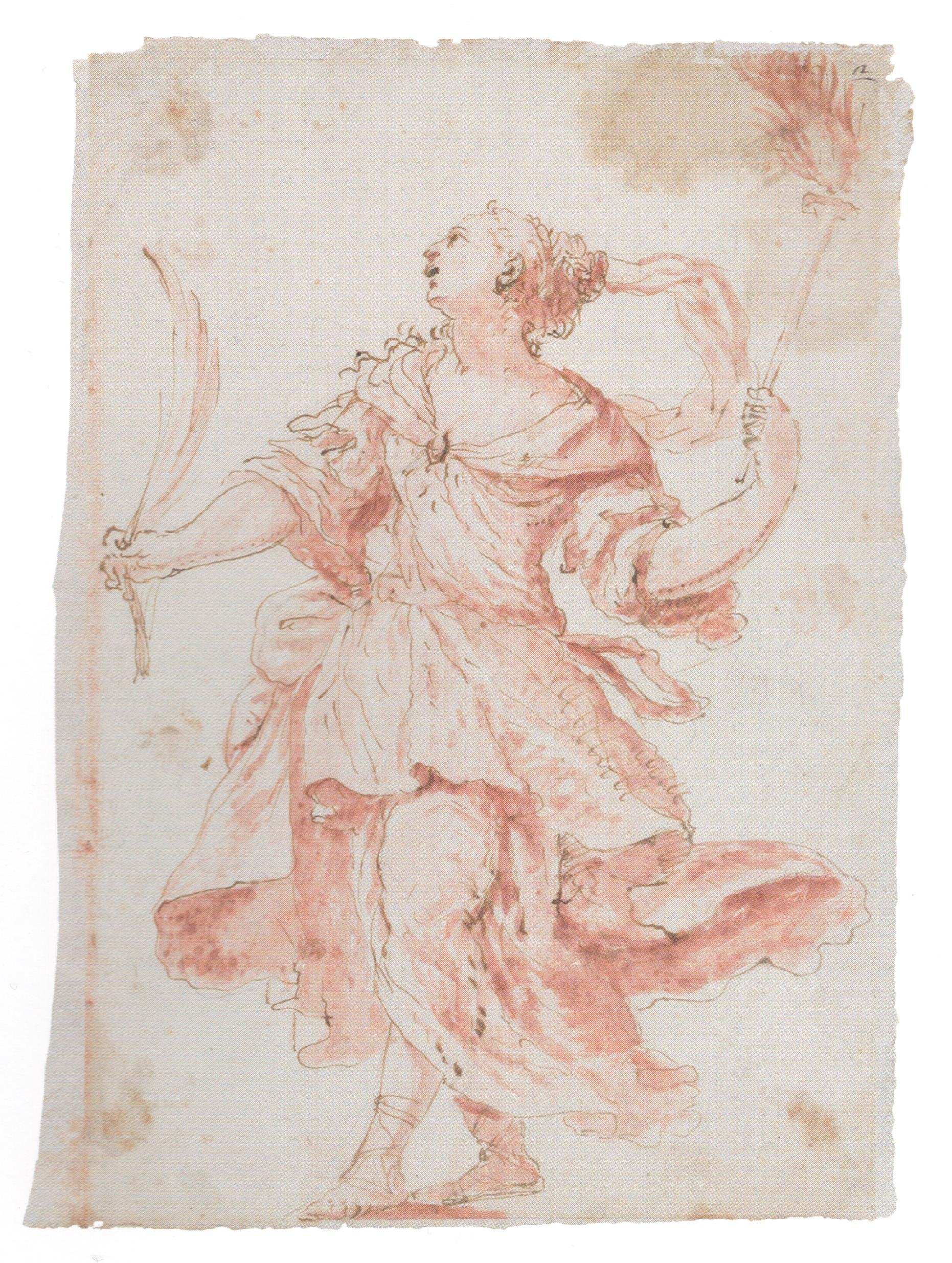
Allegory of Victory, sanguine

Johann Carl Loth (Baptized 8 August 1632 – 6 October 1698) was a German Baroque painter who spent most of his life in Venice. His name is also rendered as Johann Karl, Karel and, in Italy, Carlotto or Carlo Lotti.

He specialized in history paintings; generally crowded group scenes. His subjects were typically from classical mythology or the Old Testament.

== Biography ==
He was born in Munich, in the Electorate of Bavaria. According to the biographer, Arnold Houbraken, he was one of the three grand masters of art named "Karel", or "Carl" (the other two were Karel Dujardin and Karel Marat, usually called Carlo Maratta).

He was the son and pupil of Johann Ulrich Loth and was possibly influenced by Giovan Battista Langetti. He was once commissioned to paint for the emperor Leopold I in Vienna and worked together with Pietro Liberi in Venice, where he lived from 1663 until his death in 1698. His brother Franz (1639–1710) was also a painter in Venice and Germany and often collaborated with Carl.

He had numerous pupils, including Michael Wenzel Halbax, Santo Prunati, Johann Michael Rottmayr, Hans Adam Weissenkircher, Daniel Seiter, and Baron Peter Strudel.

== Popularity among Dutch artists ==
He attracted well-to-do artists, such as Cornelis de Bruijn and Jan van Bunnik, who made trips especially to visit his studio. Willem Drost and Jan Vermeer van Utrecht were among his close friends. He is buried in the church of San Luca, Venice.

== Collections ==
His works are mostly in Germany and Italy. Other museums with works by Loth include the Art Institute of Chicago and the National Gallery, London. Burghley House in England has two large paintings in the chapel.

Isaac Blessing Jacob is on long-term loan to the Skirball Cultural Center in Los Angeles, having recently been reclaimed by the Bloch family, originally from Brno, Czechoslovakia.

In 2023 a Loth painting that had been looted by the Nazis was found after a search of more than 80 years by the family of Jewish Czech industrialist Johann Bloch. Changes in the title and attribution had made the search particularly difficult.

== Gallery ==
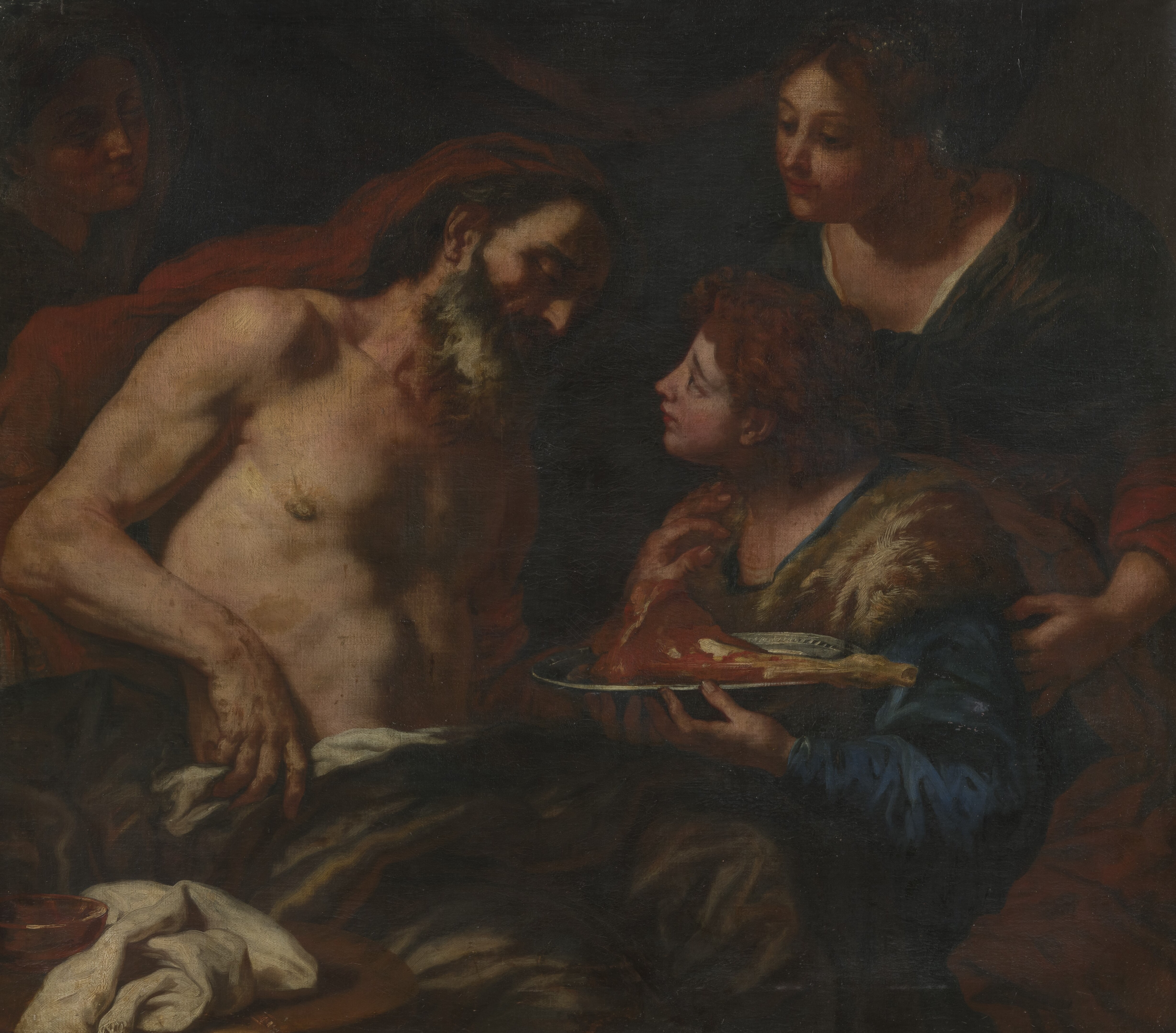
Isaac Blessing Jacob (Skirball Cultural Center)

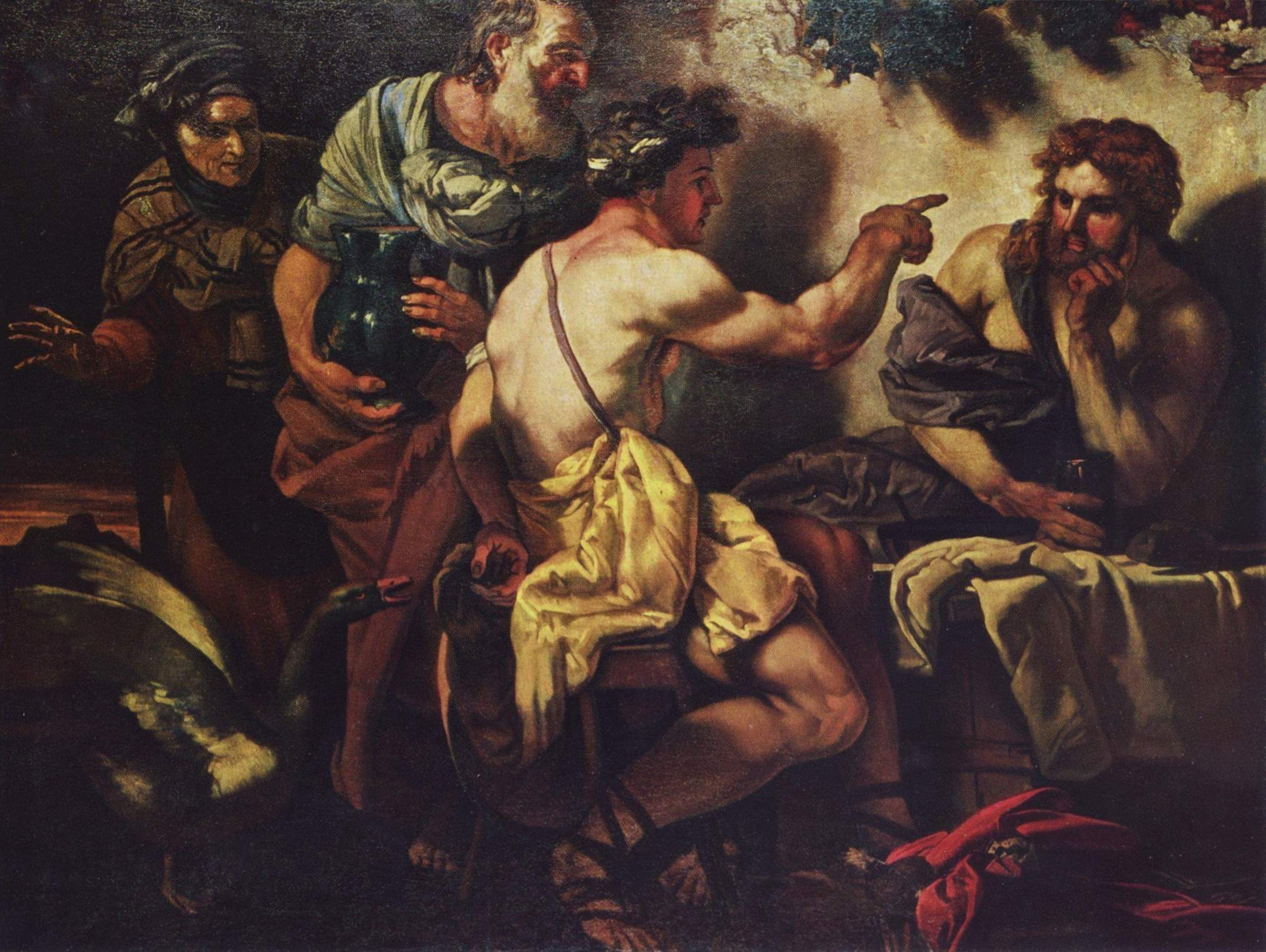
Jupiter and Mercury with Philemon and Baucis, 1659 (Kunsthistorisches Museum)

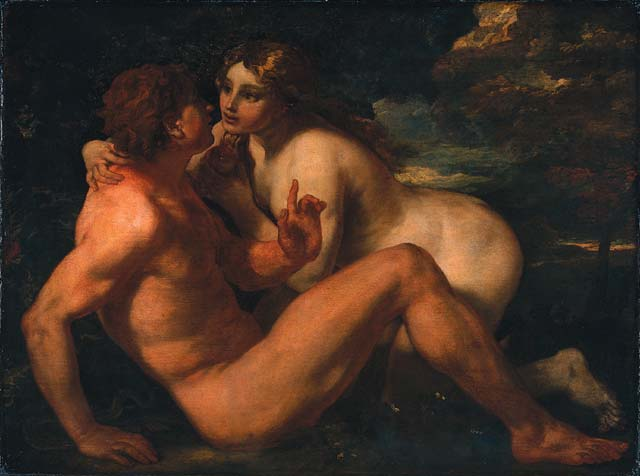
Eve Tempting Adam, National Gallery of Canada

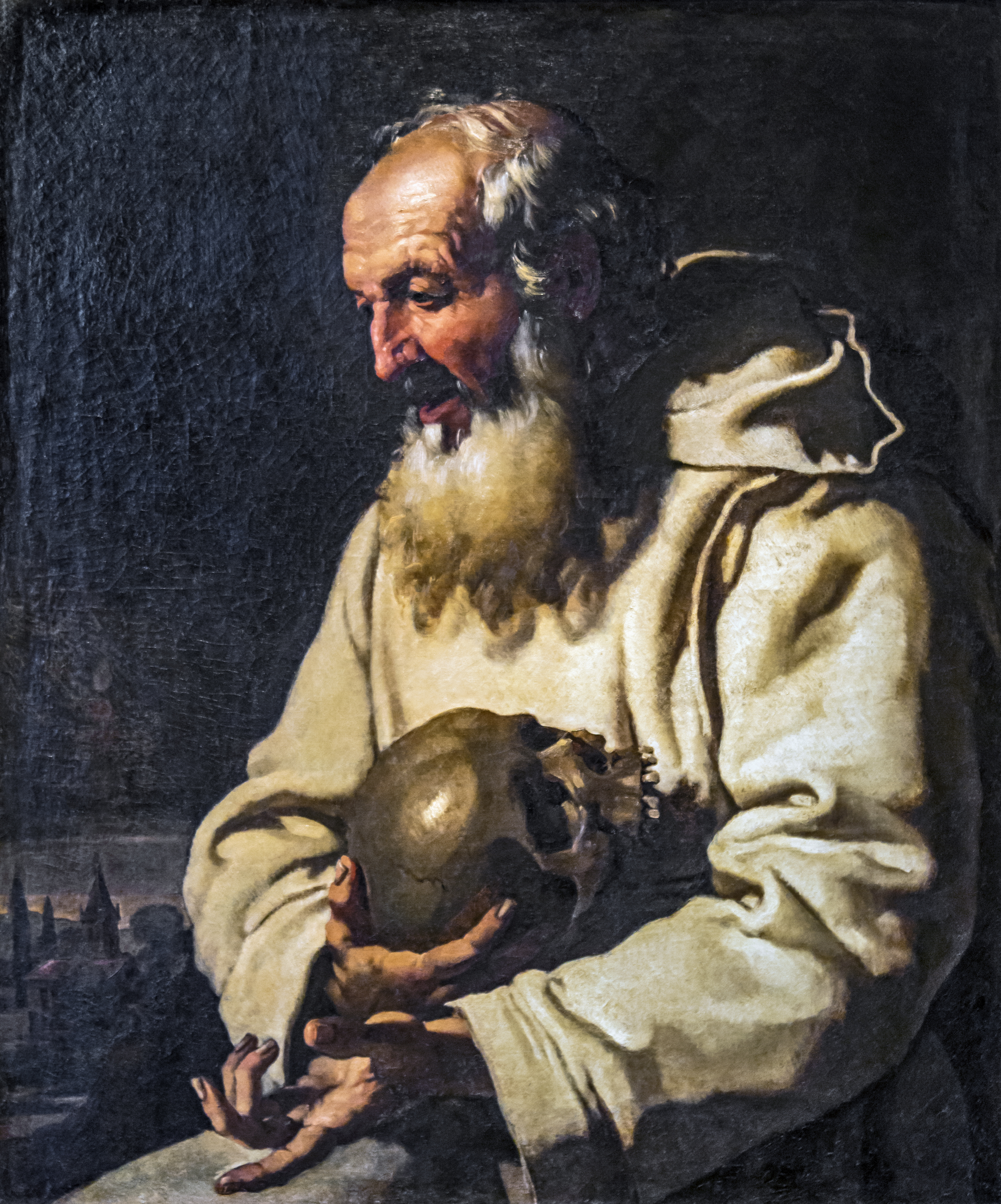
Saint Romuald, Gallerie dell'Accademia Venice

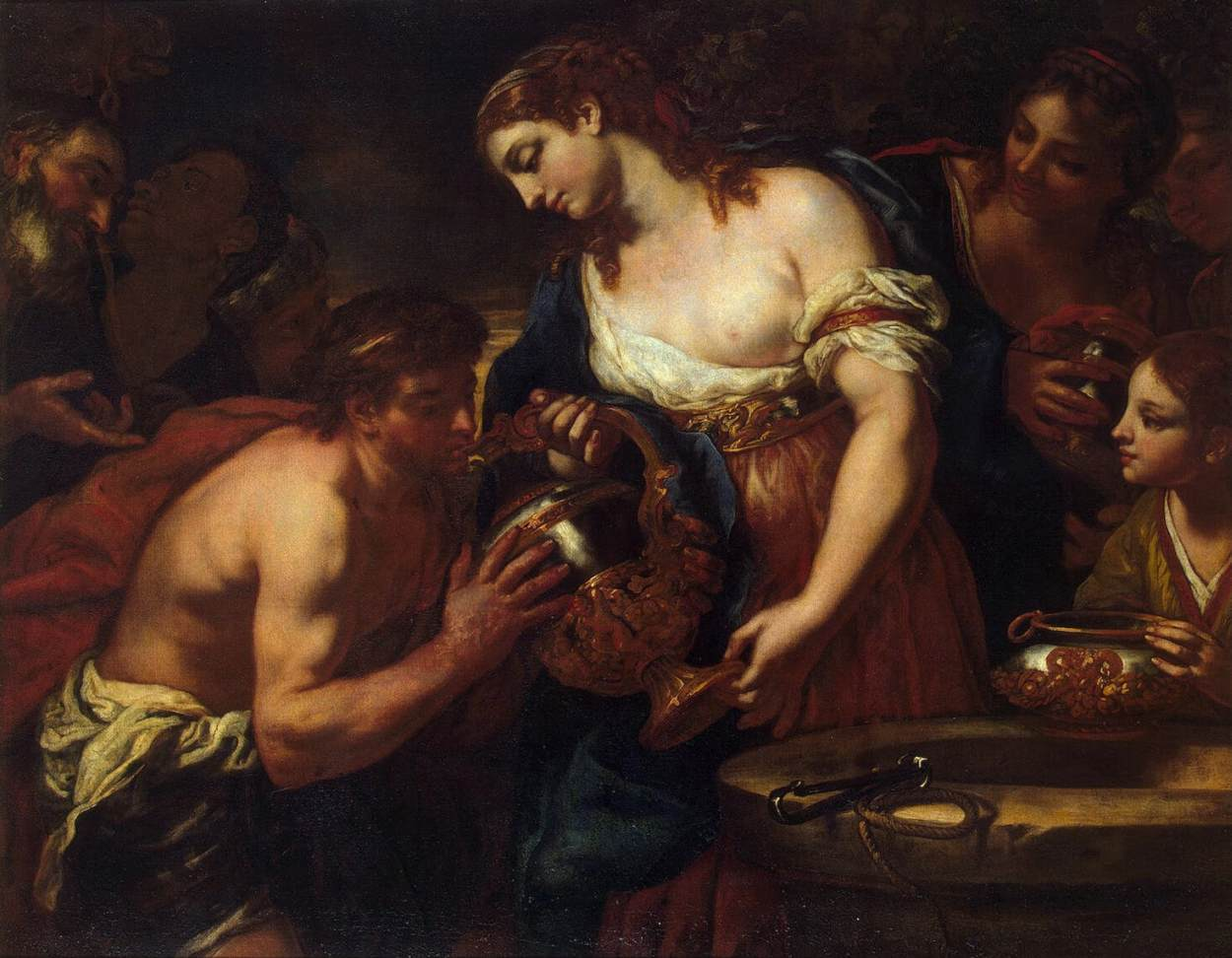
Eliezer and Rebecca at the Well

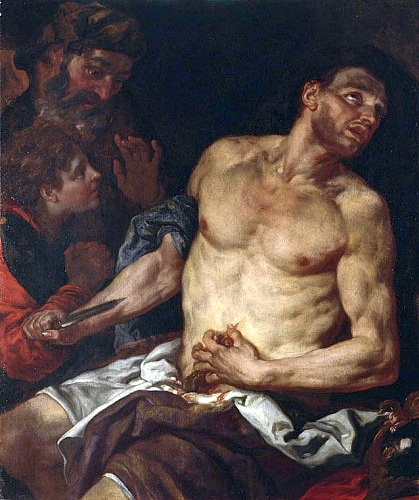
Death of Cato the Younger

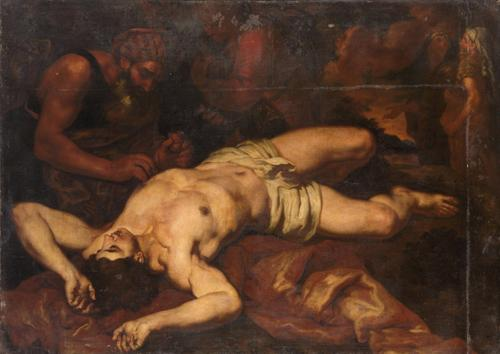
Adam Weeping
over the Death of Abel

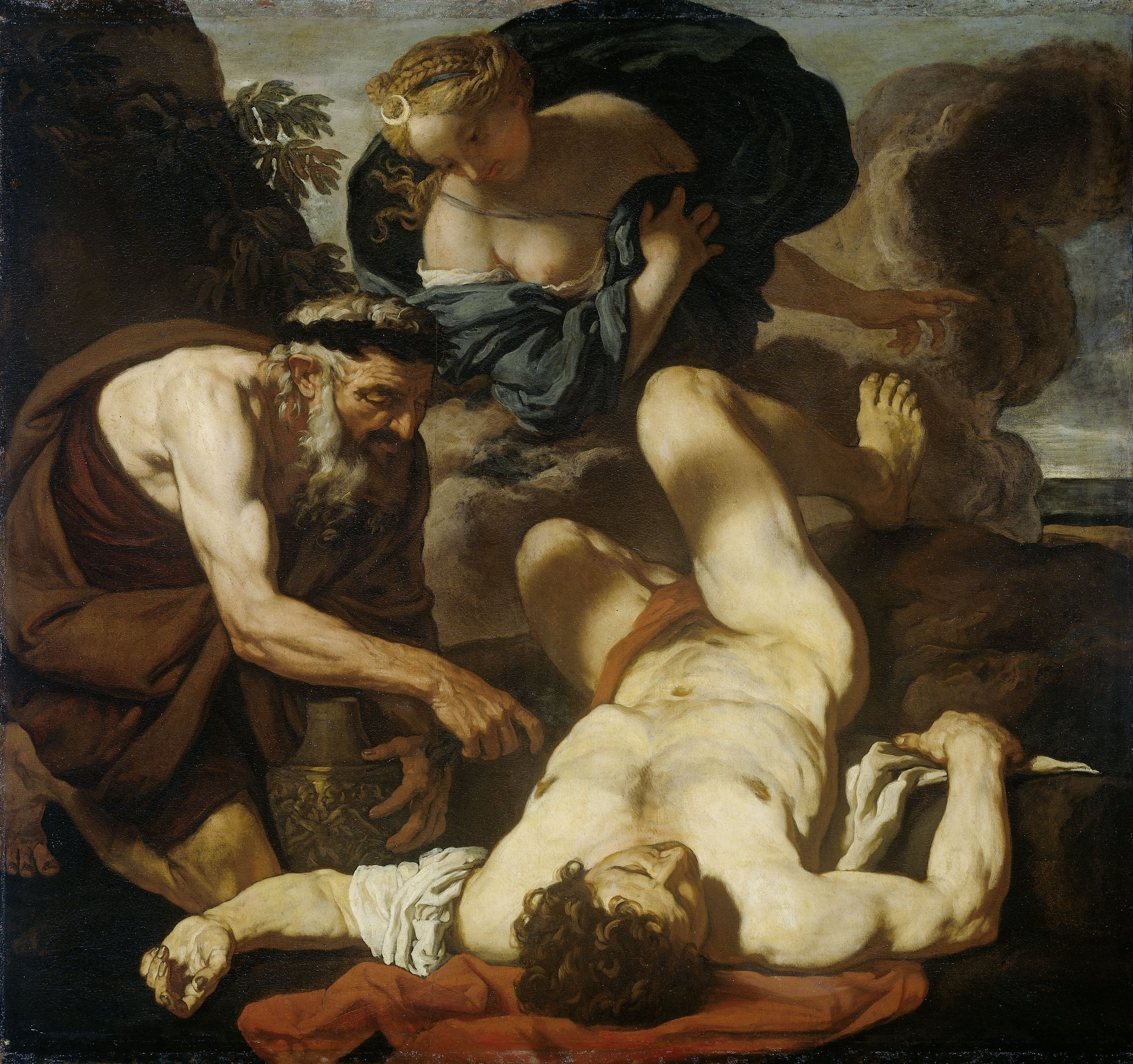
Selene and Endymion

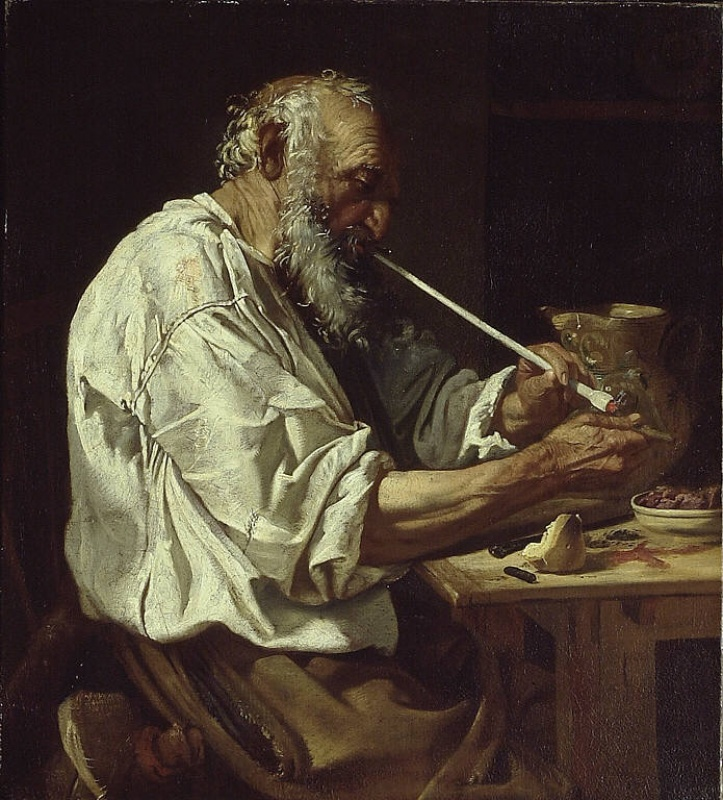
Old Peasant Lighting a Pipe
