= Blasius Hanf =

Austro-Hungarian pastor and ornithologist

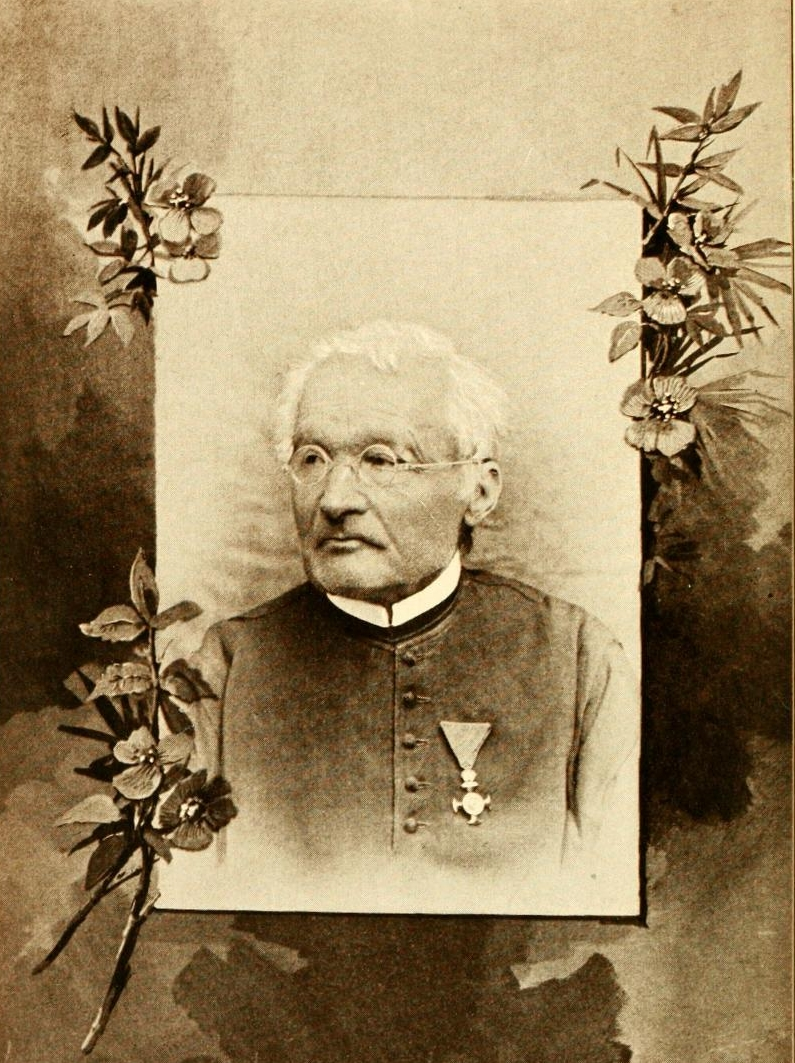
Portrait

Blasius Hanf (30 October 1808 – 2 January 1892) was an Austro-Hungarian pastor and ornithologist. He made observations of migrations in the alpine pass at Mariahof, studied bird behaviour, and collected specimens.

== Life and work ==
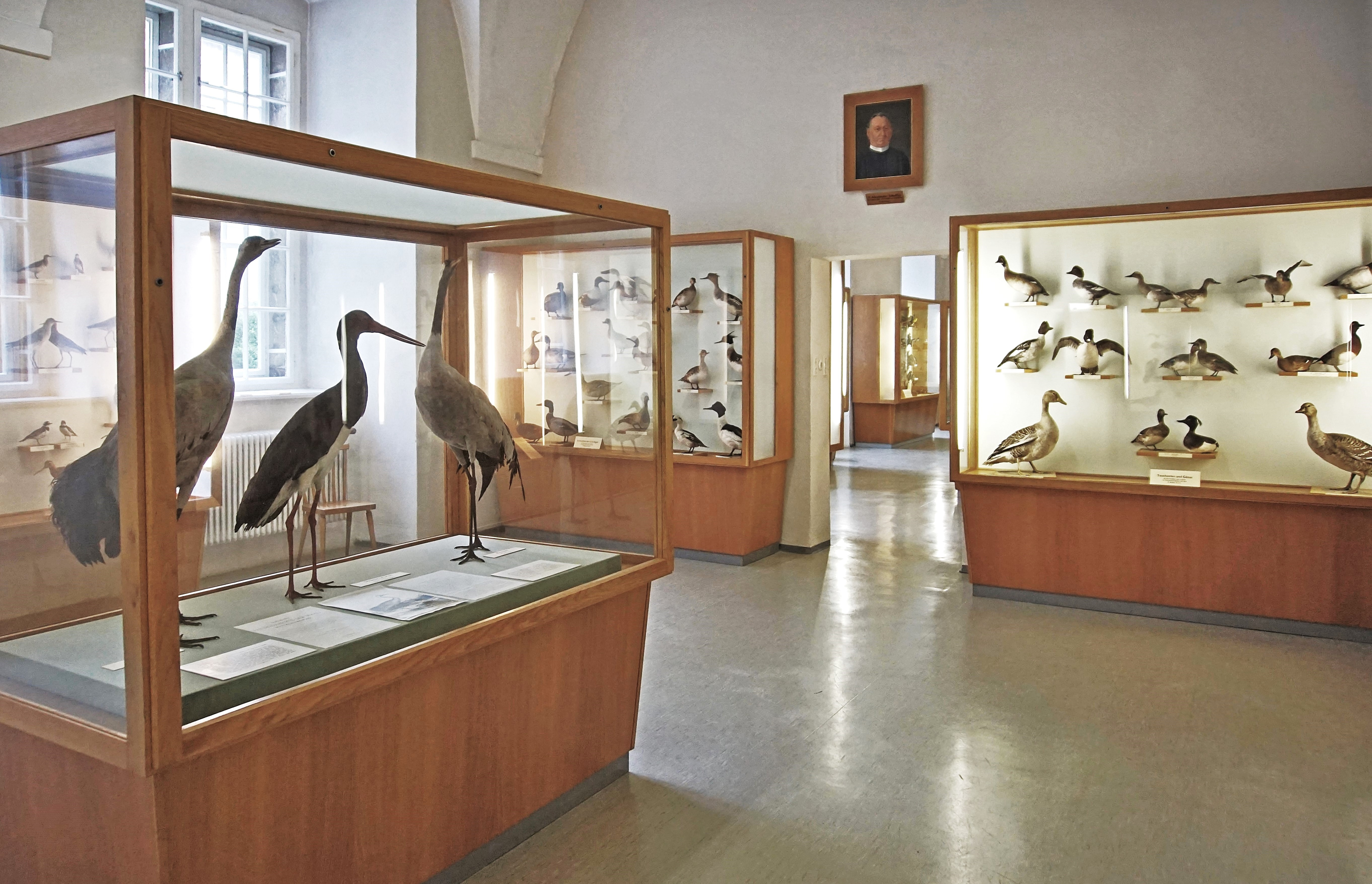
Hanf's collection at St. Lambrecht

Hanf was the fifth child of the pharmacist Karl (d. 1817) in the monastery of St Lambrecht in Upper Styria. He was born Karl Ignaz Hanf. While just nine, his father and at the age of eleven he went to school to Admont Abbey where his mother Elizabeth Zach (d. 1824) took him on a two-day journey by foot. He studied briefly at Judenberg the next year and while at gymnasium his mother died. He then entered the University of Graz to joined the Benedictine Monastery at St. Lambrecht in 1828. He was then given the name Blasius. He was ordained a priest on July 28, 1832, and chaplain at Mariahof the next year. After becoming a curate at Zeitschach in 1843 he returned to Mariahof in 1853 as a pastor, staying on until his death. Mariahof forms a saddle in the eastern Alps and is a route for migratory birds. Hanf's observations on birds in the region was augmented by specimens that he shot and mounted. His taxidermic mounts earned a prize at the Vienna World Exhibition (1873). His collection of 2000 specimens are still in the abbey of St. Lambrecht. He was made an honorary member of several ornithological associations and he received a golden cross of merit from the Austrian emperor. The ornithological society of Austria set up a marble memorial at St. Lambrecht.
