= Schinderling =

Schinderling was a popular name for the pfennigs with a sharply decreased content of fine silver from the time around 1457 to 1460, which were in circulation mostly in the region of Inner Austria.

== History ==
The cause of the decrease in silver content were the probate disputes between Emperor Frederick III and the master of his mint in Graz, Balthasar Eggenberger. As an independent entrepreneur, Balthasar was doing business at his own risk and his profit margin was based on the ratio of the value of the actual silver content of the coins against their value as currency. When the emperor increased the fees for the minting lease or raised taxes to pay debts, merchants had to pass that cost on by increasing prices or, as in the mint master's case, decreasing the actual amount of silver in the coinage thereby lowering the production cost of the coins against their value as currency. According to Austrian chronicler and contemporary of Balthasar's: "The emperor allowed bad coins to be minted; these coins were named Schinderlings. Anyone with lots of old copper kettles could mint better. He allowed such coins to be minted...by a citizen in Graz named Eggenberg, who had the lease on the minting operations in Graz and in St. Veit in Carinthia."

According to another chronicle from the period, Balthasar became quite wealthy and influential through these activities until the emperor was forced to act in the spring of 1460. He issued an arrest warrant for Balthasar, who received word of the order and fled to Venice with what was a vast sum in gold, silver and jewels of about £40000. By July of that year Balthasar and the emperor had come to some sort of arrangement, the details of which have been lost. Through this arrangement Balthasar was to pay the emperor an unknown sum in exchange for renewal of the minting lease under the stipulation that the minted coins could not have less than a specified amount of silver and amnesty to return to his lands in Graz.

This shortage of money for the payment of the mercenaries linked with the disputes between Balthasar and Emperor Frederick III created a financial crisis. The Schinderlingszeit (Schinderling era) was one of the first cases of open inflation in the German linguistic area shortly before the beginning of modern times. As a result of this the emperor also issued a decree in 1460 fixing wages and prices based on the value of better coins to be minted under the new agreement between the emperor and Balthasar.

== See also ==
- Kipper and Wipper Era
- Ephraimiten
- Great Bullion Famine

== Sources ==
- Heinz Fengler und Autoren "transpress Lexikon Numismatik" VEB Verlag für Verkehrswesen, Berlin 1988, ISBN 3-344-00220-1
- Konstantin Moritz A. Langmaier: Erzherzog Albrecht VI. von Österreich (1418–1463). Ein Fürst im Spannungsfeld von Dynastie, Regionen und Reich (= Forschungen zur Kaiser- und Papstgeschichte des Mittelalters. Bd. 38). Böhlau, Köln u. a. 2015, 499–505, 630
- Hans-Werner Sinn, Die wundersame Geldvermehrung, Staatsverschuldung, Negativzinsen, Inflation, 3. Auflage, Freiburg im Breisgau 2021.
