= Hans Adam Weissenkircher =

Austrian painter (1646–1695)

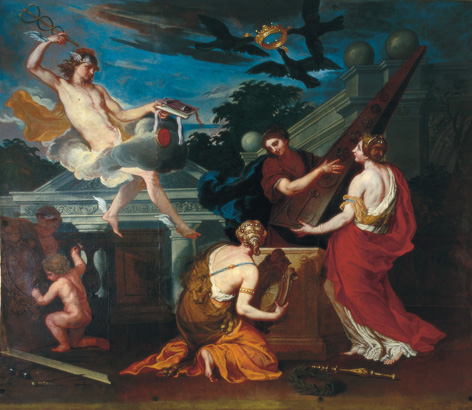
- “Mercury” from the Planetary Room of Schloss Eggenberg in Graz
- Born: Hans Adam Weissenkircher; 10 February 1646; Laufen, Bavaria, Germany
- Died: 16 January 1695 (aged 48); Graz, Styria,
- Education: Johann Carl Loth
- Known for: Painting
- Movement: Baroque
- Patrons: Fürst Johann Seyfried von Eggenberg

Hans Adam Weissenkircher (10 February 1646 – 16 January 1695) was an Austrian Baroque painter and court painter of the Prince Johann Seyfried von Eggenberg in Graz.

== Biography ==
Weissenkircher was born in Laufen an der Salzach, which today lies on the Bavarian side of the Austrian - German border, into the family of a Salzburg artist. Like his fellow Laufen born contemporary, Johann Michael Rottmayr, he trained under the painter Johann Carl Loth who was born in Munich and ran an academy for German-speaking painters in Venice. Weissenkircher adopted much from Michelangelo Caravaggio's painting style. He traveled extensively during his studies, including to the important art and cultural centers of Rome, Florence and Bologna. He finally settled in Styria where he brought the style of the Italian Renaissance north to the court of the Princes of Eggenberg as court painter. He is responsible for numerous, well known works, most importantly the ceiling and wall paintings of the Planetary Room in Schloss Eggenberg which took 8 years from 1678 to 1685 to complete. Additionally, he was responsible for numerous paintings, altar paintings and high altars throughout Styria. He died in Graz, Styria, Austria.

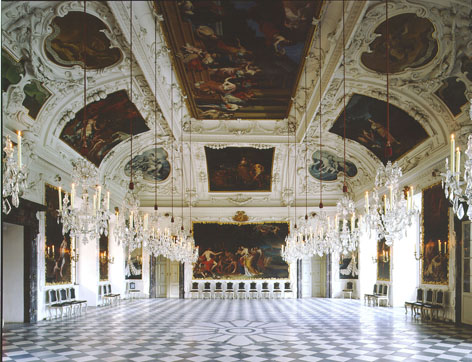
Schloss Eggenberg, The Planetary Room

== Selected works ==
Paintings

- Planetary Room in Schloss Eggenberg (Graz)
- Mary Immaculate in Graz Vierzehn-Nothelfer-Kirche
- St. Paul in Graz in the Joanneum's Alte Galerie in Schloss Eggenberg
- Elijah Raises the Son of the Widow of Zarephath in Graz in the Joanneum's Alte Galerie in Schloss Eggenberg

Altar Paintings

- Mary Magdalene in the Pfarrkirche St. Magdalena (Wildon)
- Holy Trinity in the Graz Karlauerkirche
- The Annuciation in the Graz Grabenkirche
- The Circumcision of Christ in the Kirche St. Andrä (Graz)
- Altar painting in the Kirche Maria im Elend zu Straßgang
- Altar painting in the Mausoleum Ehrenhausen

High Altars

- Pfarrkirche St. Veit (Graz)

== Literature ==
- Hans Adam Weissenkircher: Fürstlich Eggenbergischer Hofmaler. By Barbara Ruck. Graz: Landesmuseum Joanneum, 1985.
- Schloss Eggenberg. By Barbara Kaiser. Graz: Christian Brandstätter Verlag, 2006. ISBN 3-902510-80-3 (English Edition) or ISBN 3-902510-96-X (German Edition)
