= Hals (Passau) =

- Quarter of Passau
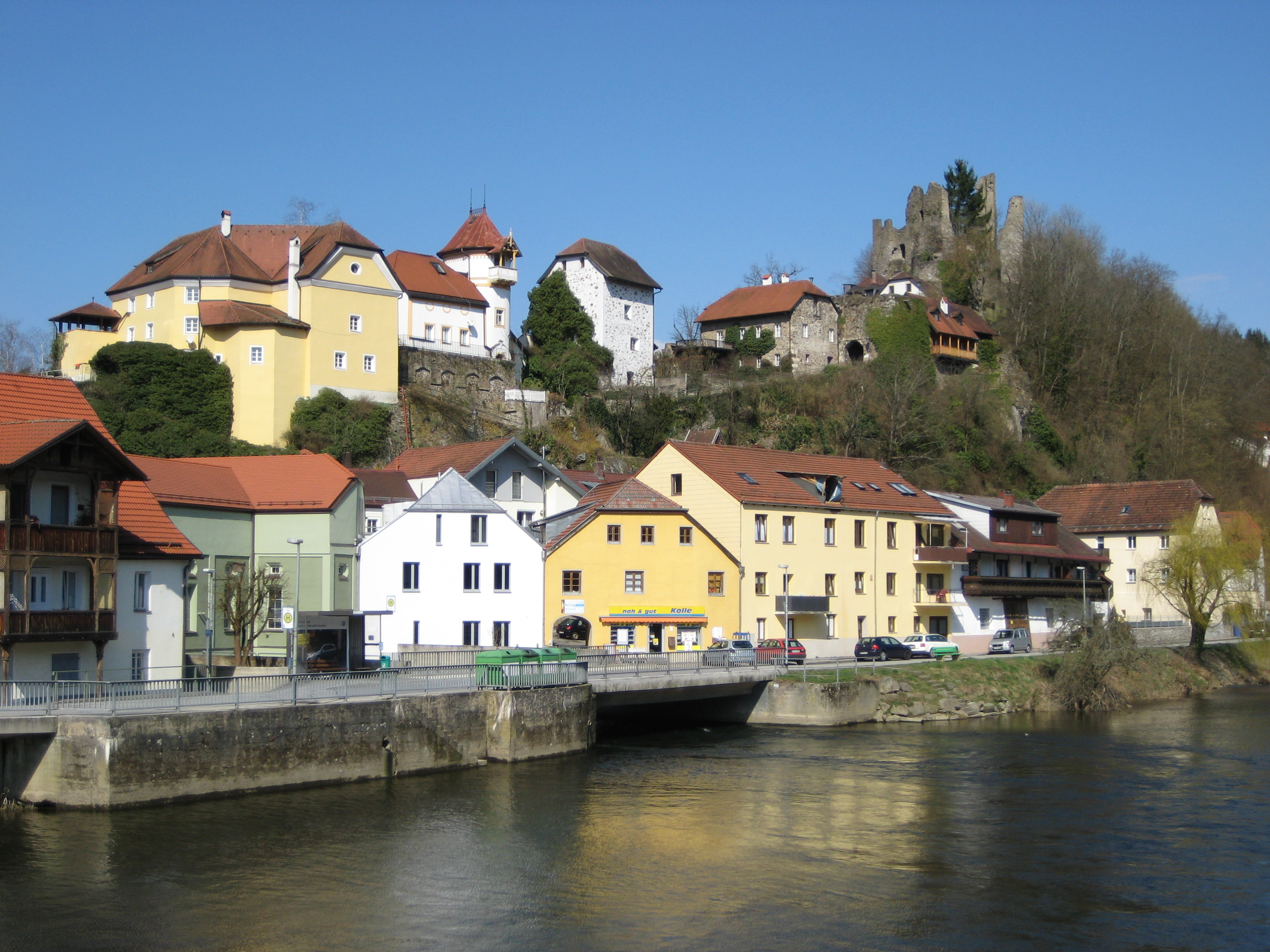
- Image of Hals with the Burgruine (upper right)

- Coat of arms

- Location of Hals within Passau
- Interactive map of Hals
- Location within Germany Location within Bavaria
- Coordinates: 48°35′20.0004″N 13°27′50.0004″E
- Country: Germany
- State: Bavaria
- Town: Passau
- Elevation: 150 m (490 ft)
- Time zone: UTC+01:00 (CET)
  - Summer (DST): UTC+02:00 (CEST)

Hals is a quarter in the northern part of Passau, whose geography is strongly influenced by the river Ilz.

== History ==
There is a medieval settlement at the current site of the Burgruine Hals at the narrowest point of the Halser Ilzschleifen. The town was the seat of the Lord of Hals, which was his earldom in 1280. In 1376 the Holy Roman Emperor Charles IV granted the a charter to the town and also provided it with coining rights (Münzrecht) until 1497.

In the background of the later decline of the earldom, municipal rights began to be exercised more strongly. In 1517 the earldom passed to Bavaria and the town was the sea of a Pfleger (caregiver). In 1587 Duke William V reinstated the town's status as a market. Due to its cramped conditions the market town could not expand, on the other hand, the Bishops of Passau never succeeded in integrated the town into the prince bishop's territories.

=== 19th Century ===
In 1803 the area was part of the royal district court of Passau. 1810 the town was devastated, as it was many times before, by a fire. Most of the remaining houses in the town, including the parish, were built shortly after the fire. In 1825, Hals received the status of a III Class town.

Since the Middle Ages timber rafting was an important economic factor for Hals. The powerful levees (Tiftsperre) were developed and the existing 115 m long tunnel was construction from 1827 to 1831. In Hals, the storage yards were expanded and the timer industry began to grow, with the corporation Salomon Forcheimer employing hundreds of seasoner workers. However, this site had to be abandoned in 1926 due to a missing rail link.

In 1890, the Passauer photographer Ducrue built a Bavaria-Bad cure and hydrotherapy spa in Siegelberg. Hals was then temporarily named "Bad Hals" Under the new owner, Dr. Mayerhaused the bathhouse was further expanded. It utilized every kind of Hydrotherapy as well as Electrotherapy. During World War I, its therapeutic centers were taken apart.

=== Twentieth century ===
In 1902, Hals renounced its town privileges and returned to its previous status as a market. On August 9, 1922, it came under the jurisdiction of the area of Ries.

A Weir has stood in the Ilz at the Halser Reservoir to support a hydroelectric power plant. However, the plant is not located on the foot of the dam but rather lies about 2.5 km downriver. A canal drives the water right through the town to the power station.

On April 30, 1945 the parish, town hall and additional houses were destroyed by artillery fire. Reconstruction then began in 1946. In 1954, new streets were around Christdobl to improve Hals's connections to Passau.

As a result of the Gemeindegebietsreform (territorial reform), which came into effect on July 1, 1972, the former market of Hals became a neighborhood of Passau, although there would be a plebiscite, only 13 of the 113 electors supported incorporation into Passau, while the larger share supported a merger with Grubweg. The current neighborhood has a population of 1,695 residents (12/31/2005)

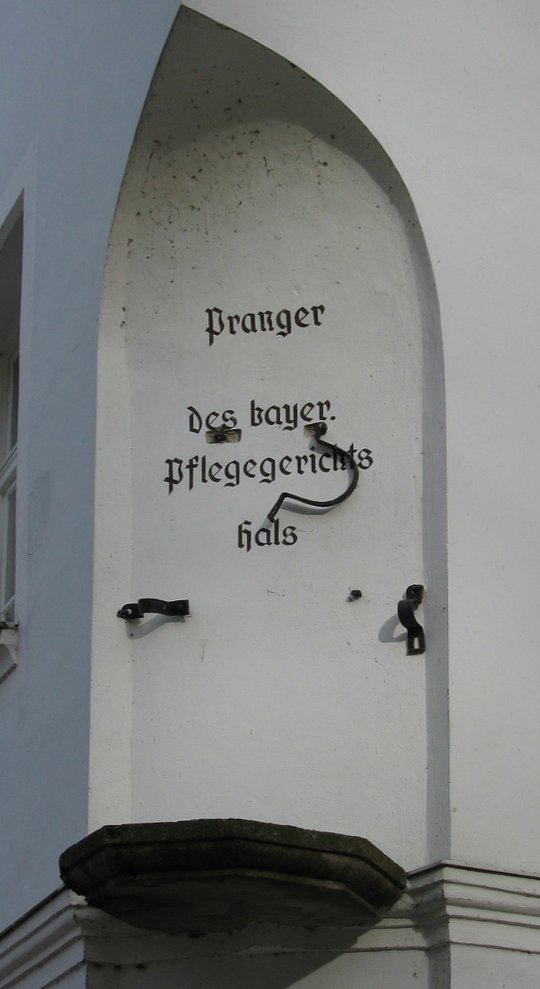
Pranger at the Halser Marketplace

== Sights ==
- Above the village there is a hill which is home to the Burgruine Hals
- The Vorwerk of the Halser Burg, the Burg Reschenstein
- The Pranger before the town hall has been maintained since 1510
- The Late Gothic sanctuary of St. Achatius is now a cemetery chapel
- After its destruction in the war, The Parish of St. Georg from the 19th century was restored between 1950 and 1951

== Mayors ==
- Kumpfmüller (1879–1906)
- Alois Greiner (1906–1912)
- Michael Zitzelsberger (1912–1922)
- Josef Niedermayer (1922–1923)
- Friedrich Haushofer (1923–1931)
- Georg Schilleder (1931–1932)
- Ferdinand Rothofer (1932–1933)
- Max Weidinger (1933–1936)
- Josef Lindinger (1936–1945)
- Joseph Feßler (1945)
- Ludwig Breinbauer (1945–1954)
- Josef Schwarz (1954–1955)
- Fritz Gerstl (1955–1964)
- Georg Sterzer (1964–1972)

== Notable residents ==
- Friedrich Pustet (1798–1882), German Publisher und founder of Pustet
