= Hans von Judenburg =

Austrian artist

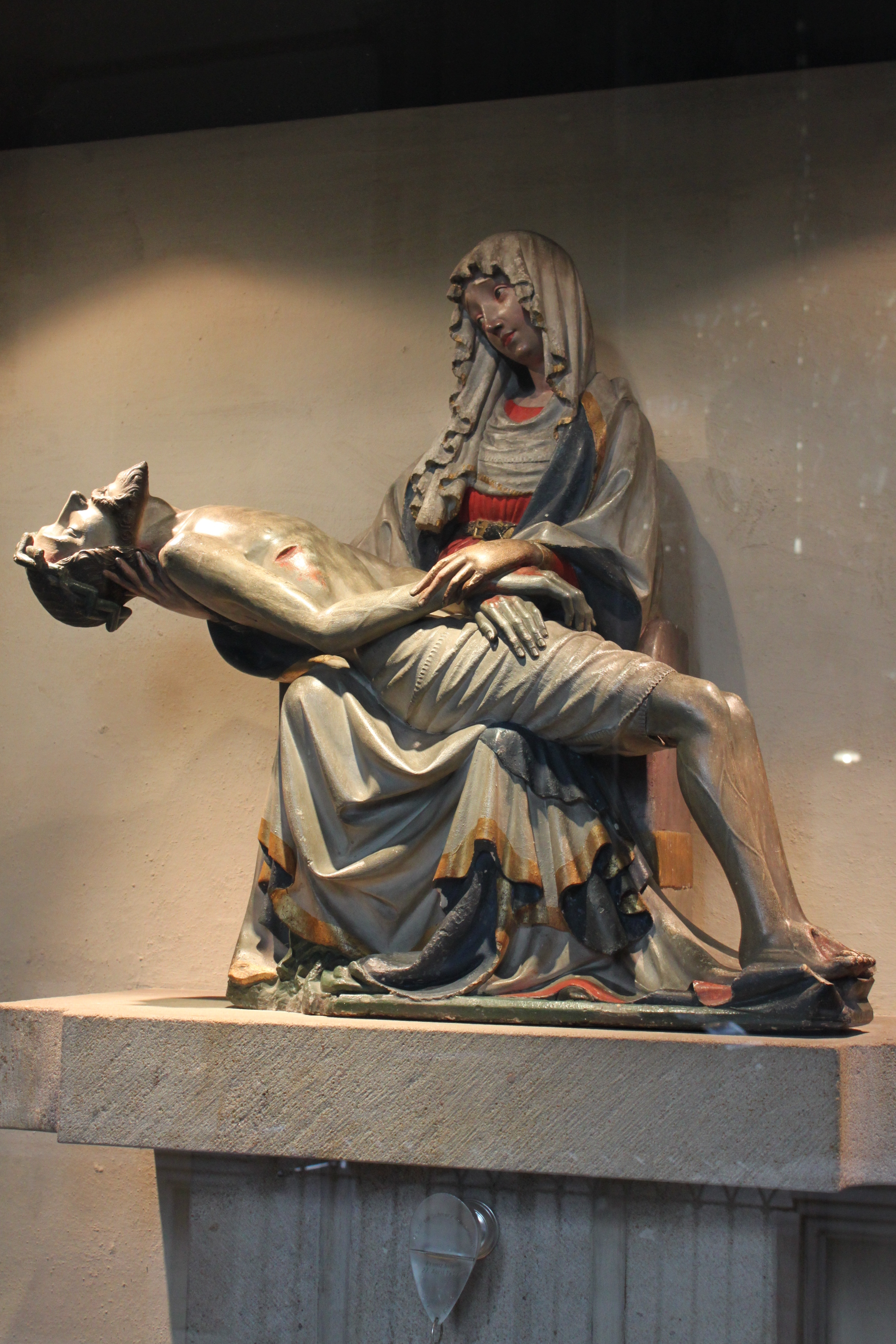
Pietà by Hans von Judenburg, parish church of Bolzano

Hans von Judenburg was an Austrian painter and sculptor active between 1411 and 1424. Very little is known of his life; in 1411, and again in 1424, he was listed as a householder in Judenburg. He ran an artists' studio there as well; it was devoted primarily to the creation of altarpieces. He is known to have created a retable for the high altar of the parish church of Bolzano (then Bozen), contracted in 1421 and finished three years later. Most of its fragments, now dispersed, survive. The center panel depicted the Coronation of the Virgin, along with John the Baptist and Vigilius of Trent. Various scenes from the Life of the Virgin were shown on the wings; these are now scattered around various locations, including the parish church of Deutschnofen. The hand of at least two different carvers can be seen in the work.

Michael Pacher, for his altarpiece in Gries-San Quirino, is known to have taken Hans's work as model, as he was contractually obligated so to do.
