= Universalmuseum Joanneum =

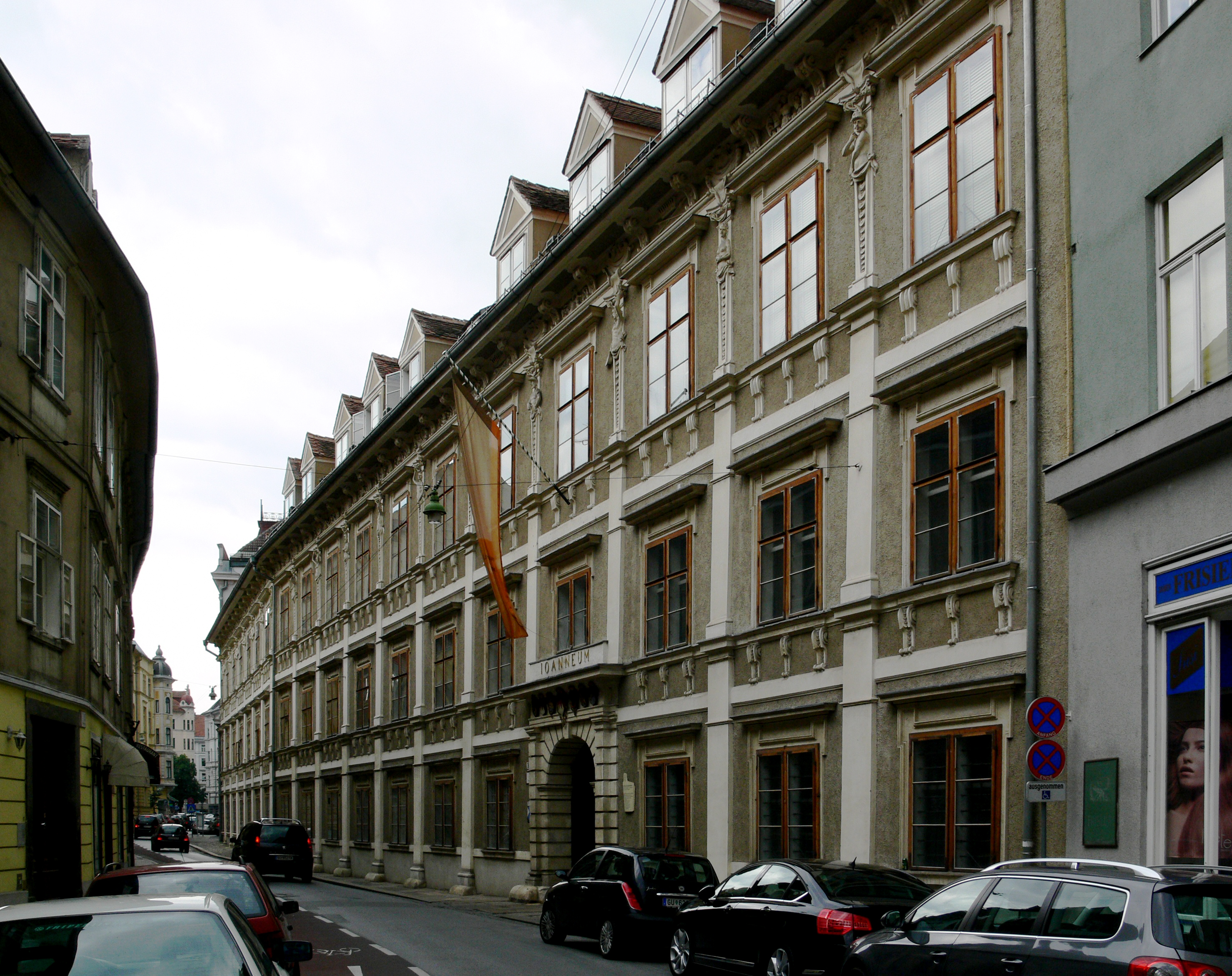
- Original Joanneum building in Raubergasse, Graz
- Established: 26 November 1811
- Location: Graz, Stainz, Trautenfels and Wagna (Flavia Solva) in the Austrian province of Styria
- Coordinates: 47°4′7″N 15°26′15″E
- Type: Universal museum
- Collection size: Over 4.5 million objects covering culture & fine art, nature, science & technology
- Visitors: 494,487 (2008); 513,826 (2009); 486,762 (2010); 501,907 (2011)
- Director: Wolfgang Muchitsch
- Website: museum-joanneum.at/en/

The Universalmuseum Joanneum (Austrian German: [univɛrˌsaːlmuˈseːʊm joaˈneːʊm]) is a multidisciplinary museum with buildings in several locations in the state of Styria, Austria. It has galleries and collections in many subject areas including archaeology, geology, paleontology, mineralogy, botany, zoology, history, art and folk culture. It is the oldest museum in Austria as well as the largest universal museum in central Europe with over 4.5 million objects in 13 departments and 12 locations in the Styrian cities of Graz, Stainz, Trautenfels, and Wagna (Flavia Solva). To reflect this status and its growth over the last two centuries, as well as to present a more recognizable image internationally, the Landesmuseum Joanneum was officially renamed Universalmuseum Joanneum in 2009.

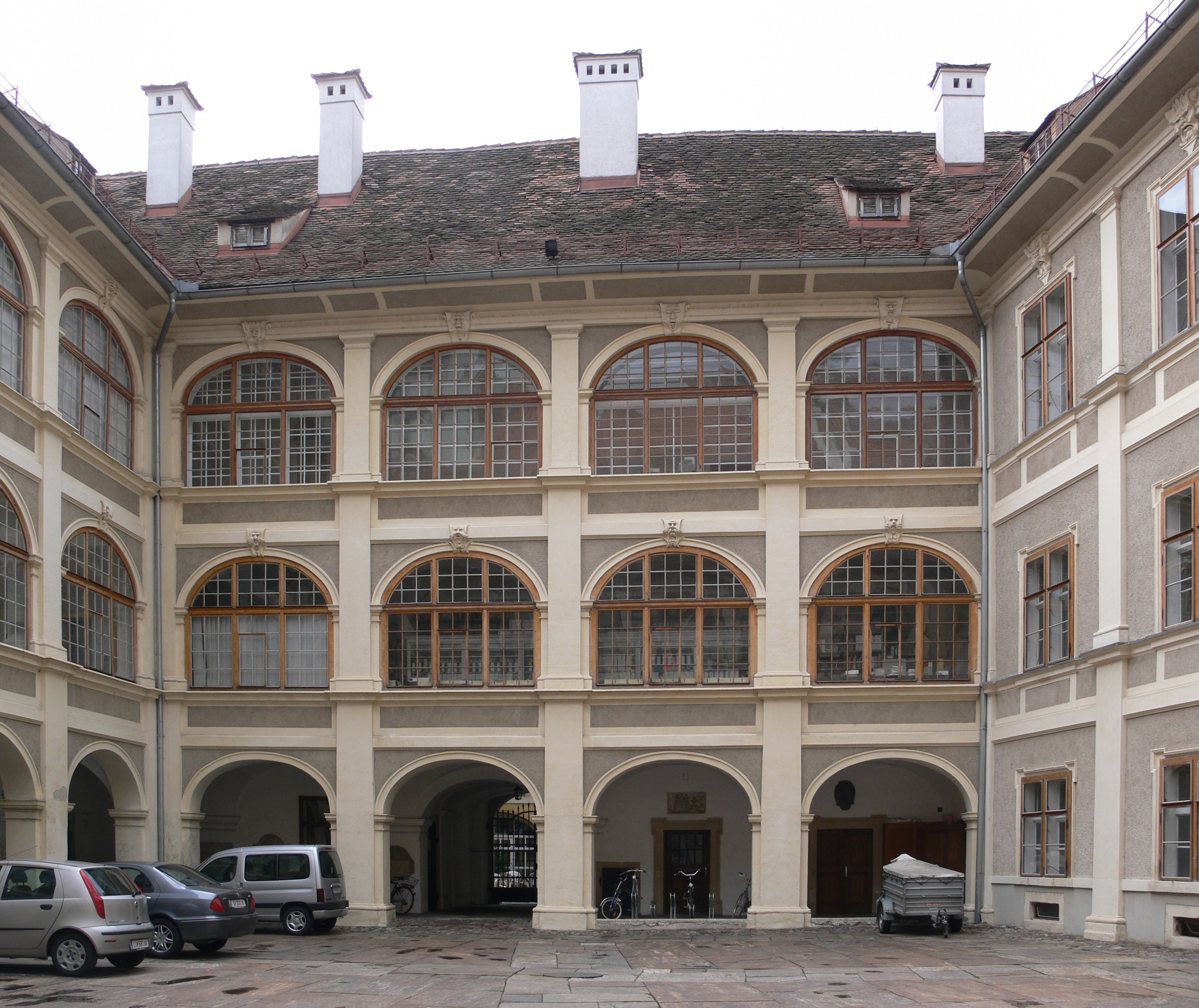
Inner courtyard of the Lesliehof

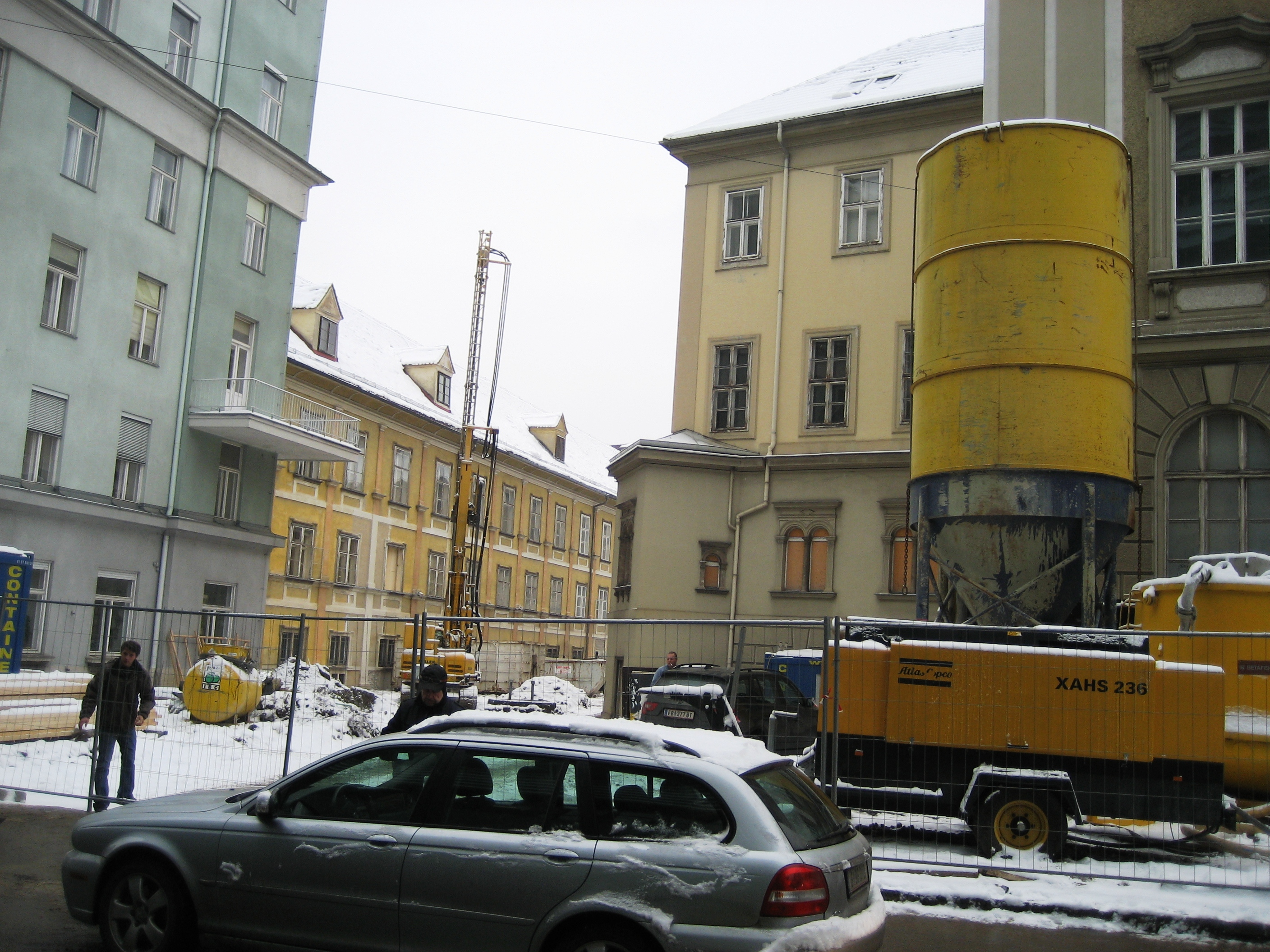
Joanneum Quarter under construction – Neutorgasse building (right) and the rear of the Lesliehof (center-left)

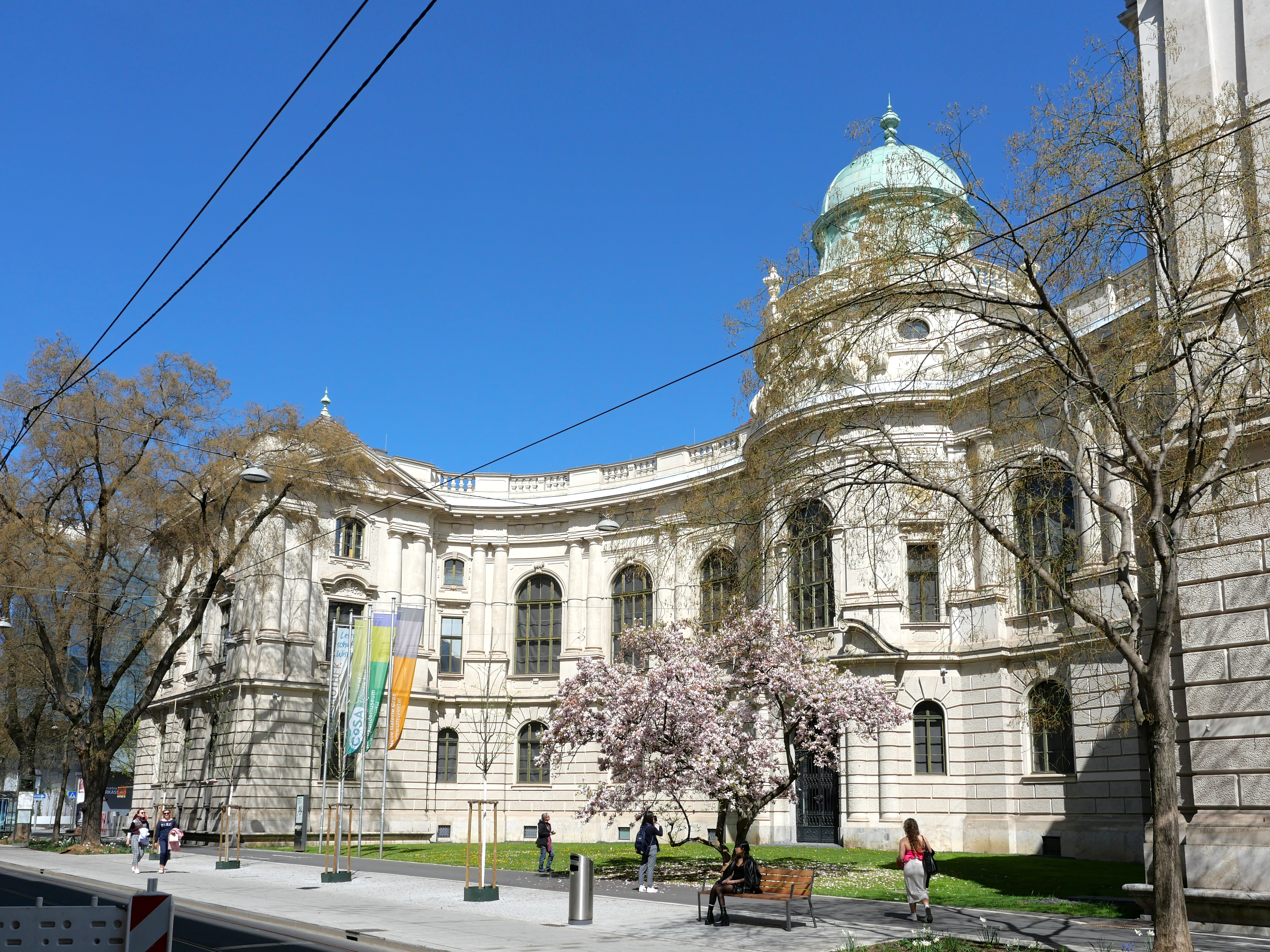
The new Joanneum at the Neutorgasse

== History ==
The Landesmuseum Joanneum was established in 1811 by Archduke Johann. It was Austria's first museum as well as a center for continuing education and scientific research. Notably, the Coin Cabinet and the mineralogical collection were extensive, private collections belonging to the archduke. They form the heart of the museum's departments in disciplines from both the humanities and the natural sciences. Around this core of collections, some of the best scientists of the era taught and conducted research: Friedrich Mohs developed the Mohs scale of mineral hardness there and Franz Unger, a pioneer in paleobotany, plant physiology, phytotomy and soil science, taught here. In 1864, the Joanneum entered the ranks of the "k.k. technical colleges".

Following the decision to raise the institution into the ranks of imperial colleges, as well as for organizational reasons and the need for more space, the institution was split in 1887. The college became the Graz University of Technology, and the collections of the Joanneum, both scientific and cultural-historical, were combined into the Landesmuseum Joanneum.

The Joanneum show collections occurred in the "Lesliehof" along the Raubergasse in Graz just off the main square. However, the collections soon outgrew the confines of the residence. A new museum building was erected between 1890 and 1895, along the Neutorgasse in Graz directly behind the Lesliehof. This building, designed in the neobaroque style by August Gunold, became the "New Joanneum".

=== The Joanneum during the Nazi era ===
After Nazi Germany's annexation of Austria, Jews were persecuted and their property seized, including the artworks that belonged to Jewish art collectors. Many of these artworks, often seized via the Vugesta Nazi looting organisation, ended up in the possession of museums, including the Universalmuseum Joanneum. In April 1998, the Joanneum was one of the first museums in Austria to set up a working group on "Acquisitions and provisions from Jewish property 1938–1955". According to the official report published by the museum in 2010, in the post-war period, looted cultural assets still remained in the possession of the museum despite restitution laws. Provenance research began and some artworks were returned to the heirs of the Jewish collectors who had been looted.

=== 21st century ===
Beginning in 2009, both buildings, as well as the open ground between them, underwent extensive renovation and construction. A new, central, underground entrance and three-story, underground depot adjoining both buildings and the Styrian Provincial Library was built. During the Joanneum's bicentennial in 2011, the New Gallery art museum and the multimedia collection opened in the renovated Neutorgasse building. The Museum of Nature and Science was redesigned in its original, albeit renovated, location in the Lesliehof.

Until 2003, the Joanneum was governed by the Styrian regional government. In 2003, coinciding with the designation of Graz as the European Capital of Culture, the Joanneum was spun off into a limited liability company (Gesellschaft mit beschränkter Haftung). While the Joanneum gained some autonomy in business, marketing and budgetary decision-making with this move, the Province of Styria remains the successor of Archduke Johann and retains all ownership and property rights to the buildings and collections.

The museum is the largest of its kind in central Europe and second only to the Kunsthistorisches Museum in Vienna in size for Austrian museums in general. The Joanneum employs an international team of about 500 people across fields from visitor services to acquisitions, conservation and preservation to scientific research. The more than 4.5 million objects among the various collections as well as historical buildings and locations form the basis of a multifaceted exhibition program. Steeped in tradition, the Joanneum collects, preserves, conserves, researches and conveys a broad spectrum of information dealing with the nature, history, culture and art of Styria in an international context with an eye towards the future.

== Locations and collections ==
=== Graz ===
==== Styrian Armory ====
The Landeszeughaus originally was the central weapons depot of the Duchy of Styria during the Ottoman Wars. It is the only remaining armory of its type in the world. The installation remained largely unchanged for nearly 400 years and provides the atmosphere of an authentic armory of the 17th century. 32,000 exhibits are housed in the collection; suits of armor, coats of mail, helmets, melee weapons, firearms and other engines of war. The military history of Styria is illustrated with its own exhibition in the cannon hall.

==== Folkloric Museum ====
The Folkloric Museum (Volkskundemuseum) houses the oldest and most extensive collection of folkloric and folk culture objects in Styria. It was opened in 1913, and is located in a former Capuchin monastery just inside Graz's only remaining Renaissance city-gate, the Paulustor (St. Paul's Gate), erected under Ferdinand II. The library of folklore contains over 14,000 individual volumes as well as an archive of original material and over 20,000 slides and historic photographs documenting the life of rural Styria. The exhibits offer insights into the rural culture and lifestyle of pre-industrial Styria. The collection emphasizes the life, fashion and beliefs of the Styrian people, showing the social and cultural relations between the person and the objects left behind. Specific features of the collection are the original smoking room and the Traditional Garments Hall (Trachtensaal). The complex also includes the Antoniuskirche (St. Anthony's Church) with original paintings by Giovanni Pietro de Pomis and Hans Adam Weissenkircher, where traditional "Styrian Shepherds' and Crib Songs" are performed before Christmas along with new compositions by local composers.

==== History Museum ====
The Styrian Treasury holds the cultural history collection of the Joanneum and encompasses around 35,000 objects from all areas of the aesthetically informed way of life – from the Middle Ages up to the present-day: They bear witness to Styrian history and offer examples of life among Styrian royalty and nobility as well as the domestic life of the aristocracy and middle-class; artisans' crafts in metal, wood, ivory, ceramic, glass and textiles as well as collections of wrought iron objects, traditional garments and musical instruments are presented. The Styrian ducal hat, the magnificent coach of Emperor Frederick III and a stone coat of arms from the Graz Castle count among the most significant objects in the collection. To coincide with the Joanneum's bicentennial year, the cultural history collection opened the History Museum in summer 2011 in the former Herberstein city palace in Sackstrasse and presents a newly designed permanent exhibition expanded by special exhibitions.

The History Museum is housed in the former Herberstein Palace and, in addition to the collection and temporary exhibitions, also opens the Baroque staterooms to visitors. The Herberstein Palace was originally renovated into a Baroque city palace for the Princes of Eggenberg by Austrian architect Joseph Hueber. The palace passed into the possession of a branch of the Herberstein family in 1774 after the extinction of the male line of Eggenberg heirs.

==== Joanneum Quarter ====
The Joanneum Quarter (German: Joanneumsviertel) includes the original Joanneum building on the Raubergasse as well as the Neutorgasse building and the Styrian Provincial Library. A grand entrance provides access to all three buildings. Between the three buildings there is a three-story deep, subterranean depot for the library's collections.

===== New Gallery =====
The New Gallery (Neue Galerie) originated in 1941 with the division of the Provincial Art Gallery, founded in 1811 as part of the Joanneum, into the Old Gallery (Alte Galerie) – comprising Medieval to Baroque artworks up to 1800 – and the New Gallery (Neue Galerie) – comprising works beginning with Neoclassicism, Romanticism, Realism and Modern art. The museum has an extensive collection of pedagogic art from the 19th and 20th centuries featuring works by Austrian artists including Ferdinand Georg Waldmüller, Egon Schiele, Gustav Klimt, Maria Lassnig and Arnulf Rainer as well as international artists such as Marcel Duchamp, Robert Rauschenberg and Fred Sandback. The gallery focuses on procuring and exhibiting an ever-growing collection of contemporary art.

The New Gallery houses an extensive collection of some 40,000 graphics as well as photographs, film and video collections. Like the Styrian Arts Hall (Halle für Kunst Steiermark, formerly Künstlerhaus) and the Graz Museum of Contemporary Art (Kunsthaus Graz), the New Gallery provides a venue for contemporary artists, both local and international, with a variety of temporary exhibitions. Among these contemporary artists, controversial Styrian artist Günter Brus was to have his own permanent exhibition space, called the Bruseum, in the newly renovated "Neutorgasse" building in the Joanneum Quarter.

===== Multimedia collections =====
The multimedia collections (formerly known as the Picture and Tone Archives) were established in 1960 to collect photographic, film and audio material relating to Styria for research and educational purposes and to make these materials available to the general public. The collection presently consists of more than 2.5 million photographs, tens of thousands of audio recordings and thousands of films that document the development of the Bundesland of Styria from the dawn of the era of photography, film and audio recording.

===== Museum of nature and science =====
In 2009 the scientific departments of the Joanneum moved to the Center for Natural History in the Andritz district of Graz. This center cares for the collections and continues scientific research with contemporary means. Steeped in tradition, these departments form the core of the original Joanneum established by Archduke Johann. It offers interdisciplinary exhibitions of botany, zoology, geology and paleontology, and mineralogy.

CoSA - Center of Science Activities

The Center of Science Activities (CoSA) is a science center in the natural history museum of the Graz Joanneumsviertel, in which technology and natural sciences are taught in a low-threshold way. It was opened in 2019 after a four-year planning phase as a joint project of the Graz Children's Museum FRida & freD and the Universalmuseum Joanneum.

====== Botany ======
Ferns, flowering plants, mushrooms and mosses–dried, pressed, stretched and packed in paper capsules. The core of the botanical collection consists of more than half a million well-preserved plants. Special collections of fruits and seeds as well as models of fruits and an extensive xylotheque (library of woods) complement the herbarium, which shows a comprehensive archive of Styrian flora and the base for research projects on local vegetation. Franz Unger did some of his early teaching and research in this department while he resided in Graz.

====== Zoology ======
The collection encompasses about 850,000 specimens typical of their respective habitats. Vertebrates take up the largest portion of the collection. Examples from other regions—from the seashores to the original fauna of Australia—round-out the collection inventory. The primary focuses of the scientific collections are, among other things, insects and mollusks among the invertebrate animals as well as skeletons and bird's eggs among the vertebrates.

====== Geology and paleontology ======
500 million years Styrian history are gathered here: Fossilized remains of earlier living beings reveal information about ice ages, tropical seas, ancient forests and marshes. Beside the mammoths and mastodons, the cave bears and the giant deer, corals, mussels and fish are found among the core specimens of the collection. Since 1998 the department of Geology and Paleontology has organized fossil digs with schools.

====== Mineralogy ======
As with the coin cabinet collection, the mineralogical collection traces its origin to the private collection of Archduke Johann, which encompassed several thousand pieces at that time. Today the inventory has grown to about 80,000 specimens. The collection presents minerals from across the world as well as a Styrian regional collection. The mineralogy department of the Joanneum was where Friedrich Mohs developed the Mohs scale of mineral hardness which remains authoritative. He was the first curator of the Joanneum.

==== Eggenberg Palace ====
===== Staterooms and gardens =====
Eggenberg Palace (Schloss Eggenberg) was added to the registry of the Graz historic city centre as a UNESCO World Heritage Site in 2010. Eggenberg Palace is the most significant palace ensemble in Styria and is surrounded by an extensive, scenic garden. The palace, designed by court architect Giovanni Pietro de Pomis, according to the inspiration of the Spanish El Escorial, is both an opulent residence intended to convey the wealth, might and status of owner-builder Hans Ulrich von Eggenberg as well as a complex allegory of the cosmos. Central to the multifaceted conception are an ensemble of historic interior rooms. The cycle of 24 staterooms with original accouterments and period furnishings from the 17th and 18th centuries counts among the most significant ensembles of historic interiors in Austria. The climax of this piano nobile is the Planetary Room, which owes its name to the cycle of ceiling and wall paintings (completed in 1685) that adorn it, by court painter Hans Adam Weissenkircher. His elegant melding of astrological and hermetic images, numerology and family mythology into a complicated allegory of the "Golden Age" of the House of Eggenberg is counted among the most important and impressive systems of early Baroque room-art in Central Europe.

Nine hectares of gardens, mostly overgrown and lost through decades of neglect by the end of World War II, were restored or reconstructed as a living monument to Romanticism and bear the influence of the last gardener to own the palace, Jérôme Count Herberstein. In the early 19th century, Count Herberstein had the palace grounds transformed into a picturesque English garden.

===== Old Gallery (Alte Galerie) =====
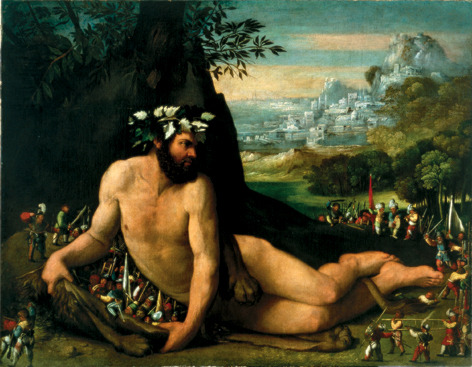
Hercules and the Pygmies by Dosso Dossi, c. 1535

The collections of the Old Gallery contain works by old masters of European art from the Middle Ages through the 18th century. The 22-room show collection in Eggenberg Palace follows a thematic design by subject matter. Objects of Romanesque art, such as the "St. Nicholas Sacristy Door", Gothic art, including the St. Lambrecht Votive Altarpiece, the "Admont Madonna" and the "Death Portrait of Maximilian I" or a portrait of his first wife Mary, Duchess of Burgundy and the Greater and Lesser Miracle Altars of Mariazell are among the collection of medieval art. Beginning with the Renaissance and going through Mannerism to the late Baroque, works by Lucas Cranach the Elder, Dosso Dossi, Sofonisba Anguissola, Bartholomeus Spranger, Pieter Brueghel the Younger, Martin Johann Schmidt and Angelica Kauffman are on display in the early modern period collection. The inventory of the printroom of the Alte Galerie Graz is extensive and contains hand drawings and print graphics from 1500 till the end of the 18th century. Among these are extensive works by Rembrandt, Albrecht Dürer and Giambattista Piranesi.

===== Coin cabinet =====
The Coin Cabinet also traces its origin to the private collection of Archduke Johann. With over 70,000 objects, it is currently the second largest, public coin collection in Austria. Through a combination of state-of-the-art technology and historical items, the coins, currency and equipment related to minting trace the history of regional coin circulation and minting from the prehistoric era to the eurozone. Among the most significant pieces are coins from finds in and around Styria that were in circulation at the time of the Roman Empire. Additionally, Friesacher and Grazer Pfennigs from the Middle Ages and coins and medallions from the Inner Austrian mints in Graz, Klagenfurt and St. Veit an der Glan as well as from other lands of the Austro-Hungarian Empire are on display. The collection traces the history of coin mintage and names from around the world with prehistoric Celtic coins from the region, shells, early forms of paper currency and the euro in addition to international coins of historic significance minted in Africa, the US, and by the Dutch East India Company among others. The permanent collection, with an additional room for temporary exhibitions, is fittingly situated in the oldest portion of palace dating to the late Middle Ages and once belonging to Balthasar Eggenberger, mint master and financier to Emperor Frederick III in the early days of Mercantilism.

===== Archaeology Museum and Lapidarium =====
The Archaeology museum and lapidarium is Located adjacent to the Planetary Garden and Lapidarium at Schloss Eggenberg. It hosts an array of over 1200 objects from past social environments. The second largest archaeological collection of Austria unites evidence of human existence from "Styrian" prehistory with findings from Classical Antiquity, the Ancient Near East and Ancient Egypt. A unique attraction is the Cult Wagon of Strettweg, found among grave goods from the Hallstatt culture.It underwent an extensive restoration. One of the most significant Roman stonemasonry collections of the eastern Alps is in the adjacent Lapidarium: 96 stones, including gravestones, monuments, medallions and round sculptures, three large remnants of mosaic floors as well as a prominent exhibit, the nearly three meter high grave stele of L. Cantius.

Akin to the archaeology museum is the Roman Museum of Flavia Solva near the southern Styrian town of Wagna. (see below)

===== Museumsakademie Joanneum =====
The Museumsakademie Joanneum encourages further education, training and research in museology, museum planning, interpretive planning, exhibit design and museum management..It is headquartered in one of the Eggenberg garden houses and works with an international network of museums and local institutions including the University of Graz and the Graz University of Technology, It provides a platform and resources for discussions with international researchers in museology and museological theory in order to promote the continuing development of both the Joanneum and of museological practices and research around the world.

==== Exhibition houses ====
===== Graz Museum of Contemporary Art (Kunsthaus Graz) =====
The Museum of Contemporary Art presents architecture, design, new media, CGI, film and photography under one roof. The facility was dubbed "Friendly Alien" by its designers Peter Cook and Colin Fournier. It offers spectacular architecture and exhibitions by international, contemporary artists from the late 20th century onwards. A special highlight of this blob architecture building is the "Needle": a glass viewing platform that looks out across the river Mur towards the Graz city centre and the Castle Hill (Schlossberg). The BIX façade on the eastern (Mur) face of the KHG serves as an "urban screen" with 925 programmable fluorescent lamps that display messages and moving patterns of light on the surroundings. The Graz Museum of Contemporary Art doesn't use an English name for itself but uses the name Kunsthaus Graz in all its English communications.

==== Austrian Sculpture Park ====
More than 60 sculptures are embedded in a seven-hectare park with rose mounds, lotus blossom ponds and labyrinths on the southern outskirts of Graz. Since its founding in 2003, the Austrian Sculpture Park offers visitors a scenic overview of—mainly Austrian, but also international—contemporary sculpture and sculptural art as well as the rolling gardens of Swiss landscape architect Dieter Kienast. In 2008 the collection was extended by the donation of the Painting to Hammer a Nail in / Cross Version by artist Yoko Ono.

=== Throughout Styria ===
==== Roman Museum ====
Flavia Solva is the most significant Roman era find in modern-day Styria. It is located near a hill on the edge of the town of Wagna, overlooking the Mur River. The town developed near an existing settlement of Celts centered on the nearby hill, the Frauenberg near Leibnitz. It gained full status as a Roman city by grant of a municipal charter by Vespasian in 70 AD. The settlement expanded and the Celtic populations adopted Roman ways and technology. It offers a viewing platform and showroom built overlooking excavated Roman ruins. This museum offers visitors a glimpse into the everyday life, worship, and death cults of what was once the most cultured town of the Roman province of Noricum.

==== Schloss Trautenfels ====
The Baroque palace of Schloss Trautenfels is situated at the foot of the Grimming on a protruding cliff in the municipality Pürgg-Trautenfels. In the Middle Ages the cliff protrusion held a small damn on the Enns River until the 16th century. In 1664 the area was bought by the Styrian provincial governor, Count Siegmund Friedrich von Trauttmansdorff and subsequently converted and expanded by him into an early Baroque residence that bears his name. The staterooms feature both Renaissance and Baroque frescoes and paintings as well as the Antler Room of the Counts of Lemberg, and the stunning Marble Hall all of which are open to visitors.

===== Regional Landscape and Folkloristic Museum =====
Beginning in the 1950s a concerted effort was made to collect objects relating to the natural and cultural history of the Ennstal region of Upper Styria and the Styrian Salzkammergut. Both the splendor of the landscape and the palace itself are on display. Objects of geological interest as well as the rural domestic life of the region are on display. The exhibition also displays exhibits recollecting the historic transitions and their impact on the people, such as the Reformation and Counter-Reformation. The permanent show collection presents about 1000 exhibits relating to both the land and the people over the course of history in of the Ennstal Valley as well as the Ausseerland from the Middle Ages to the early modern era.

==== Schloss Stainz ====
Schloss Stainz is a former Augustinian Canons Regular monastery purchased by Archduke Johann in 1840 and remains in the estate of his heirs, the Counts of Meran. Various rooms, terraces and arcades are available to rent for private functions. The former monastery houses two collections:

===== Hunting Museum =====
The design of this exhibition treats the hunt as a historical, sociological and philosophical-ethical phenomenon. It offers the visitor a chance to examine the connections of hunting, ecology and nature. The interdisciplinary approach to this exhibition combines Baroque animal trophies, historical tools and weapons, paintings and artwork with state-of-the-art technology and museum design to illustrate the development of the hunt from the Stone Age through Roman times up to the time of nobles and the early days of the middle-class.

===== Agriculture Museum =====
The main focus of the agriculture collection is to show the rural farming, husbandry and forestry techniques prior to the Industrial Revolution as well as related implements and photographic evidence. Original room furnishings from the 17th and 18th centuries provide a view into the different dimensions of rural life in Styria. The open areas hold a smithy, a cabbage pit, herb garden, an orchard and a small field to demonstrate various aspects of this pre-industrial, rural lifestyle.

== Bibliography ==
- Van Uffelen, Chris. Contemporary Museums - Architecture, History, Collections, Braun Publishing, 2010, ISBN 978-3-03768-067-4, pages 132–141.
- Restitutionsbericht Universalmuseum Joanneum, Graz 2010

== Further information ==
- Das Joanneum – Österreichs Universalmuseum (2006) [DVD] By Günther Schilhan (director) and Helmut Gesslbauer (producer), Austria: ORF Steiermark
- Kaiser, Barbara (2006). Schloss Eggenberg. Brandstätter. ISBN 3-902510-80-3 (English Edition) or ISBN 3-902510-96-X (German Edition)
- Becker, Ulrigh; Arlt, Thomas (25 September 2005). Alte Galerie-- masterpieces. Leykam. (English edition) ISBN 3-7011-7533-0
- Biedermann, Gottfried; Diem, Günther (1982). Katalog: Alte Galerie am Landesmuseum Joanneum : mittelalterliche Kunst, Tafelwerke, Schreinaltäre, Skulpturen. Alte Galerie am Landesmuseum Joanneum.
- Ruck, Barbara (1985). Hans Adam Weissenkircher 1646-1695: Fürstlich Eggenbergischer Hofmaler : Sonderausstellung. Schloss Eggenberg.
- Woisetschläger, Kurt (1974). Der Innerösterreichische Hofkünstler Giovanni Pietro de Pomis: 1569 bis 1633. Verlag Styria. ISBN 978-3-222-10847-1.
- Eggenberg – Geschichte und Alltag. By Gerhard M. Dienes and Karl Kurbinzky et al. Graz: Stadtmuseum Graz, 1999. ISBN 3-900764-22-0
- Hudeczek, Erich (2004). Die Römersteinsammlung des Landesmuseums Joanneum: ein Führer durch das Lapidarium. Landesmuseum Joanneum. ISBN 978-3-9500410-3-3.
- Egg, Markus; Kramer, Diether (12 December 2008). Krieger - Feste - Totenopfer: der letzte Hallstattfürst von Kleinklein in der Steiermark. Römisch-Germanisches Zentralmuseum. ISBN 978-3-7954-2142-7.
- Galić, Anđelka (2008). Giovanni Battista Piranesi (1720 - 1778): das virtuelle Museum römischer Altertümer; eine Ausstellung vom Museum für Kunst und Gewerbe (Muzej za Umjetnost i Obrt), Zagreb; [Begleitpublikation zur Ausstellung ... Landesmuseum Joanneum, Alte Galerie Schloß Eggenberg, Graz 11. April bis 15. Juni 2008]. Landesmuseum Joanneum. ISBN 978-3-902095-19-0.
- Biedermann, Gottfried; Gmeiner-Hübel, Gabriele; Rabensteiner, Christine (1996). Bildwerke: Renaissance, Manierismus, Barock; Gemälde und Skulpturen aus der Alten Galerie des Steiermärkischen Landesmuseums Joanneum in Graz; Kurt Woisetschläger zum 70. Geburtstag. Carinthia. ISBN 3-85378-442-9
- Leitner-Ruhe, Karin (2006). Rembrandt (1606-1669): Radierungen; [anlässlich der Ausstellung "Rembrandt. Radierungen", Alte Galerie am Landesmuseum Joanneum, 15. September bis 12. November 2006]. Landesmuseum Joanneum, Alte Galerie. ISBN 978-3-902095-07-7.
