= Giovanni Pietro de Pomis =

Italian painter

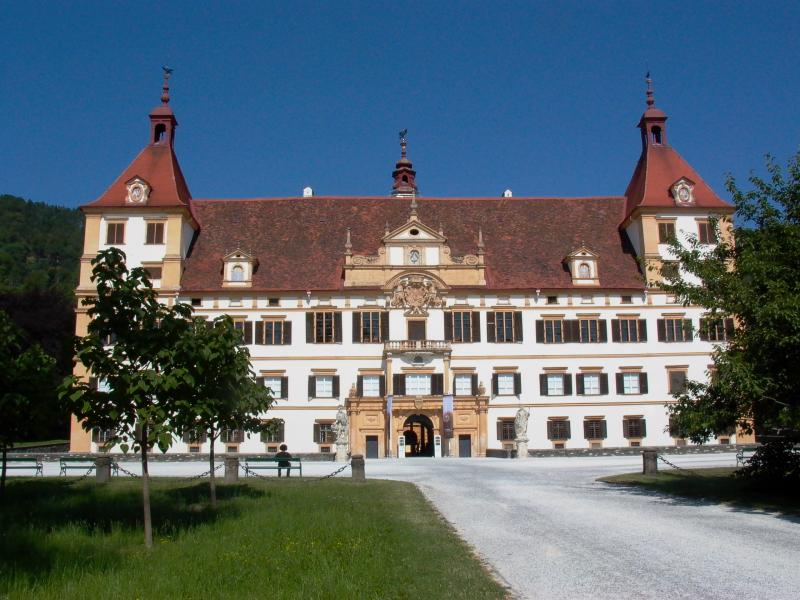
- Schloss Eggenberg front façade with entry portal.
- Born: Lodi, Lombardy, Italy
- Died: 6 March 1633; Graz, Styria, Austria
- Occupation: Architect
- Buildings: Schloss Eggenberg, Mariahilferkirche, Graz, Mausoleum of Ruprecht von Eggenberg to Ehrenhausen, in Ehrenhausen, Katharinenkirche and Mausoleum of Ferdinand II, Holy Roman Emperor in Graz

Giovanni Pietro de Pomis (c.1565 or 1569/70 – 6 March 1633) was an Italian painter, medailleur, architect and fortress master builder. His works show a marked influence of late-Mannerism.

== Biography ==
De Pomis was born in Lodi, Lombardy. He was apparently a pupil of the Venetian Jacopo Tintoretto. From 1588 to 1595, before coming to Graz, de Pomis served as the chamber painter to Ferdinand II, Archduke of Austria in the Tyrol (not to be confused with Ferdinand II, Holy Roman Emperor who was de Pomis's subsequent patron). On 25 October 1595 de Pomis married Judith Anna Dermoyen, the daughter of a Dutch court tapestry master. In that same year his son Johannes Baptist came into the world. He was followed by his sister Elisabeth in 1596. De Pomis and his wife had a total of 13 children; some of whom died at a young age. Both sons Johannes Baptist and Johann Nikolaus died in the Long Turkish War.

In 1595 the Italian artist was appointed as a court artist under Archduke Ferdinand (later Ferdinand II, Holy Roman Emperor) in the Styrian capital of Graz. Traveling with his patron to Rome and Loreto and with Ferdinand's mother, the Archduchess Maria to Spain de Pomis became a close acquaintance of his later principal, Hans Ulrich von Eggenberg. It was likely on this trip to Spain that he made sketches of El Escorial which served as a model for Schloss Eggenberg. In 1600 the artist was granted his own coat of arms. In 1601 he was employed as a military engineer in Ferdinand's retinue in Groß-Kanizsa. Beside his activity as a painter, medailleur and architect he was also a fortress master builder in Görz, Trieste, Gradisca and Fiume.

In 1619, he founded the Confraternity of Painters in Graz and was selected to the board of directors. Ferdinand II bestowed nobility on him on 10 February 1623 in Regensburg. This confirmation of nobility, also afforded an improvement to the coat of arms and lent de Pomis the title von Truiberg. The last years of the court artist's life were marred by a misappropriation of construction funds (1630) and discrepancies with the court chamber. On 6 March 1633 at the age of 63, after long years of illness, Giovanni Pietro de Pomis died in Graz, Styria, Austria, and was buried in his own work, the Graz Mariahilferkirche. He was survived by his widow and four daughters.

Among his most famous works are the Mausoleum of Ruprecht von Eggenberg to Ehrenhausen in Ehrenhausen, Schloss Eggenberg (Graz) which he designed with the help of his principal, Hans Ulrich von Eggenberg, the Mariahilferkirche in Graz, which also holds the Eggenberg family crypt and was later renovated by Joseph Hueber, as well as the Graz Church of St. Catherine of Alexandria and the attached Mausoleum of Ferdinand II, Holy Roman Emperor which was not completed in de Pomis' lifetime but was finished by Johann Bernhard Fischer von Erlach at the behest of Ferdinand's grandson Leopold I, Holy Roman Emperor.

== Selected works ==
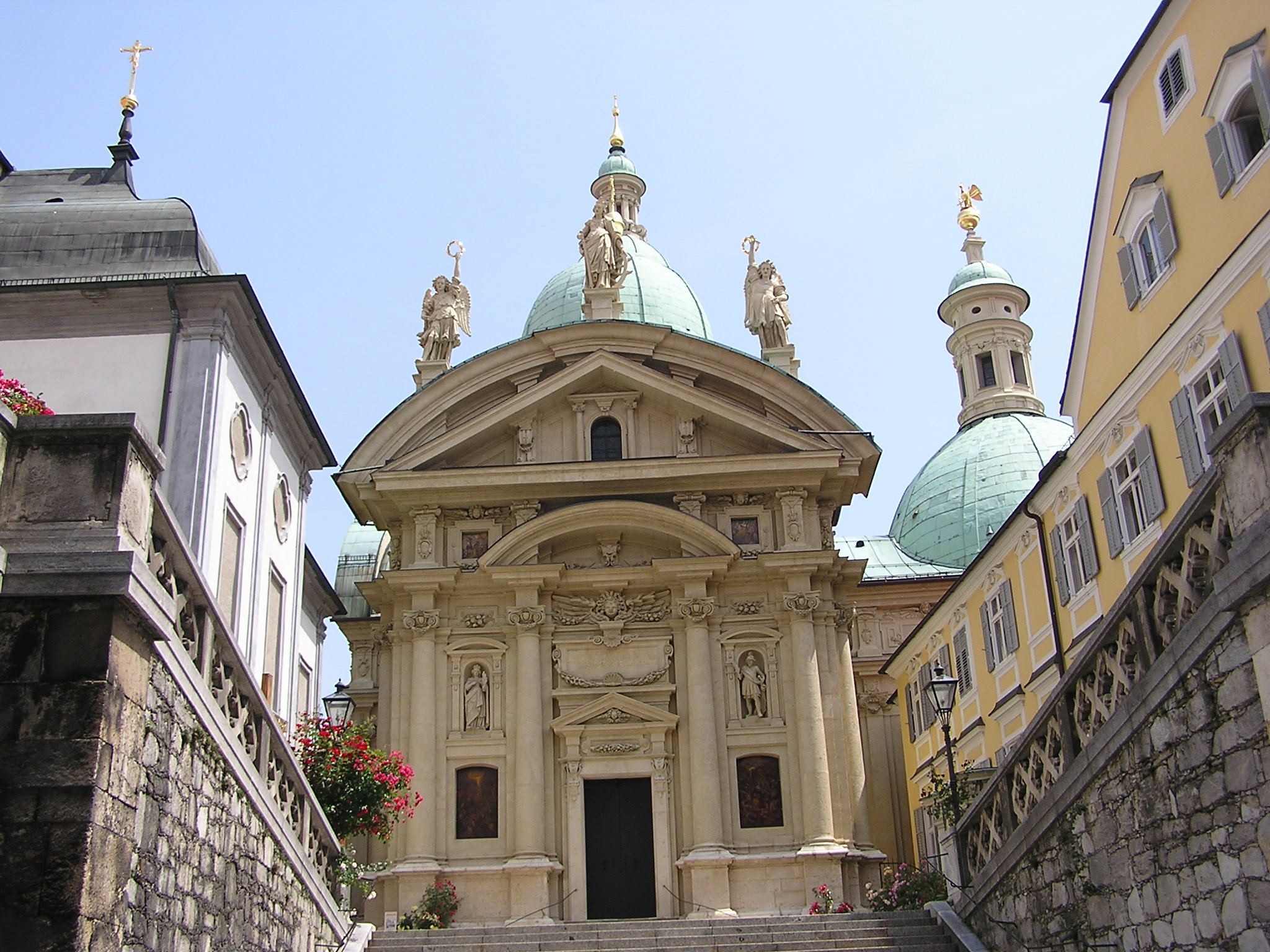
Façade of St. Catherine of Alexandria's Church with dome of attached Mausoleum of Emperor Ferdinand II to the right

Architecture

- Mariahilferkirche (Graz)
- Katharinenkirche und Mausoleum (Graz)
- Schloss Eggenberg (Graz)
- Sacristy in the Graz Cathedral
- Mausoleum of Ruprecht von Eggenberg in Ehrenhausen
- Wallfahrtskirche zum hl. Antonius von Padua in Radmer, Styria
- Castello di San Giusto in Triest

Paintings

- Original painting of the façade of Herzogshofs in Graz
- Altar paintings in the Graz Cathedral
- Altar painting in the Graz Antoniuskirche (Graz)
- Portrait of Hans Ulrich von Eggenberg in the Alte Galerie of the Joanneum in Schloss Eggenberg
- Archduke Ferdinand as Fighter for a Righteous Cause in the Alte Galerie

== Gallery ==
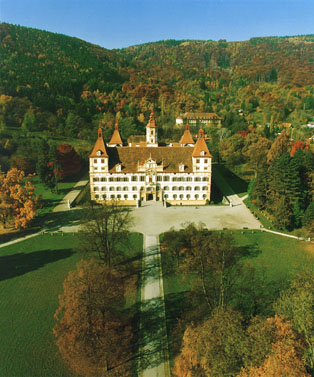
Aerial view of Schloss Eggenberg (Graz)

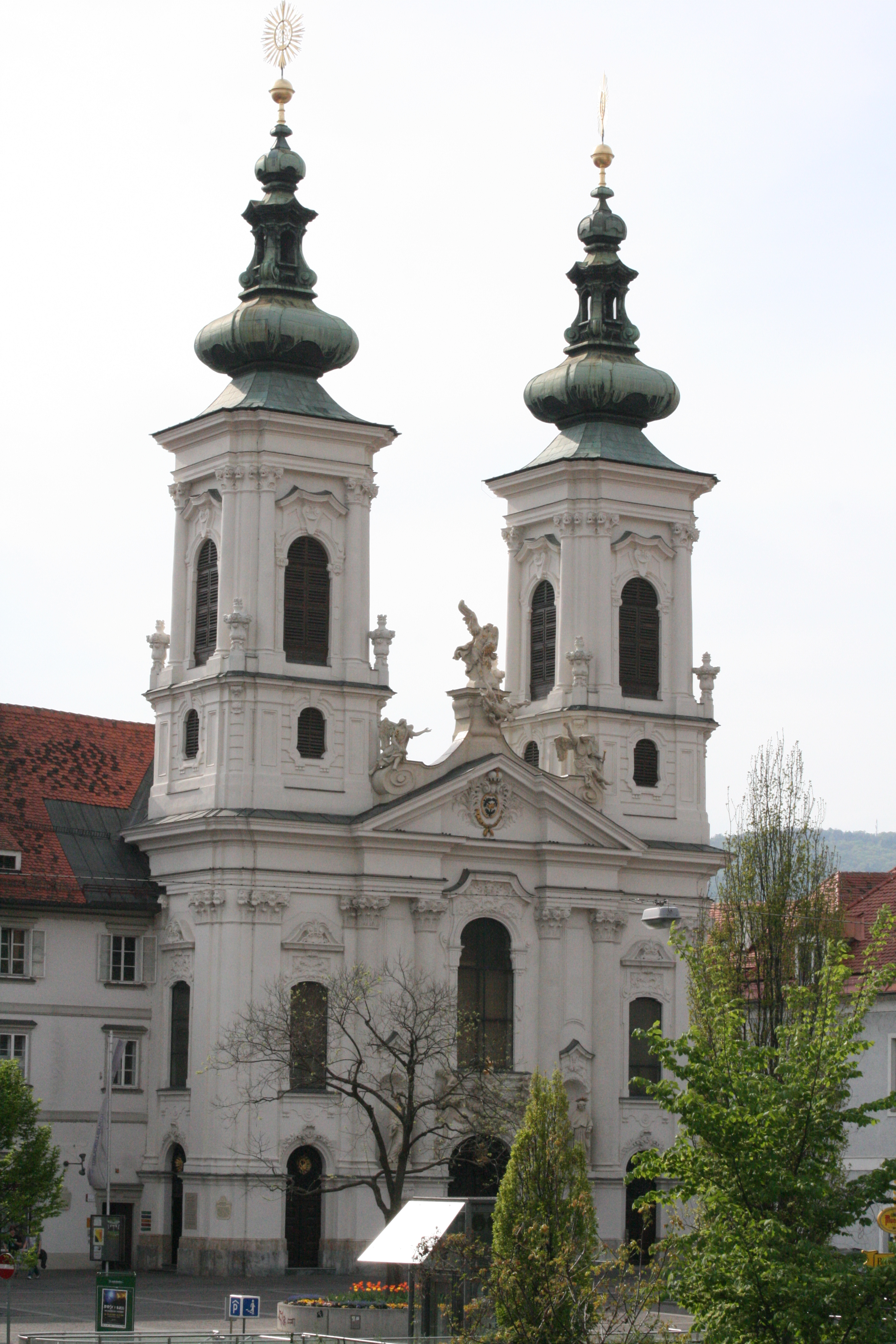
Mariahilferkirche Graz

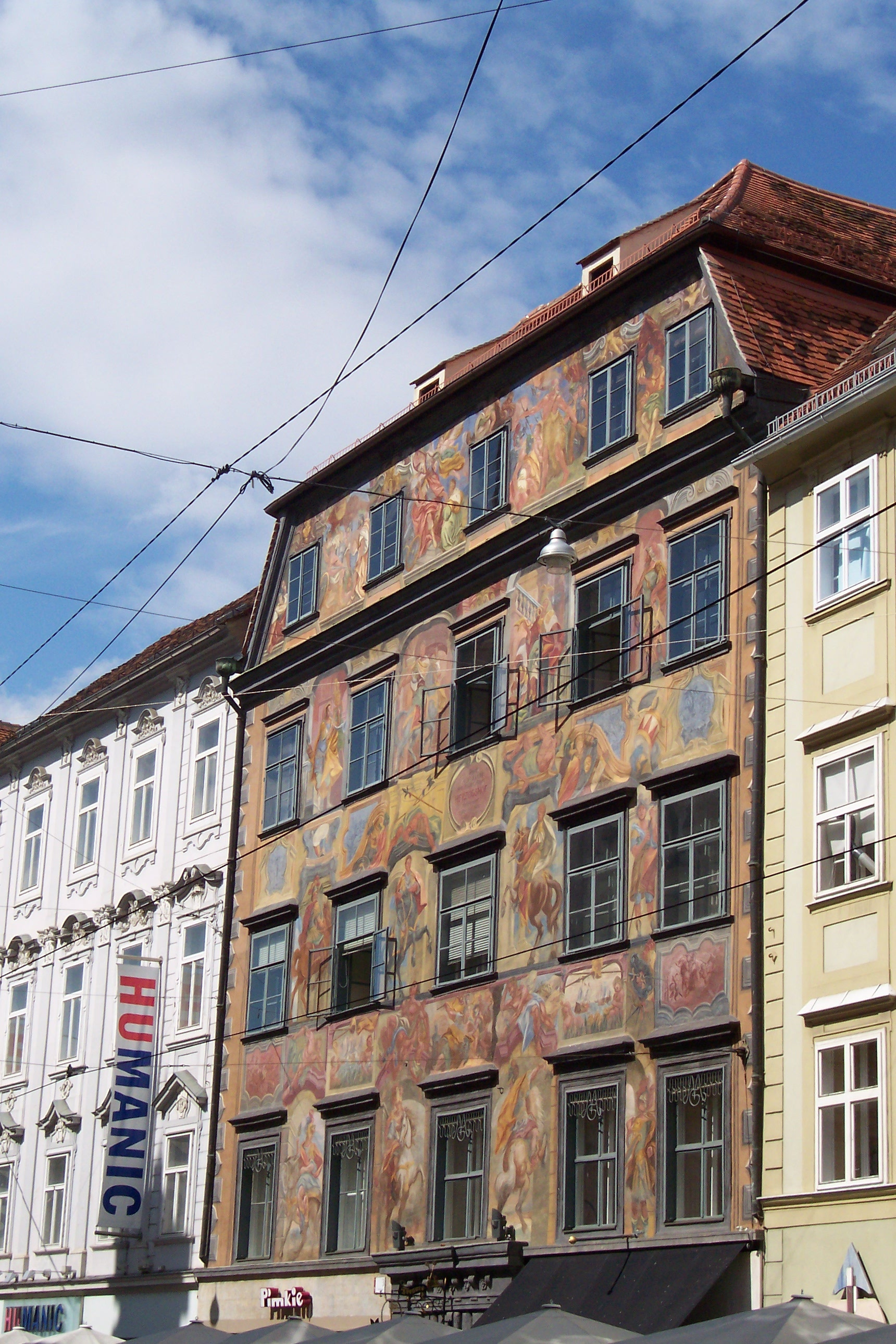
Façade of the "Gemaltes Haus" (Painted House), aka "Herzogshofs" in Graz

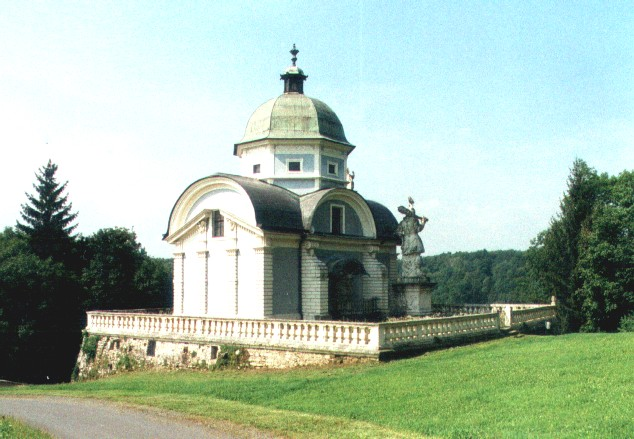
Ruprecht von Eggenberg's Mausoleum on the Schlossberg to Ehrenhausen

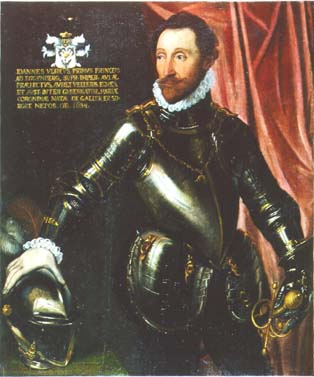
Hans Ulrich von Eggenberg

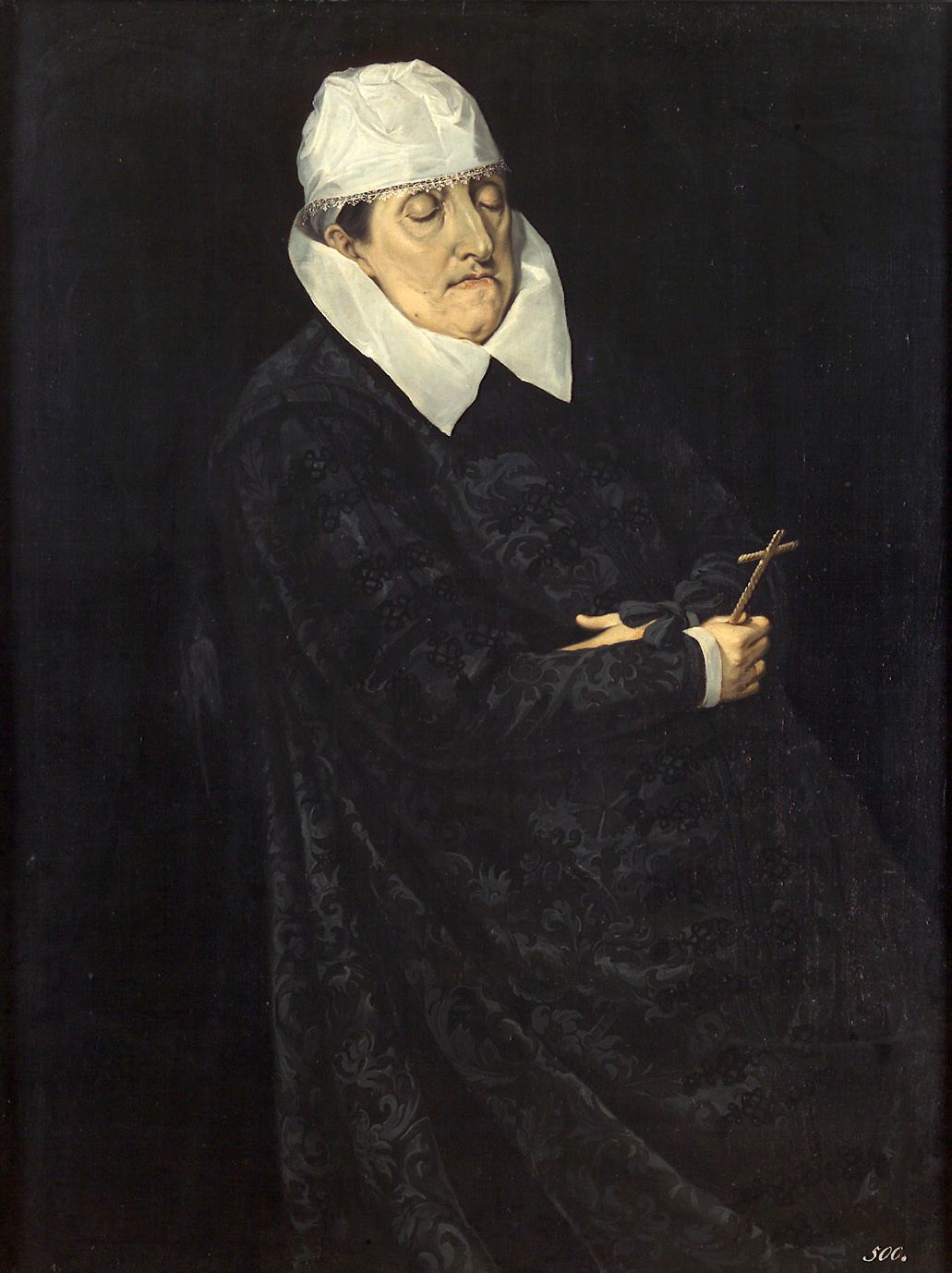
Archduchess Maria Anna of Bavaria, wife of Charles II, Archduke of Austria on death bed

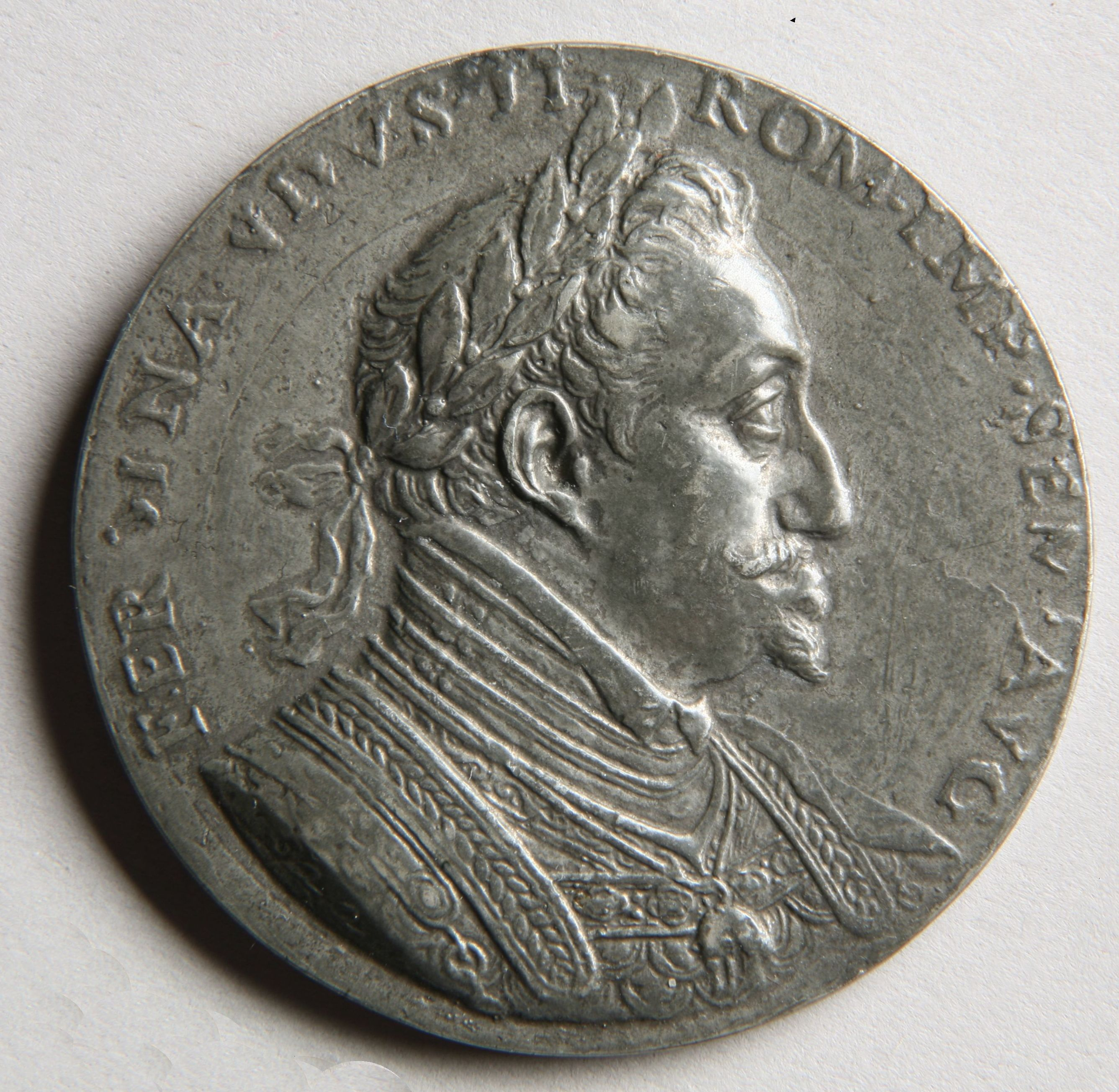
Medallion commemorating the Battle of White Mountain with portrait of Emperor Ferdinand II

== Literature ==
- Werner Strahalm und Peter Laukhardt: Graz. Eine Stadtgeschichte. Edition Strahalm, Graz 2003, S. 149ff.
- Kurt Woisetschläger et al.: Giovanni Pietro de Pomis. Graz: Verlag Styria, 1974. ISBN 3-222-10847-1
- Barbara Kaiser: Schloss Eggenberg. Graz: Christian Brandstätter Verlag, 2006. ISBN 3-902510-80-3 (English Edition) or ISBN 3-902510-96-X (German Edition)
- Tomáš Kleisner: Giovanni Pietro de Pomis Medal of the Battle of the White Mountain Studia Rudolphina 8, 2008, S. 90-93 ISBN 978-80-86890-18-0
