= Eggenberg's golden carriage =

1638 Baroque golden state coach

- Zlatý kočár Eggenbergů (Czech)
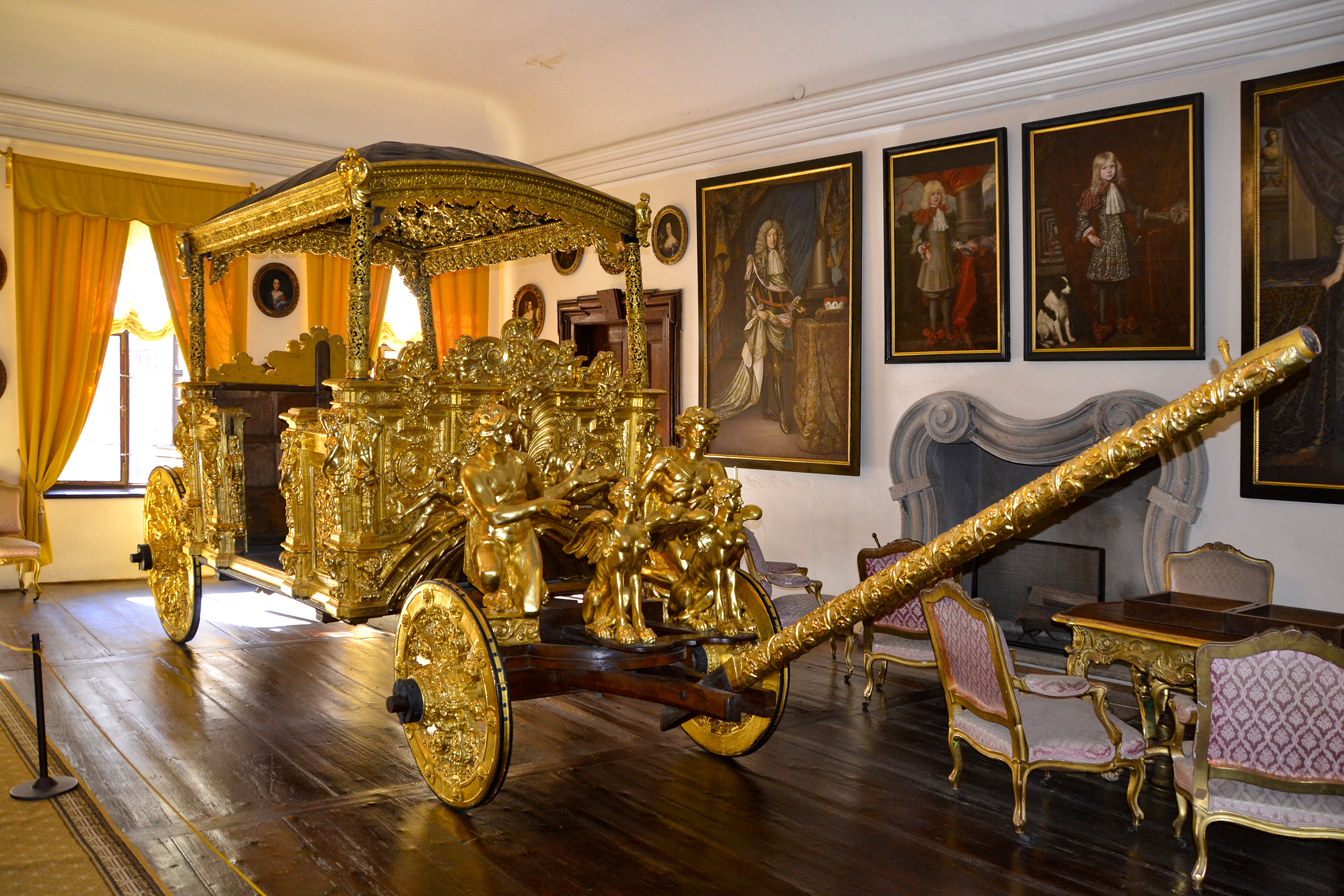
- Artist: Giuseppe Fiocchini (coachbuilder)
- Completion date: 1638
- Type: Baroque state coach
- Dimensions: 3 m × 5.6 m (9.8 ft × 18 ft)
- Condition: Restored; on display
- Location: Český Krumlov Castle
- Website: castle.ckrumlov.cz

The Eggenberg Golden Carriage is an opulent state coach commissioned in 1638 by Johann Anton I. von Eggenberg for his diplomatic mission to Pope Urban VIII in Rome. Crafted in Rome by Giuseppe Fiocchini, the carriage exemplifies the grandeur of Baroque ceremonial vehicles. It was commissioned to announce the election of Emperor Ferdinand III and is considered one of the most valuable exhibits at Český Krumlov Castle.

== Description ==
The carriage that measures approximately 5.6 meters long, 2 meters wide, and 3 meters high was constructed from gilded walnut wood, the carriage's design emulates Renaissance victory chariots. The interior was originally adorned with black velvet upholstery and intricate golden embroidery, featuring four golden wreaths at each corner and a larger central one, complemented by four upholstered chairs.

== History ==
In 1637, following the death of Emperor Ferdinand II, Johann Anton I. von Eggenberg was entrusted with informing Pope Urban VIII of the election of Ferdinand III as the new emperor. To underscore the significance of this diplomatic mission, Eggenberg commissioned the golden carriage. The journey commenced in March 1638 from Vienna, passing through various European cities before reaching Rome in May. The lavish procession and the golden carriage left a lasting impression on the Roman populace.

After the mission, the carriage was housed at Eggenberg Castle near Graz. In 1674, it was transferred to Český Krumlov Castle, where it became a prominent exhibit. Over the centuries, the carriage underwent several relocations and restorations. In 2023, following extensive restoration efforts, the carriage was returned to public display at Český Krumlov Castle, allowing visitors to appreciate its historical and artistic significance.

== Current display ==
As of April 2023, the Eggenberg Golden Carriage is on display at Český Krumlov Castle. The restoration aimed to return the carriage to its original splendor, incorporating replicas of the original decor based on historical inventories and newly discovered photographs. In April 2025 it was reported that the carriage will be temporarily relocated from Český Krumlov Castle in the Czech Republic to Eggenberg Castle in Graz, Austria, for the "Ambition & Illusion" exhibition celebrating the 400th anniversary of the Eggenberg castle complex.

== See also ==
- Eggenberg family
