= Schloss Ehrenhausen =

Castle in Austria

Coordinates: 46.726°N 15.587°E

- Styria, Austria
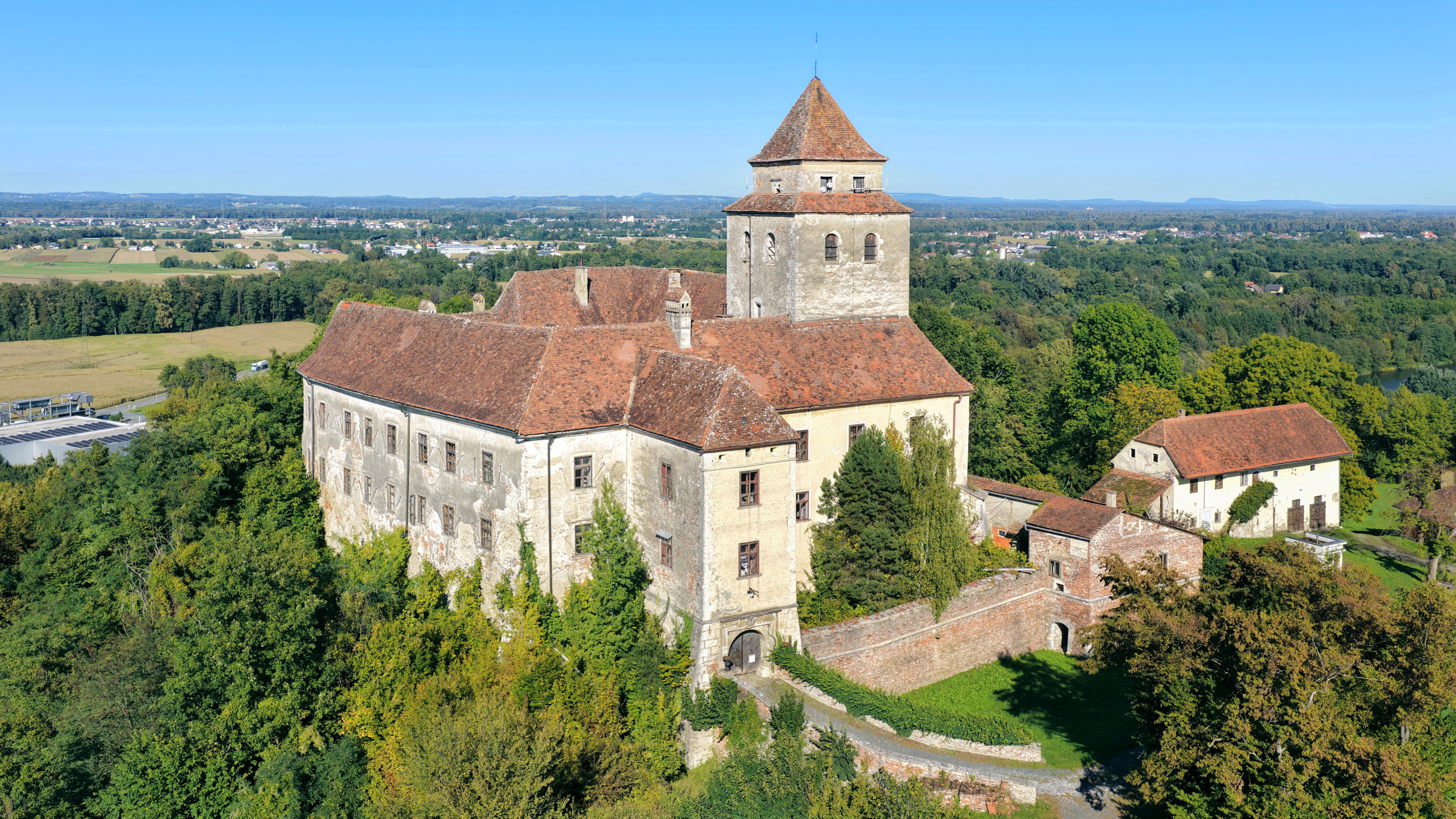

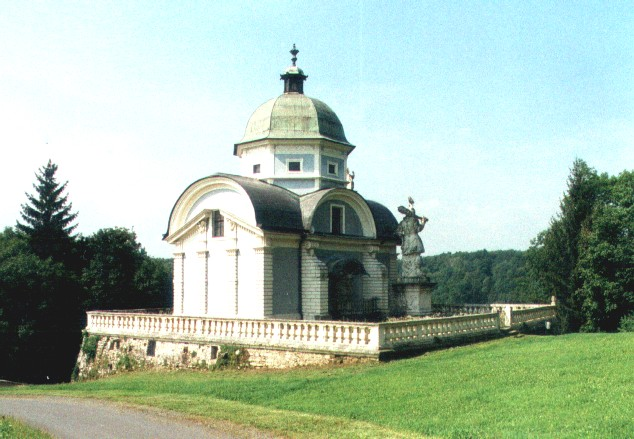
- Mausoleum of Ruprecht von Eggenberg

Site information
- Type: Castle

Schloss Ehrenhausen is a castle in Ehrenhausen, a municipality in the South of the Austrian province of Styria. Schloss Ehrenhausen is situated at an elevation of 297 m.

== See also ==
- List of castles in Austria
