= Duchy of Krumlov =

Coordinates: 48°48′N 14°19′E

Coat of arms of Johann Anton von Eggenberg (1610–1649) as Duke of Krumlov

The Duchy of Krumlov (Krumau in German) was a titular duchy in the southern part of the Kingdom of Bohemia, comprising the town of Český Krumlov and its surrounding territories, now in the Czech Republic.

In 1628, it was given to Hans Ulrich von Eggenberg by King Ferdinand II when he bestowed upon Hans Ulrich the title of Duke of Krumlov. The Bohemian possessions of the Eggenbergs later went to Hans Ulrich's son, Johann Anton von Eggenberg (1610–1649).

In 1649, the title passed to Johann Anton's son, Johann Christian von Eggenberg. He married Princess Marie Ernestine of Schwarzenberg, who was a member of the noble House of Schwarzenberg. Upon the death of Johann Christian, the male line of the House of Eggenberg came to an end.

The death of Marie Ernestine in 1719 caused the Bohemian possessions of the Eggenbergs to pass to her closest relatives in the Schwarzenberg family. As a result, the Duchy of Krumlov was obtained by Prince Adam Francis Charles of Schwarzenberg in 1723, and the title of Duke of Krumlov is reserved for the Head of the House of Schwarzenberg.

== Dukes of Krumlov ==
- Hans Ulrich Prince von Eggenberg (1628–1634)
- Johann Anton Prince von Eggenberg (1634–1649)
- Johann Christian Prince von Eggenberg (1649–1710)
- Marie Ernestine Prince von Eggenberg (1710–1719)
- Adam Francis Prince of Schwarzenberg (1723–1732)
- Joseph I Adam Prince of Schwarzenberg (1732–1782)
- Johann I Prince of Schwarzenberg (1782–1789)
- Joseph II Prince of Schwarzenberg (1789–1833)
- Johann Adolph II Prince of Schwarzenberg (1833–1888)
- Adolph Joseph Prince of Schwarzenberg (1888–1914)
- Johann II Prince of Schwarzenberg (1914–1938)
- Adolph Prince of Schwarzenberg (1938–1950)
- Joseph III Prince of Schwarzenberg (1950–1979)
- Karl Prince of Schwarzenberg (1979–2023)
- Johann Nepomuk Prince of Schwarzenberg (2023–present)
