= Ruprecht von Eggenberg =

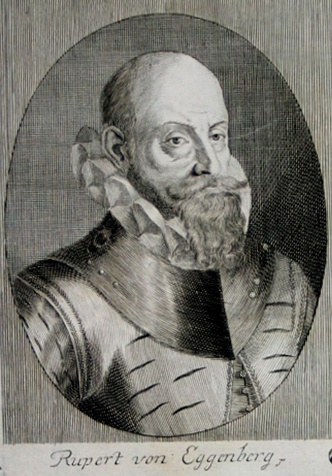
- Ruprecht Freiherr von Eggenberg, kaiserlicher General
- Born: 1546; Habsburg monarchy
- Died: 7 February 1611 (aged 64–65); Graz, Styria, Habsburg monarchy (today's Austria)
- Burial place: Mausoleum in Ehrenhausen
- Military career
- Allegiance: Habsburg monarchy
- Rank: Colonel General
- Conflicts: Battle of Sisak

Ruprecht Freiherr von Eggenberg (1546 – 7 February 1611, Graz, Styria) was a nobleman from the Holy Roman Empire, landowner and Colonel-general from the Duchy of Styria in Inner Austria, then part of the Holy Roman Empire.

== Early life and ancestry ==
Ruprecht was born as the elder son of Christoph von Eggenberg-Ehrenhausen (d. 1551) by his first wife, Helene von Fieger (d. 1568). He was a member of the cadet line of the House of Eggenberg and a cousin of Prince Hans Ulrich von Eggenberg.

== Military career ==
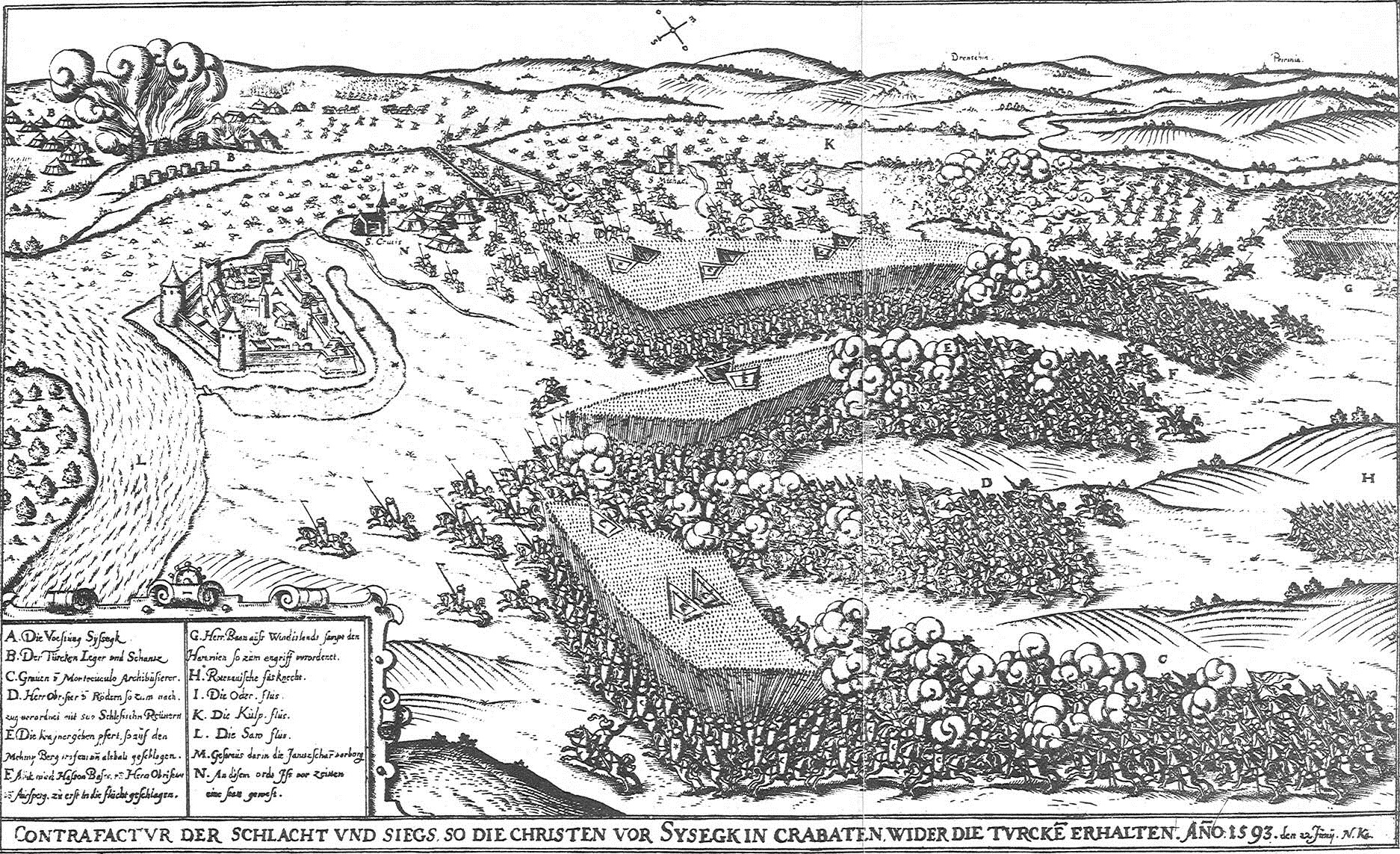
The Christians Before Sisak in Croatia A.D. 1593

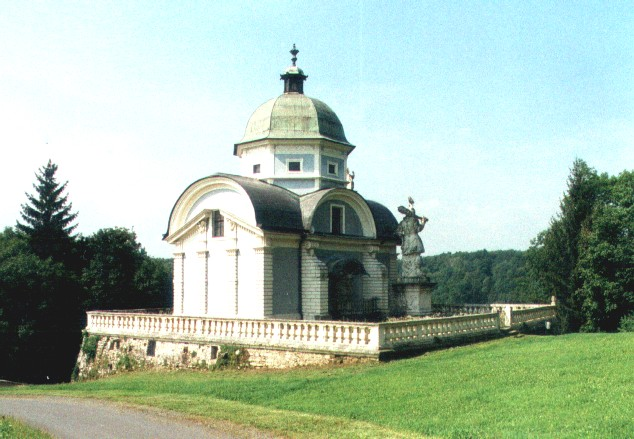
Eggenberg mausoleum in Ehrenhausen, Leibnitz, Styria, Austria.

He chose a military career early on in his life. In 1572 he served as a captain with Spanish forces and saw duty in The Netherlands under the great general Alexander Farnese, Duke of Parma and Piacenza. Ruprecht von Eggenberg benefited greatly from this experience and was ultimately appointed by Charles II, Archduke of Austria to the arch-ducal council and to captain of the guard at the main castle in Graz. Because of the growing threat from the Ottoman Turks, he served as a commander beginning in 1592. Although outnumbered, Eggenberg vanquished the Ottoman forces under the command of Hasan Pasha Predojević at the Battle of Sisak on 22 June 1593. In 1594 Eggenberg received the command of the Austrian troops along the border to what is today Croatia and conquered the Ottoman fortress of Petrinja in 1595. As a hero of the Ottoman wars, in 1596 Eggenberg was appointed the Feldobristen (akin to a colonel in contemporary military ranks) in Upper Hungary and in 1597 he received his appointment as the General-Feld-Obrist-Feldzeugmeister (imperfect translation would be Field Colonel General of the Artillery, denoting the second highest rank as well as an artillery officer). In the end, due to his distinguished service, Ruprecht von Eggenberg was elevated to the rank of Freiherr in 1598 by Rudolf II. He retired from service in 1606 and moved to Graz in what was then the Duchy of Styria where he died in 1611.

== Eggenberg mausoleum in Ehrenhausen ==
In his last will & testament of 1609 Ruprecht von Eggenberg had stipulated that he should be buried in the mausoleum on the Schlossberg to Ehrenhausen in Styria. In 1693, as per his final request, he was buried in the privileged mausoleum. Furthermore, Ruprecht von Eggenberg had mandated in his testament that only male, Catholic members of the family who had attained the rank of general or higher may be buried in his mausoleum. Wolff von Eggenberg also attained the rank of General and was interred in the mausoleum next to his uncle in 1615. The mausoleum was designed by the Graz court artist/architect Giovanni Pietro de Pomis who was also responsible for, most notably, the design of Schloss Eggenberg, the Eggenberg sponsored Mariahilfer Kirche (church) and the mausoleum of Ferdinand II, Holy Roman Emperor in Graz.

== Literature ==
- Karl Johann Casimir von Landmann. Eggenberg, Ruprecht Freiherr von. In: Allgemeine Deutsche Biographie (ADB) Band 5. Leipzig: Duncker & Humblot, 1877, p. 666 f.
- Walther Ernest Heydendorff. Die Fürsten und Freiherren zu Eggenberg und ihre Vorfahren. Graz: Verlag Styria, 1965.
- Barbara Kaiser. Schloss Eggenberg. Graz: Christian Brandstätter Verlag, 2006. ISBN 3-902510-80-3 (English Edition) or ISBN 3-902510-96-X (German Edition) (available through the Joanneum)
- Kurt Woisetschläger, et al. Giovanni Pietro de Pomis. Graz: Verlag Styria, 1974. ISBN 3-222-10847-1
