= Medalist =

Artist who designs small reliefs in metal (plaquettes, badges, coins, etc.)

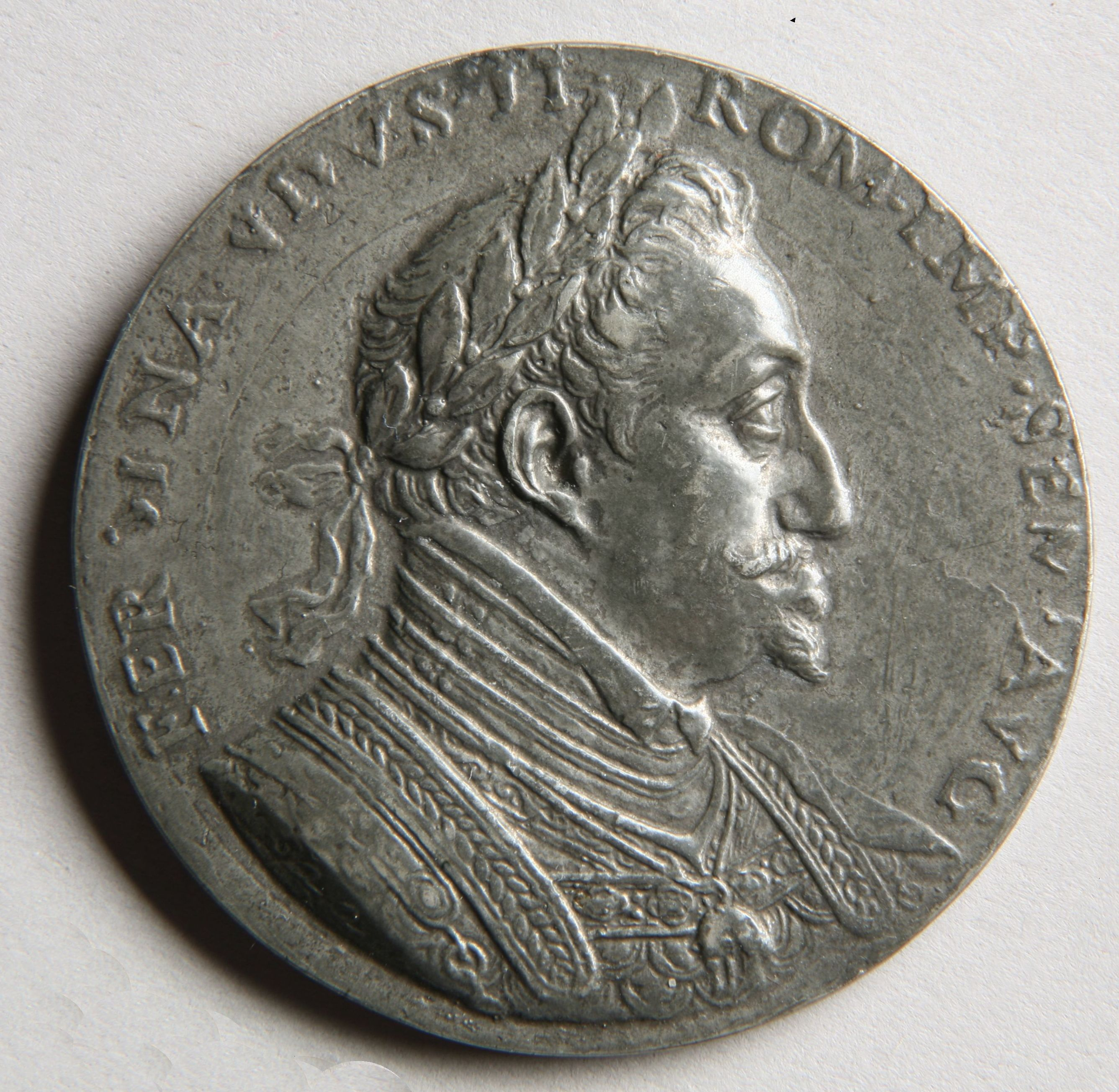
Commemorative medal for the Battle of White Mountain with portrait of Emperor Ferdinand II by Giovanni Pietro de Pomis

A medalist (or medallist) is an artist who designs medals, plaquettes, badges, metal medallions, coins and similar small works in relief in metal. Historically, medalists were typically also involved in producing their designs, and were usually either sculptors or goldsmiths by background. In modern times, medalists are mostly primarily sculptors of larger works, but in the past the number of medals and coins produced were sufficient to support specialists who spent most of their career producing them. From the 19th century, the education of a medalist often began with time as an engraver, or a formal education in an academy, particularly modeling and portraiture. On coins, a mark or symbol signifying the medalist as the original designer was often included in a hidden location and is not to be mistaken for the symbol of the mint master. Artistic medals and plaquettes are often signed prominently by the artist.

== Background ==
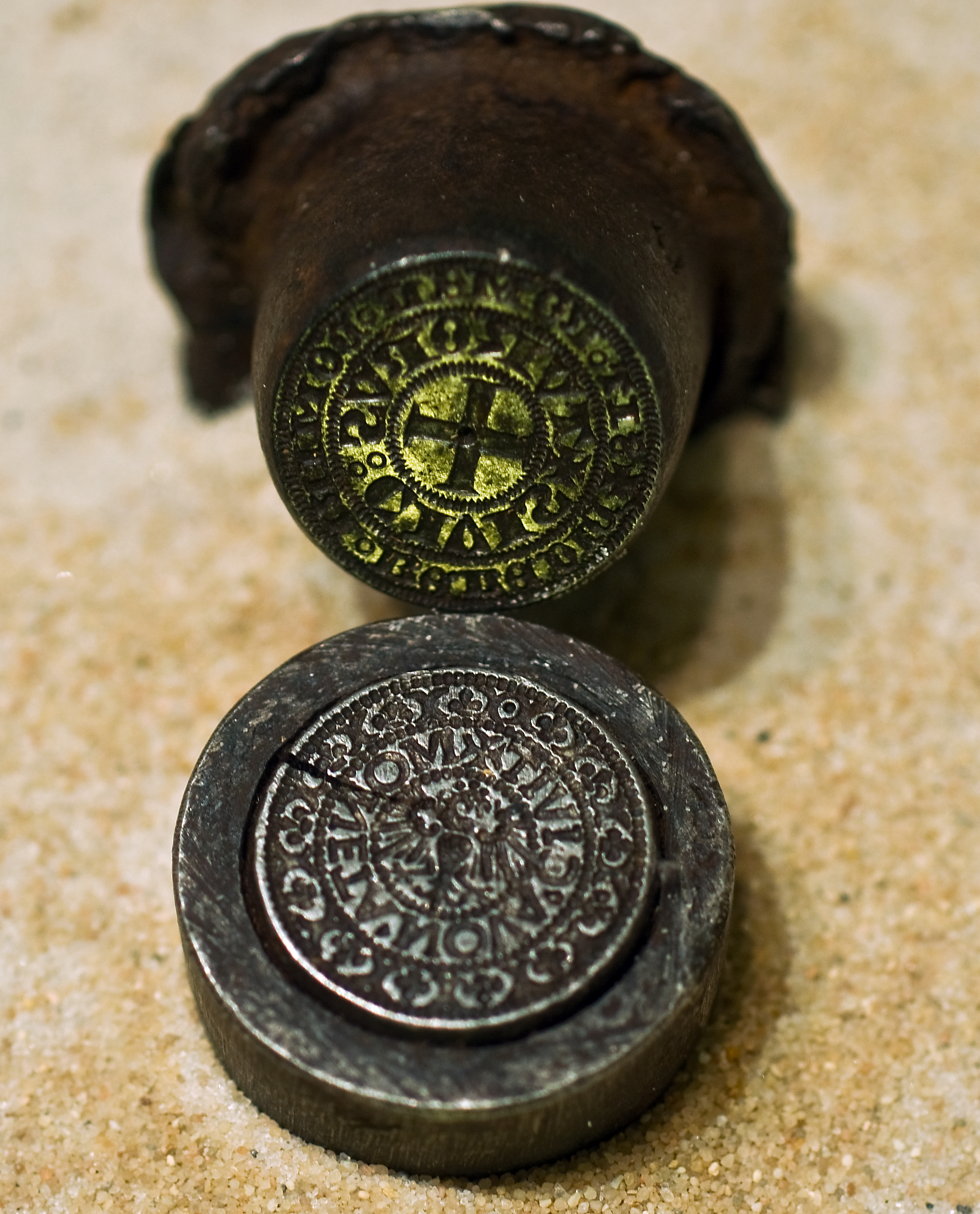
Medieval tornesel coin die from Frankfurt am Main

Artistic medals have been produced since the late Renaissance period, and, after some classical precedents and Late Medieval revivals, the form was essentially invented by Pisanello, who is credited with the first portrait medal, which has remained a very popular type. He cast them like bronze sculptures, rather than minting them like coins.

Medalists are also often confusingly referred to as "engravers" in reference works, referring to the "engraving" of dies, although this is often in fact not the technique used; however many also worked in engraving, the technique in printmaking.

The production of coins is accomplished through the use of either a die for minting coins by hammering or, in modern times, milling or, mostly in prehistoric times and also in Asia, a mold for casting the desired object. Artistic medals and plaquettes have mostly been produced by lost wax casting.

The design for the coin faces were originally engraved into the coin dies. It was necessary to use a burin to engrave the designs directly into the die inverted (i.e. raised areas of finished coin were hollowed out on the die) and as a mirror image so that the finished coin appeared correct. This resulted in the early medalists being called steel-chiselers. Medalists who were contracted by the state to produce the coins and medallions for the mint were often given official state titles. In addition to their state contracts, medalists were also allowed to earn income through private commissions for medals.

== See also ==
- List of medallists
