= Wolff von Eggenberg =

Austrian nobleman

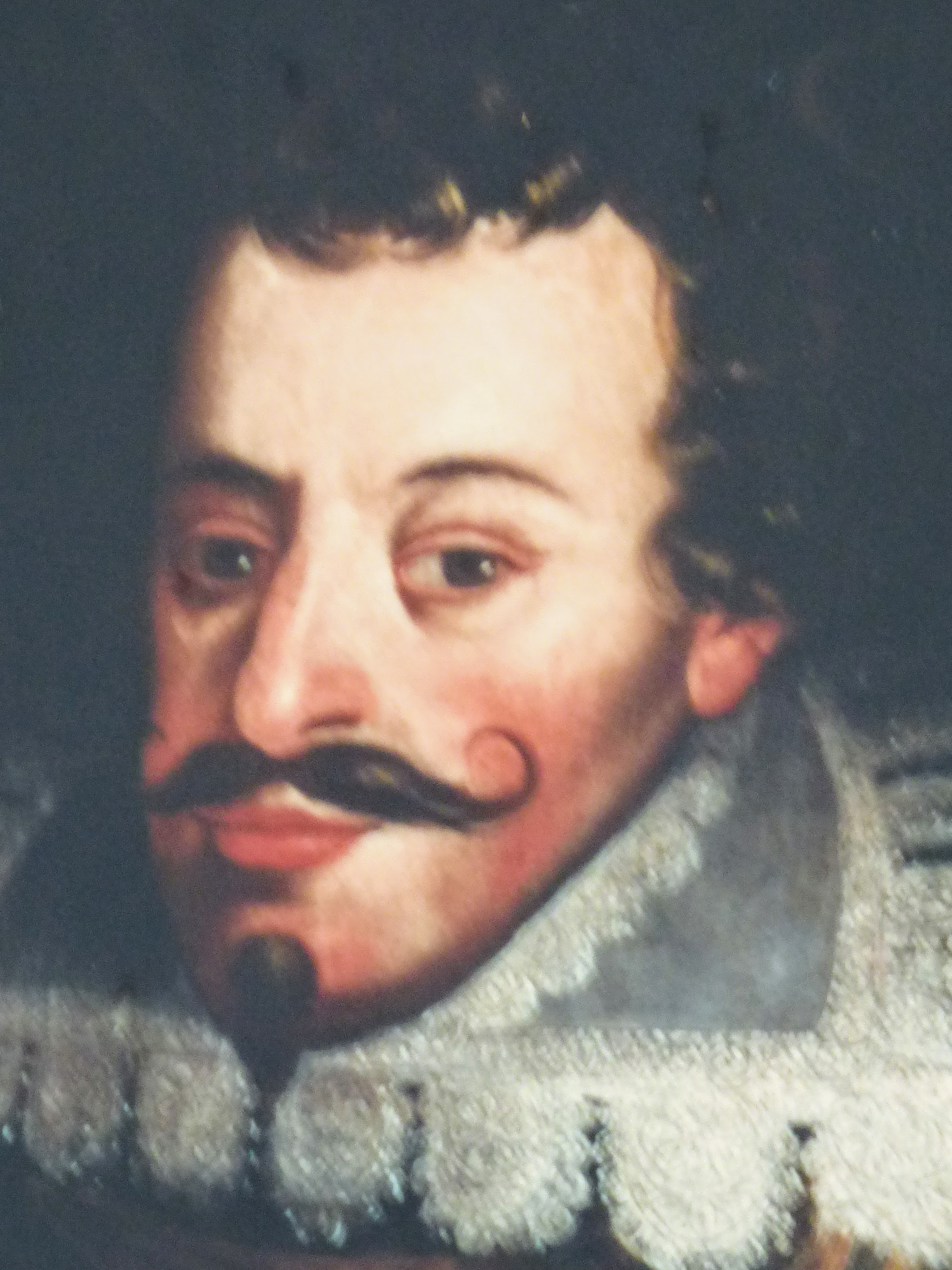
- Wolff von Eggenberg
- Born: 1580; Habsburg monarchy
- Died: 1615 (aged 34–35); Fortress of Karlstadt, Habsburg monarchy (today's Croatia)
- Burial place: Mausoleum in Ehrenhausen
- Military career
- Allegiance: Habsburg Monarchy
- Rank: Colonel-General

Wolfgang Wolff von Eggenberg (born 1580 - died 1615) was an Austrian nobleman, landowner, military officer and Freiherr of the House of Eggenberg.

== Biography ==
Wolfgang was born as the eldest child of Bartholomäus von Eggenberg-Ehrenhausen (1547–1585) and his wife, Justine von Breunner (1555–1592). After the death of his father, his mother remarried to Christoph Baron von Teuffenbach (1545–1598) and from this marriage he had one half-brother, Baron Friedrich von Teuffenbach-Mayrhofen (1585–1621), one of the leaders of the Protestant uprising in Moravia; executed in Innsbruck, 1621.

As Wolff only had one younger sister, Baroness Johanna Eleonore Galler von Schwamberg (1582–1649), he was the sole male heir of his uncle, Ruprecht von Eggenberg. Like his uncle, Wolff von Eggenberg chose a military career and received the command of Imperial Forces as General-Obrist (imperfect translation is Colonel-General) on the border to Croatia. He hasn't married and didn't have any known children. With his death in 1615, the Ehrenhausen cadet line of the family came to an end, while the princely line of the House of Eggenberg became extinct more than 100 years later, in 1717.

== Death ==
He died in 1615, at the age of 45, in the fortress Karlstadt. His uncle, Ruprecht von Eggenberg had mandated in his testament that only male, Catholic members of the family who had attained the rank of general or higher may be buried in his family mausoleum in Ehrenhausen. As Wolfgang had fulfilled the criteria, he was interred beside his uncle in the family mausoleum.

== Literature ==
- Die Fürsten und Freiherren zu Eggenberg und ihre Vorfahren. By Walther Ernest Heydendorff. Graz: Verlag Styria, 1965.
