= Hans Ulrich von Eggenberg =

Prince Hans Ulrich von Eggenberg
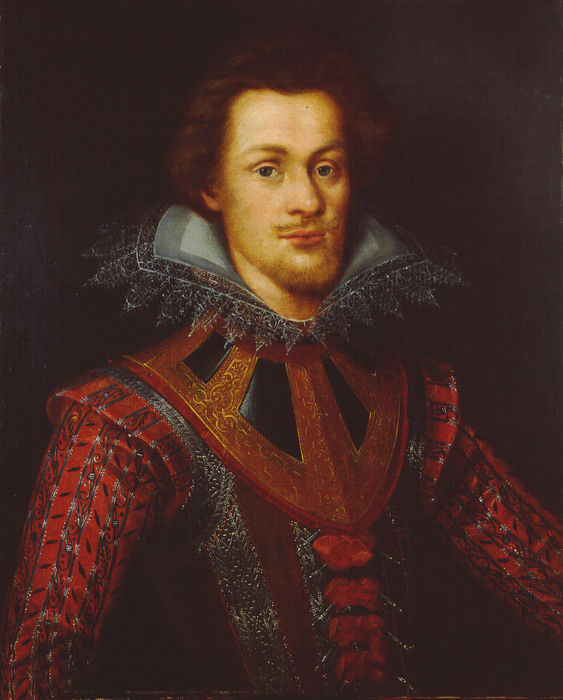
- Prince Hans Ulrich von Eggenberg

President of the Geheimen Rates (Privy Council)
- In office 1615–1634
- Monarch: Ferdinand II, Holy Roman Emperor
- Succeeded by: Count Maximilian von Trautmansdorff

Personal details
- Born: June 1568 Graz, Austria (Styria)
- Died: 18 October 1634 (aged 66) Ljubljana, Slovenia (Carniola)
- Spouse: Sidonia Maria Thannhausen
- Children: Maria Sidonia, Maria Franziska, Maria Anna, Maria Margarita, Johann Anton
- Parent(s): Seyfried von Eggenberg; Anna Benigna Galler von Schwanberg
- Education: Tübinger Stift
- Occupation: Diplomat, governor, financier
- Profession: Statesman, nobleman

Prince Hans Ulrich von Eggenberg (1568 – 18 October 1634) was an Austrian statesman, a son of Seyfried von Eggenberg, Lord of Erbersdorf (1526–1594), and great-grandson of Balthasar Eggenberger (died 1493). He was a prominent member of the House of Eggenberg and gained the title of Duke of Krumau.

== Biography ==
Hans Ulrich von Eggenberg may only have been of simple parentage and had a Lutheran Protestant upbringing, but by his own means, he succeeded in becoming one of the most influential Catholic princes in the Holy Roman Empire within just a few decades, outshining even his successful cousin, Ruprecht von Eggenberg.

His career, however, developed too quickly and too successfully for it to go unnoticed and unenvied. Contemporaries and historians have had differing opinions regarding Eggenberg's character: seeing him as a man ... who is successful at everything he does, a fellow of good fortune, with a reputation of being completely loyal to the Emperor, highly gifted and reliable, but also a corrupt and slippery customer. Both contemporaries and historians are, however, in agreement about his brilliant diplomatic talent, his personal charm and cleverness, and his extraordinary manner of dealing with people.

Hans Ulrich von Eggenberg was born in June 1568 in Graz and had a Protestant upbringing. However, little is known about his childhood and youth. In 1583, he traveled to Tübingen, the heartland of German Protestantism, to study at the renowned Protestant university, Tübinger Stift, where he received a profound education. A famous associate of Hans Ulrich's, Johannes Kepler, also received a first-rate education at the Tübinger Stift and went on to write his first work, Mysterium Cosmographicum, while teaching in Graz. The intellectual dimensions of this education were to later form the basis of the complex programmatic orientations of his new residence, Schloss Eggenberg.

After completing his studies, he embarked on the Grand Tour, a long educational journey undertaken by young noblemen of the period, which took him through the Netherlands, Spain, and Italy. After the death of his father in 1594, he returned to Graz to take over the safeguarding and administration of his estate and then soon began his career at the Court of Archduke Ferdinand in Graz. To be able to serve at court, he had had to convert to the Catholic faith and subsequently also supported the strict counter-reformatory policies of the Archduke. Hans Ulrich's influence became ever stronger at the Inner Austrian court due to interventions by the Archduchess Maria of Bavaria, Ferdinand's mother. Although ten years his senior, Eggenberg soon became Ferdinand's closest friend and confidant, a relationship that was to last all his life.

With Eggenberg's help, Archduke Ferdinand was elected Ferdinand II, Holy Roman Emperor of the German Nation in 1619. In his positions as the President of the Geheimrat (Privy Council) and Lord Chamberlain (Obersthofmeister) to the Emperor, Hans Ulrich, the son of a merchant family from Graz, became one of the most significant and influential statesmen of his time during the period of the Thirty Years' War.
Being something akin to a prime minister according to contemporary political understanding, it is said that between the years of 1619 to 1634, Ferdinand II never made a significant political decision without seeking the advice of Hans Ulrich, who remained loyal to him throughout this period and the rest of his life.

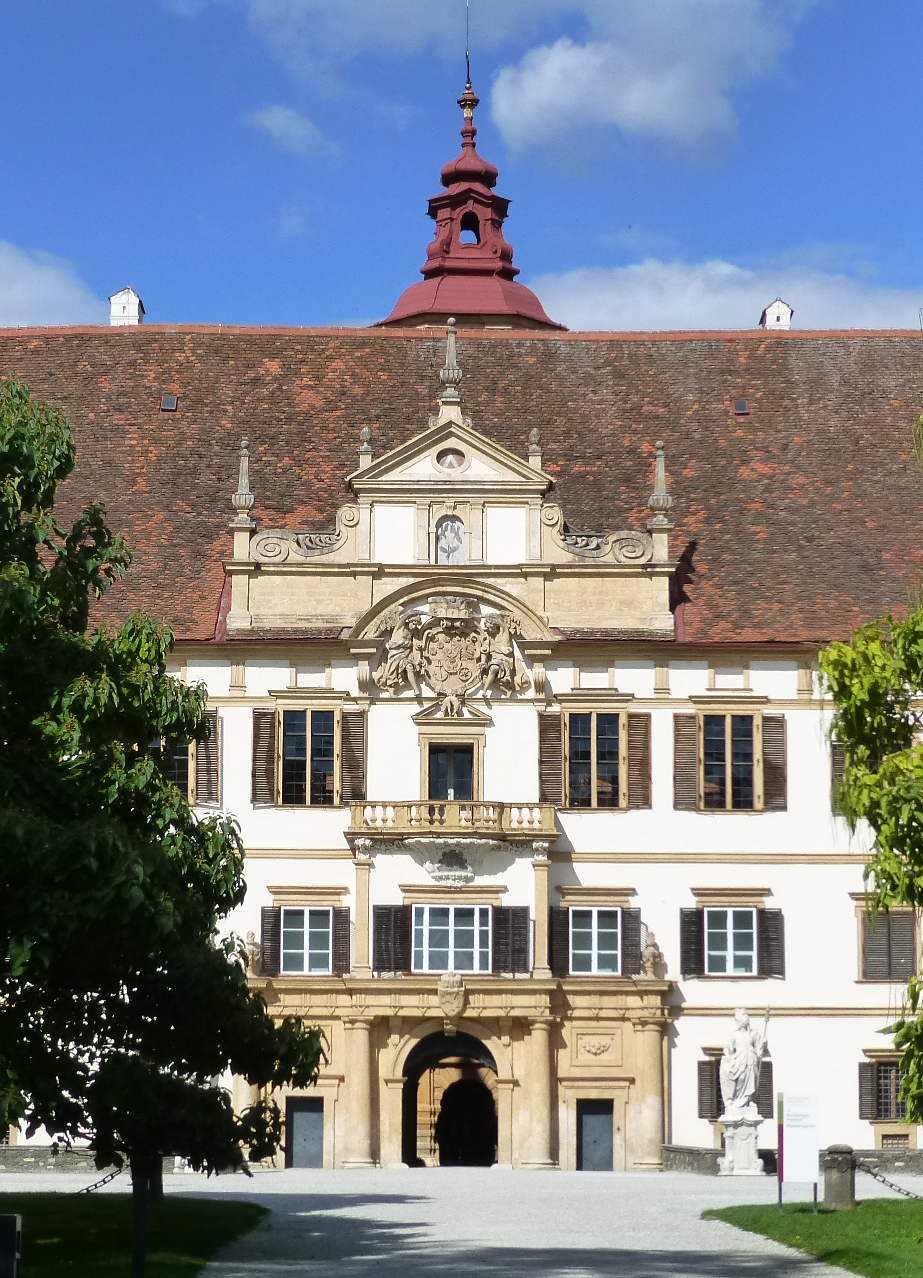
Eggenberg Palace, built 1625–35, entry portal with the Eggenberg arms

The grateful Emperor rewarded his loyal adviser by bestowing on him the highest honors and ranks of the realm. In 1598, his cousin Ruprecht von Eggenberg and the entire Eggenberg family, including Hans Ulrich, were elevated into the Freiherrnstand (Baron's Estate). In 1620, King Philip III of Spain named Hans Ulrich a Knight of the Golden Fleece. In 1623, Hans Ulrich received a promotion into the Reichsfürstenstand, and the Eggenbergs were from then on of princely rank. By 1628, Hans Ulrich was also named Duke of Krumau.

Hans Ulrich reached the pinnacle of his career in 1625 when he was made Gubernator (Governor) of Inner Austria. From this point on, he ruled "in the name of the Emperor" the Inner Austrian Patrimonial Lands with absolute power comparable only to an archduke in political, legal and military matters. He was the only non-Habsburg governor to have ever been awarded and exercised such a position. He was largely responsible for the return to imperial service of Albrecht von Wallenstein, and retired from public life after Wallenstein's assassination.

His office also prompted him to commission the conversion of the medieval family castle on the western edge of Graz into a new and glorious residence, Schloss Eggenberg, to appropriately represent his new status. Unfortunately, he died of severe gout in October 1634, before the palace was completed. Alongside his four daughters, Hans Ulrich also produced a male heir to the Eggenberg dynasty, Johann Anton I, who succeeded in attaining a position even his illustrious father had failed to attain: a seat among the princes of the empire in the Reichstag.

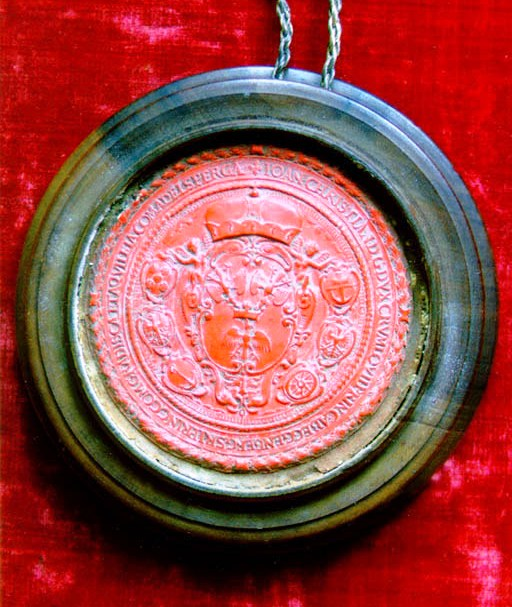
Seal of Hans Ulrich von Eggenberg

As an imperial minister, Hans Ulrich had skilfully succeeded in guiding his master on the throne despite facing numerous dangers and constant upheavals during these times of great change. He slowly and consistently worked on his ideas of a united "empire", which he saw as a strengthened central imperial power, at the expense of the feudal interests of the old noble families and the desire for autonomy of the princes of the realm. This way, he became one of the major architects of the absolutist Habsburg state, which was to dominate and shape the century to come.

In Austria, Hans Ulrich has left a historical legacy behind. His masterpiece, Schloss Eggenberg, was the main motif on one of the most famous silver collectors coins: the 10 euro Eggenberg Palace coin minted on 10 September 2002.

On 1 August 2010, UNESCO expanded the registry listing of the City of Graz - Historic Centre to include Schloss Eggenberg among the World Cultural Heritage Sites.

== Literature ==
- Hans Ulrich Fürst von Eggenberg: Freund und erster Minister Kaiser Ferdinand II. By Hans von Zwiedineck-Südenhorst. Charleston, SC: BiblioBazaar, 2009. (new edition of digitally preserved original German text printed in Vienna in 1880, printed in Leipzig by Amazon Distribution GmbH) ISBN 1-113-02782-7
- F. Mareš, Beitrage zur Geschichte der Beziehungen des Fursten J. U. von Eggenberg (Prague, 1893)
- Schloss Eggenberg. By Barbara Kaiser. Graz: Christian Brandstätter Verlag, 2006. ISBN 3-902510-80-3 (English Edition) or ISBN 3-902510-96-X (German Edition) (available in German or English editions through the Universalmuseum Joanneum)
- The Thirty Years War. By Cicely Veronica Wedgwood. Garden City, NY: Anchor Books, 1961. (Re-issued by NYRB Classics, 2005. ISBN 1-59017-146-2)
- Die Fürsten und Freiherren zu Eggenberg und ihre Vorfahren. By Walther Ernest Heydendorff. Graz: Verlag Styria, 1965.
