= Ehrenhausen =

- Former municipality
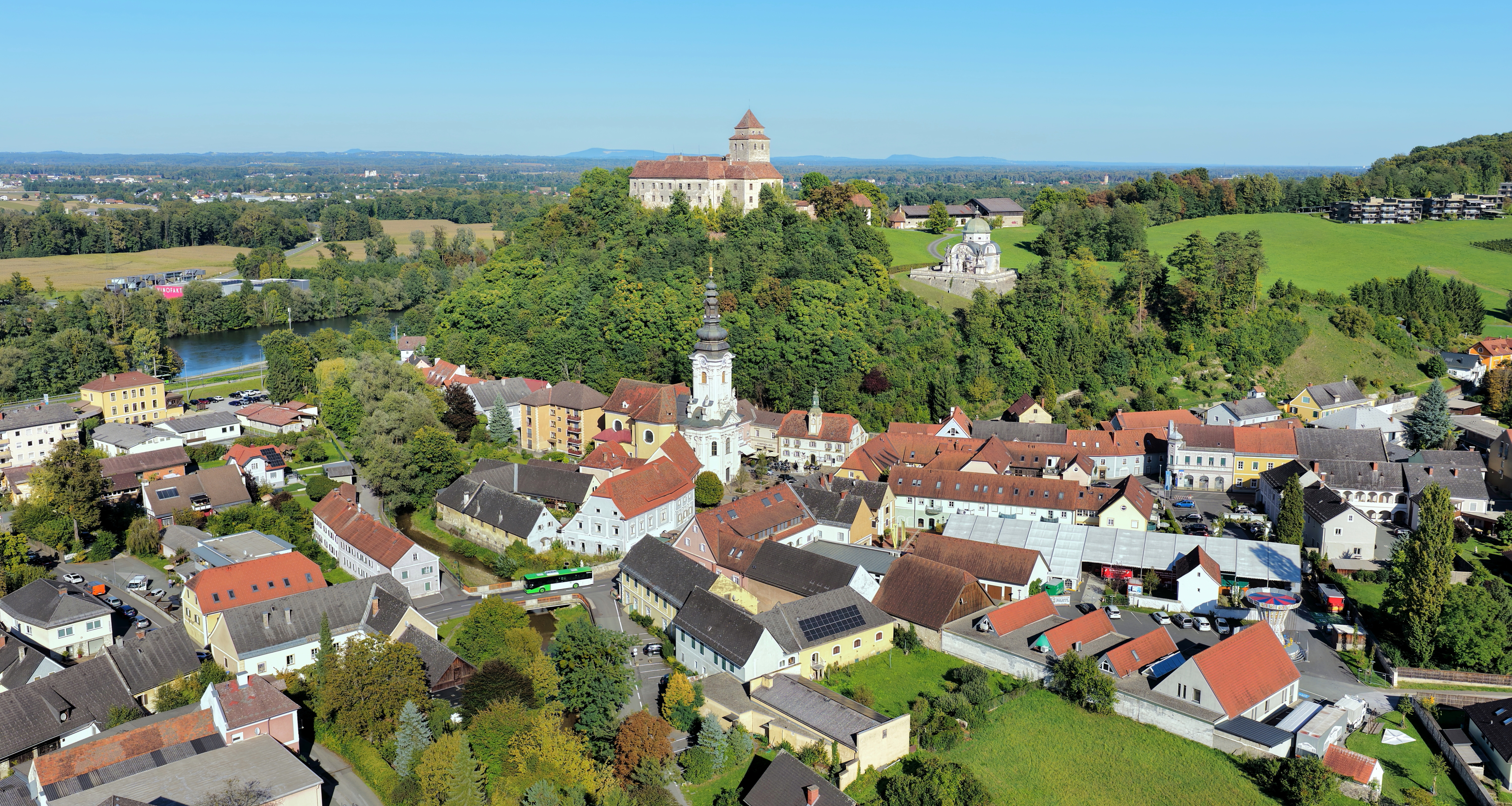
- West-southwest view of Ehrenhausen

- Coat of arms

- Location within Austria
- Coordinates: 46°43′35″N 15°35′04″E
- Country: Austria
- State: Styria
- District: Leibnitz

Area
  - Total: 3.03 km^{2} (1.17 sq mi)
- Elevation: 258 m (846 ft)

Population (1 January 2016)
  - Total: 1,019
  - Density: 336/km^{2} (871/sq mi)
- Time zone: UTC+1 (CET)
  - Summer (DST): UTC+2 (CEST)
- Postal code: 8461
- Area code: +43 3453
- Website: www.ehrenhausen.at

Ehrenhausen is a former municipality in the district of Leibnitz in Styria, Austria. Since the 2015 Styria municipal structural reform, it is part of the municipality Ehrenhausen an der Weinstraße.

== Geography ==
Ehrenhausen lies on the Mur river in southeastern Styria south of Leibnitz close to the border of Slovenia.

== Personalities ==
The district was at one time the seat of a branch of the Eggenberg dynasty and the Schlossberg to Ehrenhausen features the mausoleum of Ruprecht von Eggenberg and his nephew Wolf von Eggenberg which was designed by Italian painter and architect Giovanni Pietro de Pomis, who was the court painter and architect of Ferdinand II, Holy Roman Emperor.
