= Eggenberg Palace, Graz =

Eggenberg Palace
- Schloss Eggenberg (in German)
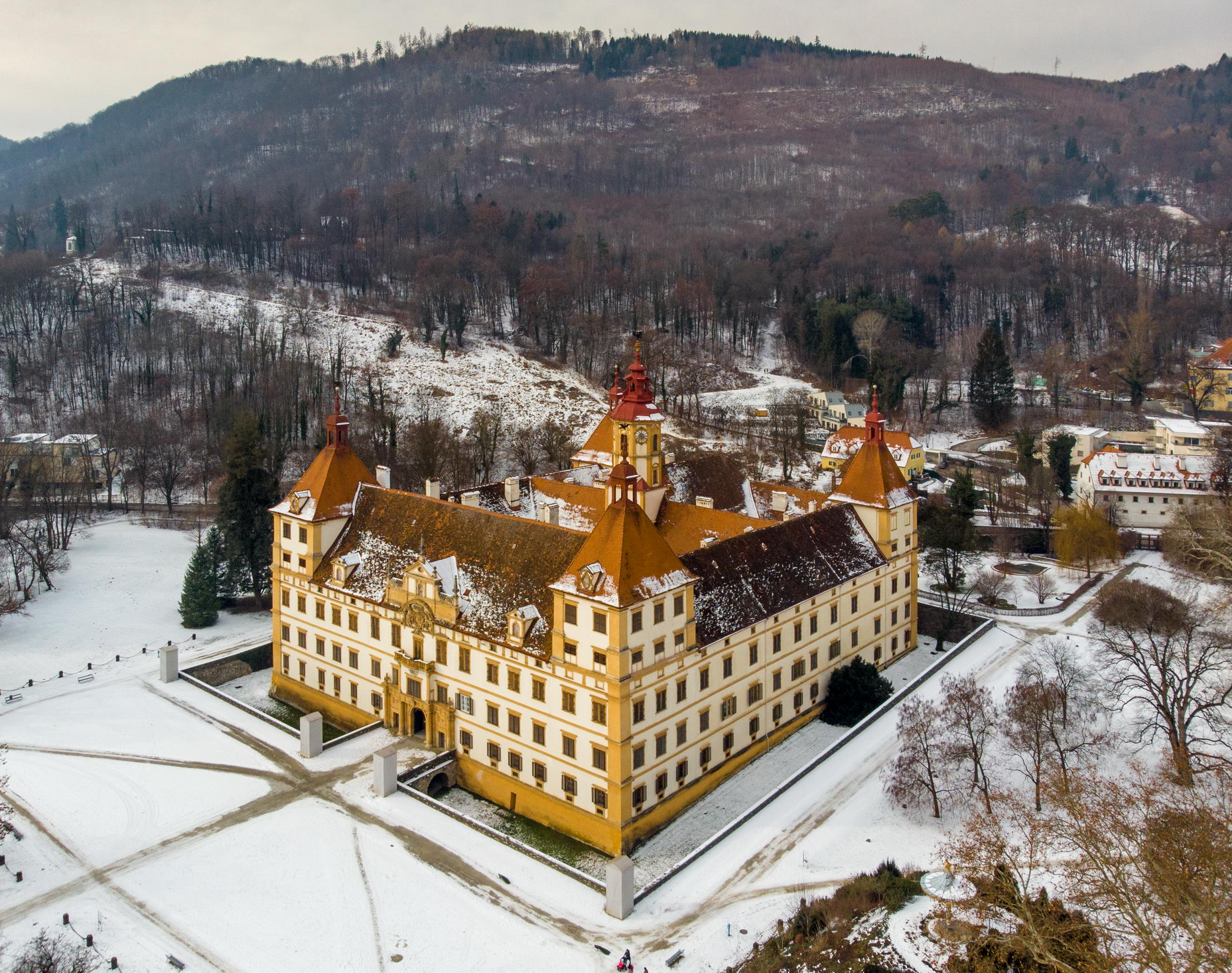
- Aerial view in January 2019

General information
- Type: Palace
- Architectural style: Gothic and Baroque
- Location: Graz, Styria, Austria
- Coordinates: 47.07389°N 15.39129°E
- Elevation: 365 m (1,198 ft)
- Current tenants: Palace State Rooms, Alte Galerie, Coin Collection, Roman Stonework Collection, Archaeology Collection
- Construction started: after 1460 (medieval section), 1625 (Baroque expansion)
- Completed: c. 1635 (structure), 1685 (accouterments), 1762 (piano nobile)
- Cost: over 105,000 guilder
- Client: Universalmuseum Joanneum
- Owner: The State of Styria

Height
- Height: 50 m (164 ft) (central tower)

Dimensions
- Diameter: 65 m x 80 m (palace footprint)
- Other dimensions: 90,000 m² (palace grounds)

Technical details
- Floor count: 3
- Floor area: 8,000 m²

Design and construction
- Architect: Giovanni Pietro de Pomis
- Other designers: Hans Adam Weissenkircher (court painter)

UNESCO World Heritage Site
- Official name: City of Graz – Historic Centre and Schloss Eggenberg
- Type: Cultural
- Criteria: ii, iv
- Designated: 1999 (23rd session)
- Reference no.: 931bis
- Region: Europe and North America
- Extensions: 2010 (34th session) included Schloss Eggenberg

References
- Schloss Eggenberg. By Barbara Kaiser. Graz: Christian Brandstätter Verlag, 2006. ISBN 978-3-902510-80-8; Planet Eggenberg. By Hermann Götz. Graz: Leykam Medien AG, 2005.

Eggenberg Palace (German: Schloss Eggenberg) in Graz, is the most significant Baroque palace complex in the Austrian state of Styria. With its preserved accouterments, the extensive scenic gardens, as well as some special collections from the Universalmuseum Joanneum housed in the palace and surrounding park, Schloss Eggenberg ranks among the most valuable cultural treasures of Austria. Eggenberg Palace is situated at an elevation of 381 meters on the western edge of the city. Its architectural design and the still visible imprint of centuries of history continue to bear witness to the vicissitude and patronage of the one-time mightiest dynasty in Styria, the House of Eggenberg.

In 2010, the significance of Schloss Eggenberg was recognised with an expansion to the listing of the Graz Historic Old Town among the UNESCO World Cultural Heritage Sites.

Surrounded by walls, with a huge portal facing West, the palace is located in the Eggenberg district of Graz and can be reached by tram. The northern corner of the palace grounds features the Planetary Garden and Lapidarium of Roman stonework as well as the entrance to the new Archeology Museum, which houses the Cult Wagon of Strettweg. At ground level, the palace houses a numismatic collection (Coin Cabinet) located in the former rooms of Balthasar Eggenberger, owner of the imperial minting license and operations in the Late Middle Ages. On the upper level, the Alte Galerie encompasses a large array of paintings, sculptures, and other works of art from the medieval era through the early modern period, spanning five centuries of European art history.

== History ==
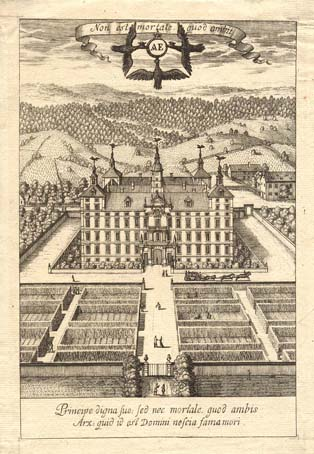
Ideal perspective of Eggenberg. Copper etching by Andreas Trost, before 1700

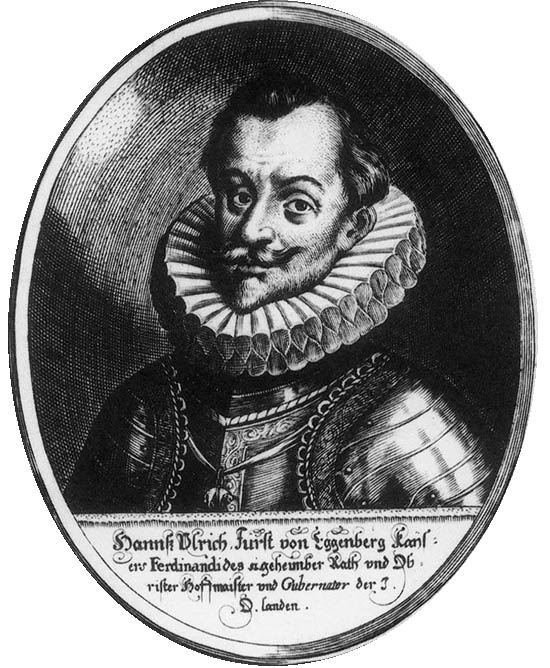
Copper engraving with portrait of Prince Hans Ulrich von Eggenberg, 17th century

=== Construction ===
At first glance, Schloss Eggenberg presents itself as a uniform, new construction of the 17th century. Nevertheless, large portions of the building date back to the Late Middle Ages and construction continued throughout the early modern era.

Before 1460 Balthasar Eggenberger, financier to Frederick III, Holy Roman Emperor, bought property in the west of Graz which became a fixed noble residence in the family name. In the subsequent years the family residence was constructed and expanded. By 1470, a square Gothic chapel had been constructed in the tower. A Papal indulgence from 30 May 1470 refers to the "Capella Beate Marie Virginis Sita in Castro Eckenperg", the Chapel of the Virgin Mary in Eggenberg Castle, which became the nucleus of the new palace built by Balthasar's great-grandson, Hans Ulrich von Eggenberg.

The younger cousin of General Ruprecht von Eggenberg, Hans Ulrich, as a superb diplomat and statesman, steered the foreign policy of his Emperor, Ferdinand II, while Eggenberg's counterpart and political adversary, Cardinal Richelieu of France, guided that of King Louis XIII during Thirty Years War. As prime minister (in contemporary political jargon) and close, personal confidant of Ferdinand II, Hans Ulrich wanted a grandiose residence representing his new status and authority when he was named "Gubernator" (Governor) of Inner Austria after the emperor chose Vienna as his imperial capital. In 1625 Prince Hans Ulrich von Eggenberg commissioned court architect Giovanni Pietro de Pomis with the planning of his new palace, inspired by El Escorial in Spain. As an architect, painter, and medailleur (designer and minter of medals), de Pomis, originally from Lodi near Milan, became the most important artist at the Grazer court. Incorporating the original medieval family residence into the new palace, de Pomis himself oversaw the construction work up to his death in 1631. Fortress master builder Laurenz van de Syppe continued the work for two years until the building was finished, in the end, by both of de Pomis' site foremen, Pietro Valnegro and Antonio Pozzo. The shell appears to have been completed by 1635 or 1636. Between 1641 and 1646 work on the ornamentation was brought to a close.

In 1666, Johann Seyfried von Eggenberg, grandson of Hans Ulrich, began to develop the palace according to the splendor and grandeur of the Baroque style and in 1673 the residence again entered the limelight as Archduchess Claudia Felicitas of Tyrol was a guest in the palace on the occasion of her wedding in Graz to Leopold I, Holy Roman Emperor. Under Prince Johann Seyfried, the comprehensive cycle of ceiling coverings of approximately 600 paintings in the rooms of the piano nobile was accomplished in just 7 years. Hans Adam Weissenkircher began his service as the court painter of the princely Eggenberger court in 1678. He finished the painting cycle of the main festival hall, the famous Planetary Room, in 1684/85. With this, the first phase of accouterment work on Schloss Eggenberg was completed.

After the extinction of the male line of the Eggenberg family, the Eggenberger state rooms were left in a half-emptied and neglected state. The husband of the last Eggenberger princess, Johann Leopold Count Herberstein, ordered a comprehensive renewal of the complex. Between 1754 and 1762 the building and the garden underwent their second major phase of ornamentation, this time in complete accordance with the tastes of the Rococo. Above all, the accouterment of the piano nobile was modernized. Nevertheless, the Planetary Room and the entire cycle of ceiling paintings remained almost unchanged. Thus, the works limited themselves to wall decorations, stoves and pieces of furniture. In keeping with the taste of the times, three East Asian cabinets were introduced and the state rooms received new wall coverings. The most extensive change was probably the demolition of the Eggenberger palace theater, in the place of which a baroque palace church was established. The supervisor of these works was the Grazer court architect Joseph Hueber, a student of Johann Lukas von Hildebrandt.

The third phase of the changes came during the 19th century and was limited to the living quarters on the 1st storey (2nd floor in American English) of the palace. The piano nobile remained untouched and unused for a full century. The primary focus of attention of this period was the total transformation of the Baroque formal garden into a romantic landscape garden after the English fashion.

The entire complex remained in the possession of the Herberstein family up to 1939. Shortly before the war, Schloss Eggenberg was acquired with the park by the state of Styria. The oldest museum in Austria, the Joanneum, which was established on 26 November 1811 by Archduke Johann of Austria, took over management of the palace and park. The Joanneum conducted extensive restoration work to repair the damage that occurred during World War II and the subsequent occupation by the Allies and in 1953 Schloss Eggenberg and the Eggenberg Schloss Park were finally opened again to the public.

=== Scheme ===
With his new residence, Hans Ulrich von Eggenberg, the mental inspiration behind the complex program, realized an architectural concept deeply influenced by the humanist notions of magic as the praxis of natural philosophy and of the rational order of the world. Above all, astronomy, astrology and alchemy were major components of the education of a worldly prince. In addition to representing the prince's new rank, all these aspects flowed into the vision of the new building as a symbol of the cosmos as a well-organized, hierarchical, logico-mathematically explicable system.

Schloss Eggenberg relies on the Gregorian calendar as a basis for this constructed universe. The palace has 365 exterior windows, one for each day of the year. Of these, 52 are on the 24 rooms of the piano nobile representing the weeks of one year. The 2nd storey contains these 24 state rooms in a ring-shaped arrangement which symbolize the hours in a single day. Every floor in the building bares exactly 31 rooms counting the maximum number of days in a calendar month. The 52 windows of the piano nobile with the 8 windows of the Planetary Room make a total of 60, representing both the number of seconds in a minute and the minutes in an hour.

The palace is erected on a rectangular plan with the geometrical center being formed by the middle tower with its Gothic chapel. On each corner there is a tower-like rise. Each of these corner-towers represents one of the four seasons and the outside corner of each is aimed exactly in a cardinal direction.

=== Planetary Room ===
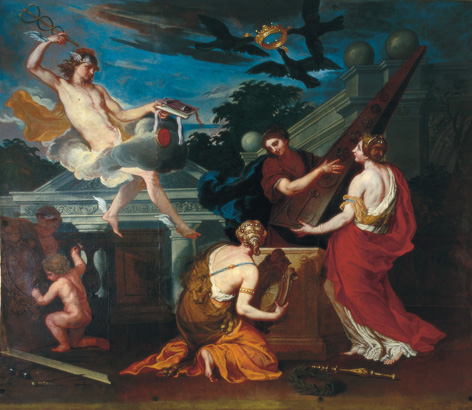
Painting of Mercury in the Planetary Room

The cycle of 24 state rooms culminates in the main festival hall, the Planetary Room and serves as both the beginning and the end of the ring of state rooms. The cycle of the oil paintings in this hall was created by Hans Adam Weissenkircher and displays the four elements, the 12 signs of the Western zodiac and of course the seven classical "planets" (planetes asteres: wandering stars) known to Antiquity. The cycle of paintings by Weissenkircher melds the architectural program with the ornamentation of the palace thereby achieving an allegory of the "Golden Age" ruled over by the House of Eggenberg.

=== Piano nobile ===
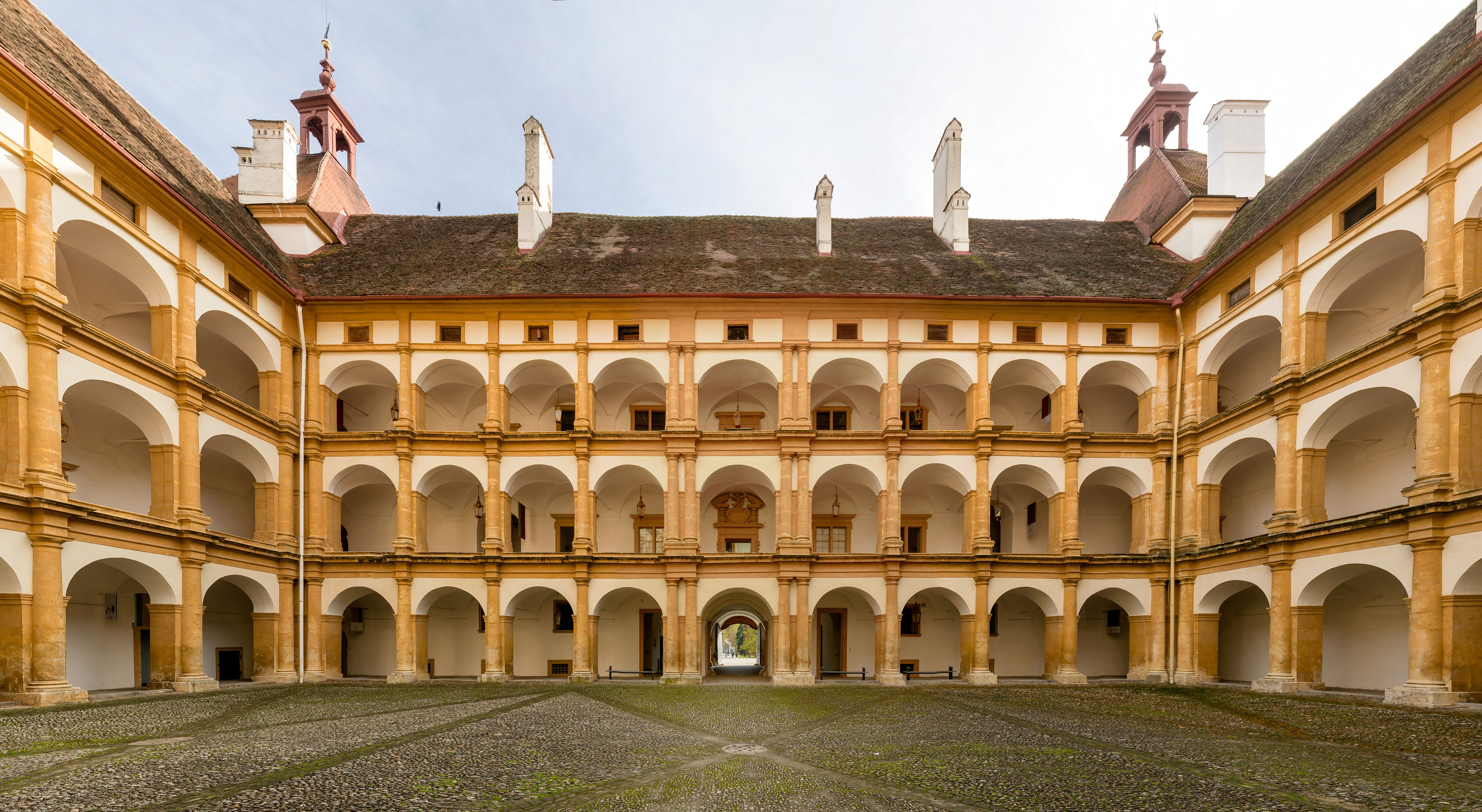
Central courtyard

The cycle of some 600 ceiling paintings in the 24 state rooms of the piano nobile recalls the history of the world with scenes from Greek and Roman mythology, religious scenes from the Old Testament, and historical legends from Western Europe. This ceiling program with its stucco framing dates back to the first period of accouterment in the 17th century.

Under the married couple Eggenberg-Herberstein, the 24 rooms of the piano nobile were refurbished according to the tastes of the Rococo starting in the mid-18th century. In addition to new pieces of furniture, chandeliers and sconces, and high-quality faïence stoves, nearly all the rooms also received brand-new, monochrome silk damask wall coverings. Five rooms in the north tract of the piano nobile were equipped with large painted canvasses. Styrian artist Johann Anton Baptist Raunacher dedicated each room to a different subject; shepherd's games, theatrical scenes and gambling scenes are found alongside society scenes and hunting scenes in Schloss Eggenberg. It was during this phase that the Eggenberg palace theater was converted into a palace church in the Baroque style. In addition, three exquisite East Asian cabinets were integrated into the sequence of rooms. The first two are adorned with valuable Imari porcelain plates and bowls as well as Chinese silk paintings. In the wall coverings of the third cabinet, eight panels of a precious Japanese folding screen have been used. These traditional dividers portray the palace and the fortified town of Osaka before 1615, whereby it can be determined that these panels were executed shortly thereafter. From the early modern era there are very few of these screens depicting the city before its destruction, so these works are especially noteworthy. On account of the viewpoint on Osaka the Eggenberg panels represent a unique exhibit.

The find of the screen created a sensation in Japan, since any visual remnants of the time of Hideyoshi were rare. During the state visit of the Austrian president in 2009 a memorandum of understanding was signed creating a partnership between Eggenberg and Osaka Castle.

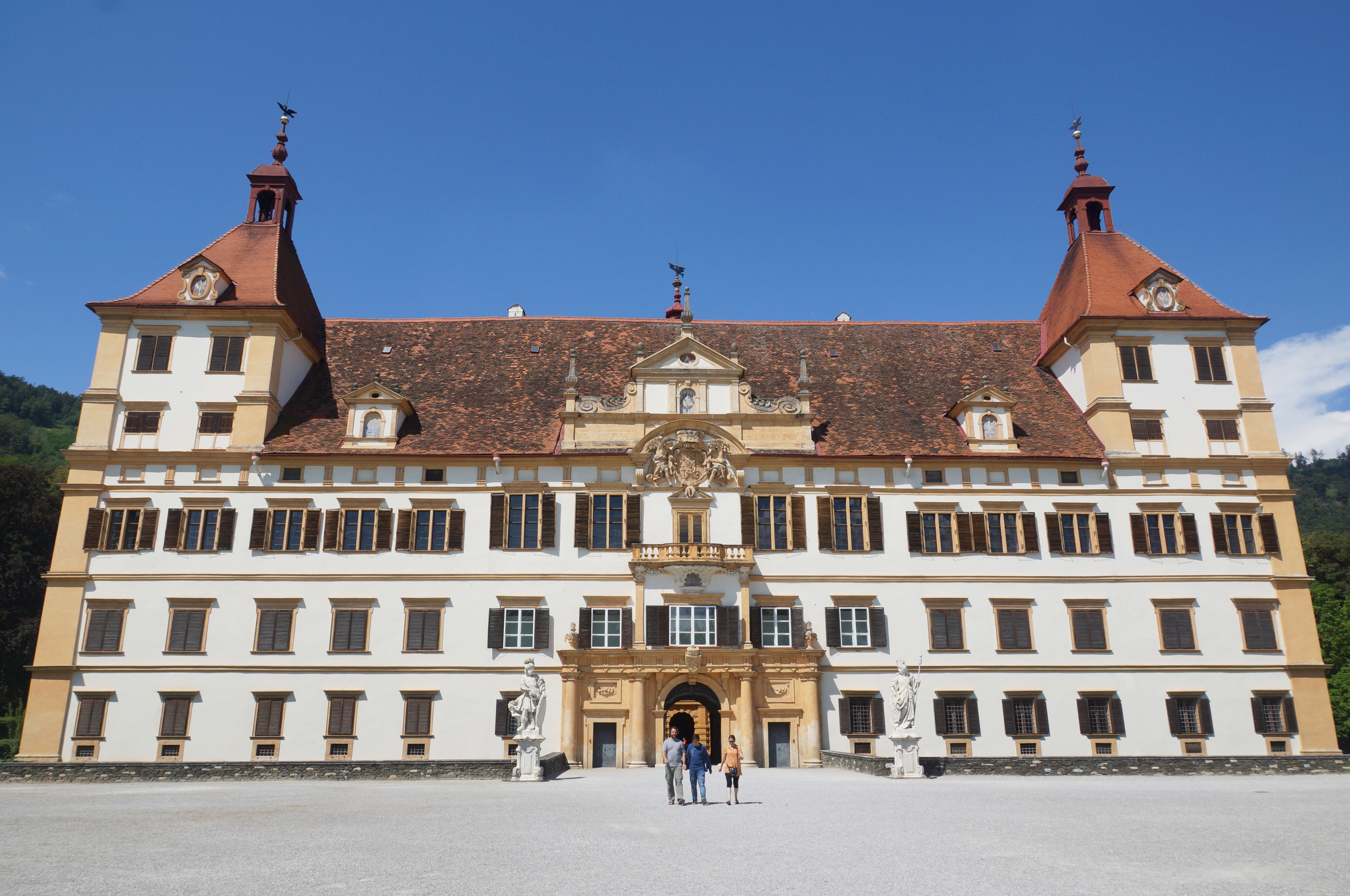
Main façade with entry portal

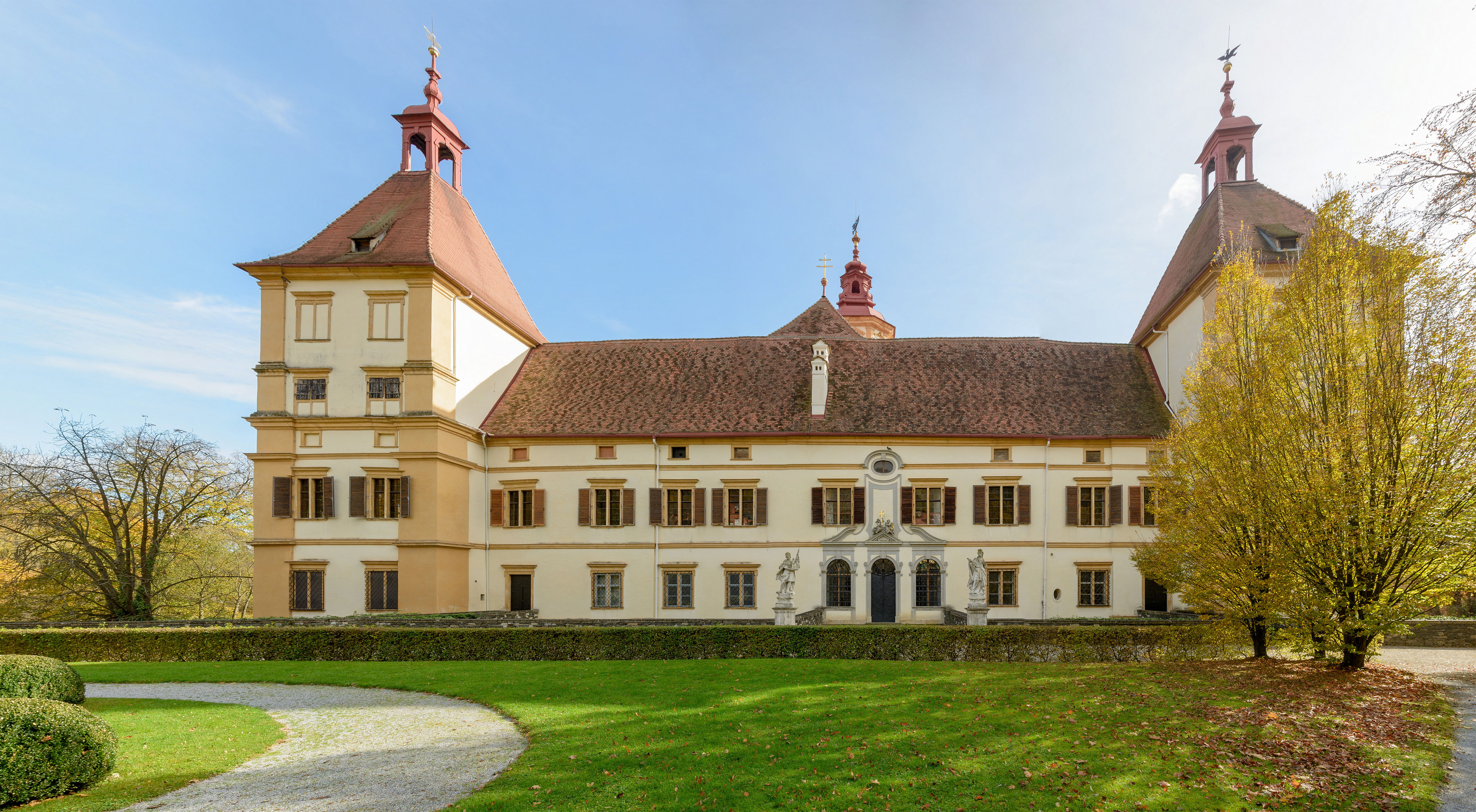
Garden side of the Palace

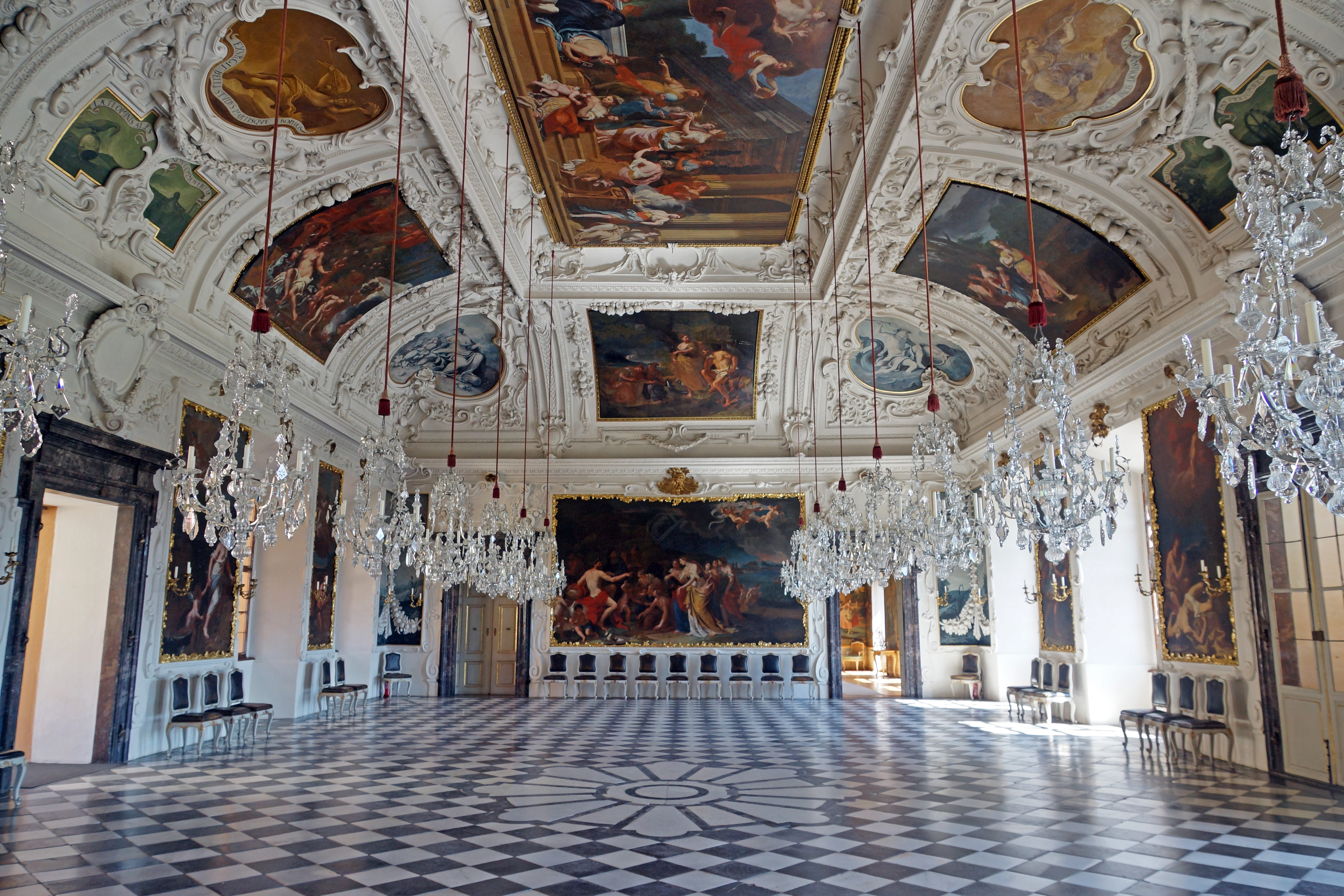
Planetary Room

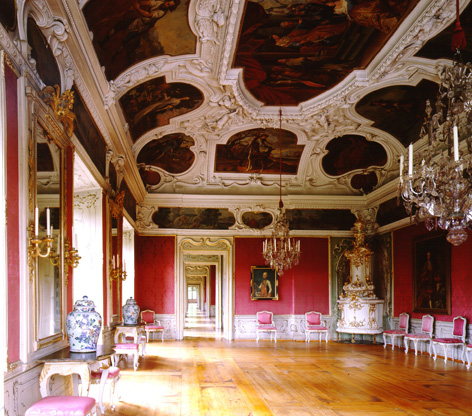
Piano Nobile

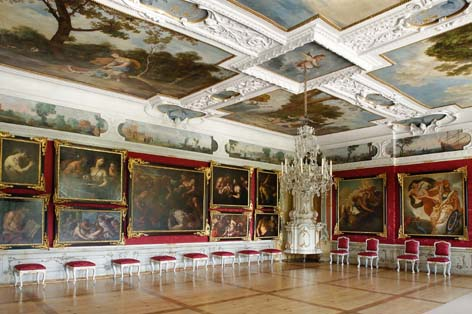
Gallery Room

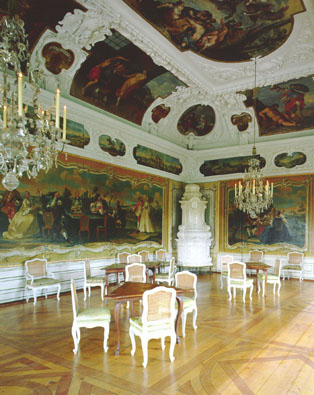
Gambling Room with wall coverings by J.A.B. Raunacher

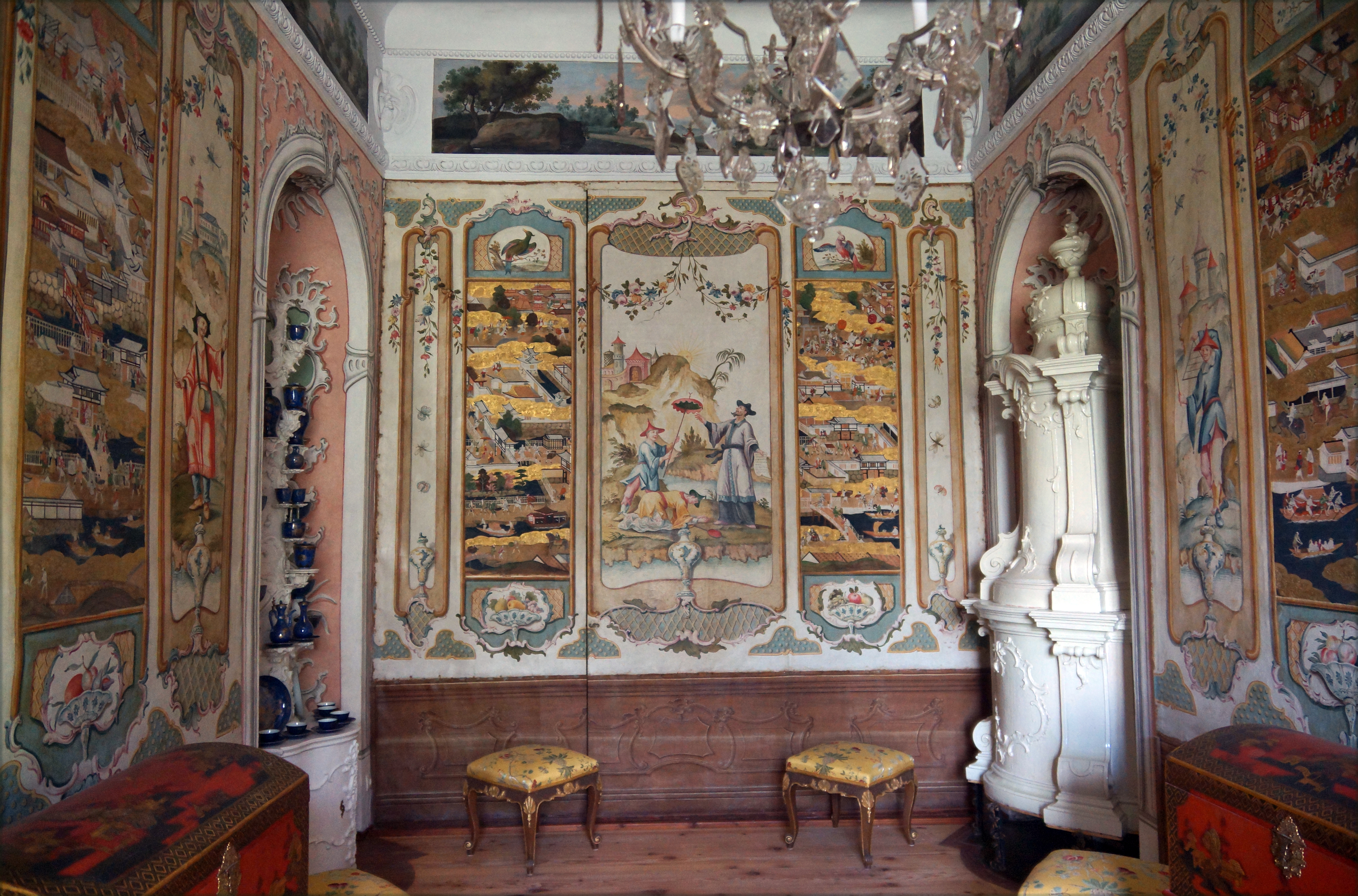
Japanese Cabinet with the rare screen depicting Osaka

== Gardens ==
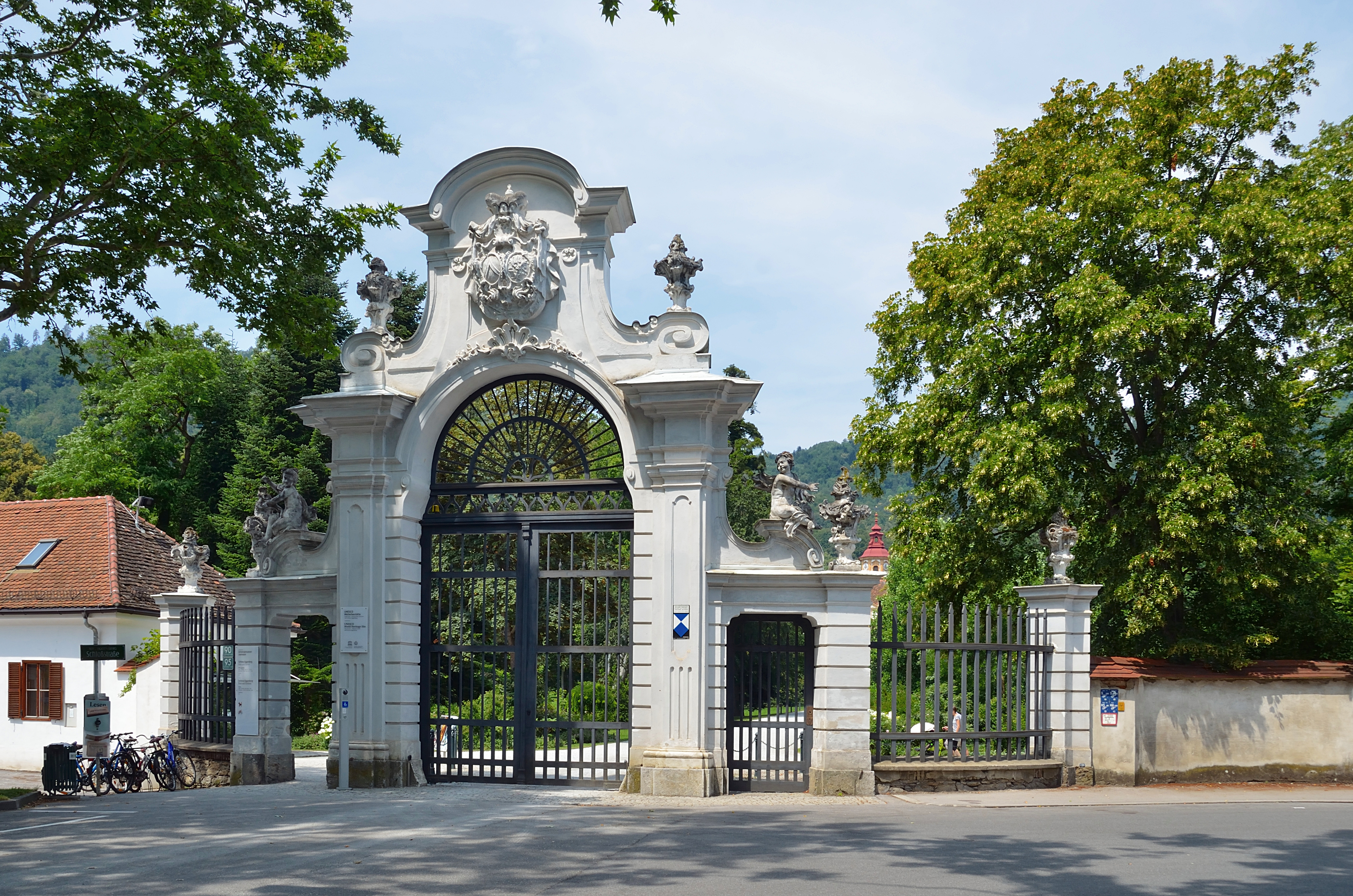
Entrance gate to the garden and palace

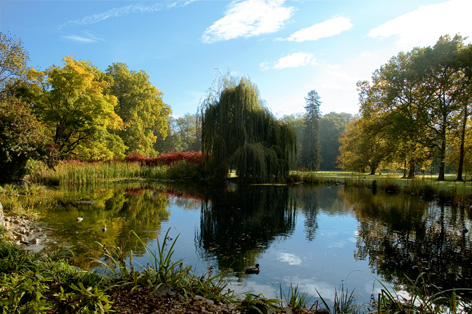
Water feature in the English garden

The various owners and builder-owners have always looked at the palace and at the surrounding gardens as corresponding elements. Thus, every succeeding generation has carried out significant alterations.

The largest expansion of the garden occurred after the completion of the house. In the last third of the 17th century the garden was generously extended around the building. It followed the pattern of the strictly subdivided Italian garden, with parterres, bosquet areas, fountains, aviaries and pheasant gardens.

Johann Leopold Count Herberstein allowed the whole arrangement to be reshaped into a French garden. As early as the 1770s, the Eggenberg Gardens were an attraction open to the Grazer public.

However, with the advent of the Enlightenment and the liberalization of ideas under Joseph II, Holy Roman Emperor, by the end of the 18th century, it was thought that Baroque gardens were ugly; having a pruned nature constricted by too stringent norms. Jérôme Count Herberstein, as a fanatical garden lover, partook of this perspective and in 1802 prompted the stylish transformation of the Eggenberg Schloss Park into a picturesque English garden. labyrinths, fountains, straight paths and hierarchical patterns all had to give way to the call to "return to nature" in the sense of Jean-Jacques Rousseau. Apart from the straight entrance way, which was preserved, the goal was to create artificial vistas with the new, winding pathways and the illusion of being in an Arcadian landscape painting such as those of Claude Lorrain whose works inspired the likes of Stourhead as well as many others. The recently restored Rose Mound formed the climax of this 19th-century landscape park.

The early 20th century saw a dwindling of interest in the palace gardens and the Eggenberg Schloss Park no longer employed a gardener. This had the unfortunate consequences of individual elements of the garden being torn-out and, over the course of decades, the rest being overgrown; the entire arrangement thus becoming more or less a simple city park.

In 1993, in cooperation with the Austrian Federal Bureau of Cultural Heritage Management (Bundesdenkmalamt), a garden grooming project was begun with the goals of preserving and reconstructing the gardens as a cultural monument to Romanticism. The still existing elements were to be made recognizable and protected and the lost elements reconstructed in so far as it was possible. The initial phases of this project that have already been completed are the reconstruction of the 1848 Breakfast Garden behind the palace and the reclamation and restoration, which occurred during the winter months of 2007/08, of the Rose Mound, one of the most important components of the romantic English landscape garden.

Additionally, the peacocks from the Graz Peacock Garden formerly located between the inner city and the city park have found a new home in the Eggenberg Schloss Park. The species are of both the white variety and the more common Indian blue peacock. During mating season, the loud cawing of the males as well as their brilliant plumage adds an exotic flair to the splendor of the park as they try to attract the larger but less colorful females.

=== Planetary Garden ===
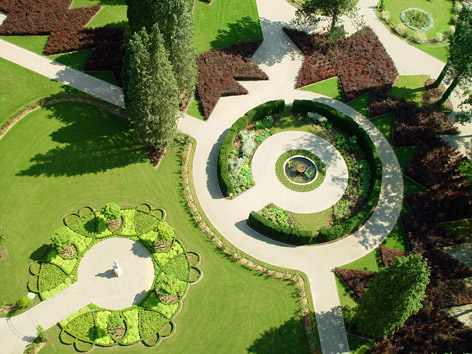
Planetary Garden aerial view

In the north corner of the grounds, an enclosed, separate garden went through such diverse transformations and uses over the course of the palace history that in the end it was discernible only by the spatial structure.

Due to a lack of surviving records, a new design for the flower garden was decided on in 2000 and a new garden grew out of an old idea. Landscape architect Helga Tornquist took up the theme of the Eggenberg scheme and incorporated it into a contemporary garden creation. This reclamation takes up in a playful fashion the ancient system of planetary "signatures", which is of special significance for the iconography of Schloss Eggenberg. The Lapidarium has been established over the foundations of the former orangery as a point of interest and to provide an appropriate setting for the Roman Stonework Collection of the Joanneum.

Schloss Eggenberg enters the 21st century with the opening of a newly constructed subterranean showroom adjoined to the Lapidarium to house the Joanneum's Pre- and Early History archaeological Collections in autumn of 2009 to be ready for the Joanneum's bicentennial celebration in 2011.

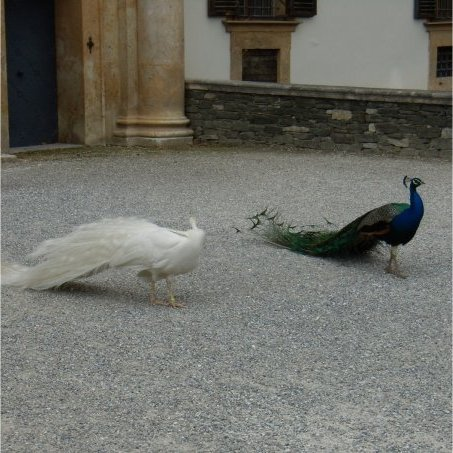
peacocks on the bridge

== Commemorative silver euro coin ==
In 2002, the Austrian Mint honored the importance of Schloss Eggenberg, by using it as the main motif of one of its most popular silver euro commemorative coins: the 10 euro Eggenberg Palace commemorative coin. The reverse side shows an image of Johannes Kepler, a personal acquaintance of Eggenberg's who taught at the former Protestant school in Graz. His first major work, Mysterium Cosmographicum describing the Copernican system, written while he was still in Graz, likely influenced the symbolism of the design of the palace.

== See also ==
- List of Baroque residences

== Sources ==
- Das Joanneum – Österreichs Universalmuseum [documentary film DVD] By Günther Schilhan (director) & Helmut Gesslbauer (producer), Austria: ORF Steiermark, 2006. (available through the Joanneum)
- Schloss Eggenberg. By Barbara Kaiser. Graz: Christian Brandstätter Verlag, 2006. ISBN 978-3-902510-80-8 (English Edition) or ISBN 978-3-902510-96-9 (German Edition) (available through the Joanneum)
- Planet Eggenberg. By Hermann Götz. Graz: Landesmuseum Joanneum / Leykam Medien AG, 2005.
- Ôsaka zu byôbu: Ein Stellschirm mit Ansichten der Burgstadt Ôsaka in Schloss Eggenberg. in Joannea Neu Folge, Band 1. By Franziska Ehmcke et al. Graz: Universalmuseum Joanneum, 2010. ISBN 978-3-902095-32-9 (available through the Joanneum)
- The Thirty Years War. By Cicely Veronica Wedgwood. Garden City, NY: Anchor Books, 1961. (Re-issued by NYRB Classics, 2005. ISBN 978-1-59017-146-2)
- Hans Ulrich Fürst von Eggenberg: Freund und erster Minister Kaiser Ferdinand II. By Hans von Zwiedineck-Südenhorst. Charleston, SC: BiblioBazaar, 2009. (new edition of digitally preserved original German text printed in Vienna in 1880, printed in Leipzig by Amazon Distribution GmbH) ISBN 978-1-113-02782-5
- Ein Staat in Alt-Österreich: Besitzungen der Eggenberger. By Franz Kammerhofer. Graz: Franz Kammerhofer, 1998. ISBN 978-3-9500808-1-0
- Die Fürsten und Freiherren zu Eggenberg und ihre Vorfahren. By Walther Ernest Heydendorff. Graz: Verlag Styria, 1965.
- Alte Galerie – Masterpieces. By Ulrich Becker et al. Graz: Landesmuseum Joanneum, 2005. (English edition) ISBN 978-3-7011-7533-8
- Der Eggenberger Altar. By Paul W. Roth et al. Vienna, Austria: Österreichische Galerie Belvedere, 2001.
- Schloss Eggenberg: Lernbehelf für Guides. By Barbara Kaiser. Graz: Landesmuseum Joanneum, 2001.
- Hans Adam Weissenkircher: Fürstlich Eggenbergischer Hofmaler. By Barbara Ruck. Graz: Landesmuseum Joanneum, 1985.
- Giovanni Pietro de Pomis. By Kurt Woisetschläger et al. Graz: Verlag Styria, 1974. ISBN 978-3-222-10847-1
