= Eggenberg family =

Austrian noble family from Styria

Arms of the Eggenberg family

The House of Eggenberg was the name of an influential Austrian noble family from Styria, who achieved princely rank in the 17th century. The family's last male heir died in 1717, bringing an end to the House of Eggenberg.

== History ==
The origin of the Austrian noble house of Eggenberg is shrouded in darkness. The Counter-Reformation with its struggles between the Catholic court of the Habsburgs and the Protestant nobility belongs to those moving times in which the destiny of some families changed abruptly. While old, Protestant-minded nobles lost power and their native lands, families loyal to the emperor were raised to new nobility and garnered great wealth. A good example of this is the meteoric rise of the Eggenberg family. They had become rich vintners in Radkersburg, and then expanded their operations to be financiers to the nobility and local lords loyal to the emperor.

=== Ascendancy of a merchant family ===
Ulrich Eggenberger († 1448) is the first documented member of the family; he was first mentioned in 1432 as a municipal judge in Graz, in the Duchy of Styria. His sons Hans and Balthasar then divided the family into two lines. Hans founded the Radkersburg (later Ehrenhausen) line and Balthasar was the patriarch of the main Graz line, which then also developed a branch in Augsburg.

Upon the death of Ulrich, Balthasar († 1493) inherited a stately property and successfully continued the commercial business and coin-minting operations. Under him, the business connections to the Habsburg imperial court also developed. Emperor Frederick III, for the most part residing in Graz, appointed him the mint master of Graz, Laibach (today Ljubljana) in the Duchy of Carniola, and Sankt Veit an der Glan in the Duchy of Carinthia. This close connection with the imperial house and Balthasar's economic talent led to a substantial increase of the Eggenberger wealth and fortunes. The 15th century was marked by warmongering discussions and threats by Hungarian and Ottoman Turk aspirations. In this time of political instability, Balthasar, in the way of a true businessman, plied both sides against the middle. Thus, he was also made director of the royal finance chamber of Hungarian king Matthias Corvinus, archrival of Frederick III. It is believed that this connection with the Hungarian king led to the noble appearance of the family coat of arms (three crowned ravens bearing a crown in their beaks) for the still middle-class family of merchants. Corvinus is Latin for raven and Corvinus' own coat of arms is a single raven bearing a ring in its beak. In 1463, through his accumulated wealth and influence, Balthasar acquired the property to the west of Graz which he developed into the family seat and forms the area on which Eggenberg Palace sits today. In 1470, the Gothic chapel dedicated to the Virgin Mary, constructed under Balthasar, was acknowledged in a Papal indulgence and still today forms the center of the baroque palace arrangement constructed under Balthasar's great-grandson Hans Ulrich von Eggenberg.

Descendants include the families of Eggenberger, Eggenberg, and Eggenhof, in whose coats-of-arms one sees the eponymous corvines of the Corvinus dynasty.

=== The Augsburg branch ===
A son of Balthasar's from his first marriage to Radegunde Seidennater († before 1480), Christoph Eggenberger († 1520), moved to Augsburg with his youngest sister, Radegund († after 1508) where business opportunities appeared more favorable and competition with children of Balthasar's second marriage to Barbara von Pain († 1518), who developed the main lineage in Graz, wouldn't be a factor. The Augsburg line died out in the 17th century.

=== The Ehrenhausen lineage ===
The House of Eggenberg remained one of the most significant patrician families of Styria till 17th century. Hans Eggenberger († 1481) a brother of Balthasar who remained in Radkersburg was the father of the Ehrenhausen line. His son, Ruprecht von Eggenberg († 1611), was not only a successful businessman but also an accomplished soldier. His military accomplishments in the fight against invasions by armies of the Ottoman Empire, among others, led to the elevation of the whole family into the Barons Estate providing the second, essential foundation-stone for the rise of others in the family. Ruprecht left his inheritance to his nephew Wolff von Eggenberg, another one of the rare Eggenbergs who opted for a military career, which cost him his right leg in battle with the Turks. The next generation saw the end of the male heirs to the Ehrenhausen line with the death of Franz Andrae to Sitzenberg in 1646.

=== The zenith of the main lineage in the 17th century ===
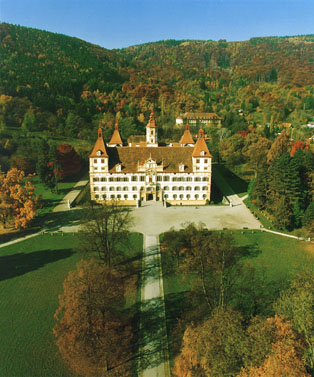
Schloss Eggenberg

Arms of Prince Johann Anton I of Eggenberg

It was the younger cousin of Ruprecht, Hans Ulrich von Eggenberg, from the main Graz line who brought the family to their ultimate prominence. Graz was the seat of power for the Habsburg archdukes of Inner Austria from 1564 to 1619. It was during this period that Hans Ulrich, having received a very good Protestant education at the Tübinger Stift, converted to Catholicism in order to serve his lord, Archduke Ferdinand. In 1619, at the onset of The Thirty Years War, Archduke Ferdinand was elected Ferdinand II, Holy Roman Emperor and, owing to his own faith and the strong influence of his devoted mother, Archduchess Maria Anna of Bavaria he prosecuted the Counter-Reformation in the Habsburg hereditary lands and the Holy Roman Empire which led to the Thirty Years War between Protestant and Catholic Princes in the Empire as well as the House of Habsburg and the House of Bourbon. Under the influence of Cardinal Richelieu and his anti-Habsburg policy, the Catholic French supported the Protestant, German Princes against the Emperor. Hans Ulrich helped steer Ferdinand II's policy. Hans Ulrich was awarded the Order of the Golden Fleece (an honor rare outside of the Habsburg Royal Family), appointed Governor of Inner Austria as well as First Minister of the Emperor, Duke of Krumlov and President of the Geheimrat. He was, with Richelieu, one of the most important and powerful statesmen and diplomats of 17th century in Europe. Due to both his service to the Emperor and his cunning business prowess, Eggenberg amassed a large fortune and, in addition to the family seat in Graz, extensive territorial holdings throughout the southern regions of the Habsburg hereditary lands from Český Krumlov to Ptuj. It was in 1625, as he was appointed to Governor of Inner Austria, while Ferdinand busied himself with the duties of imperial office in Vienna, that Hans Ulrich had the medieval family seat transformed into a lavish palace of the late Renaissance and early Baroque. Today, this palace, Schloss Eggenberg stands as a museum and UNESCO World Cultural Heritage Site owned by the State of Styria in Austria and managed by the Universalmuseum Joanneum.

The only son of Hans Ulrich, Johann Anton I von Eggenberg, Holy Roman Prince (1610–1649) enjoyed his education at, among others, the Jesuit University in Graz. In the end, after an extensive gentleman's tour of the whole of Europe he returned to Graz in 1632. At this time he exerted his efforts in a broad renovation of Schloss Eggenberg. Nevertheless, his preferential residences were the Palais Eggenberg on the Sackstrasse in the Graz Old Town (now Palais Herberstein and home of the Joanneum's Museum im Palais) and the residence in Český Krumlov. He also entered into the service of the imperial court and proved himself under Emperor Ferdinand III. An important goal for Johann Anton I was the acquisition of the Imperial Estate, which had amazingly eluded his father, Hans Ulrich. However, in 1647, the emperor granted him the possibility to buy the princely shire of Görz with the town Aquileia as well as a few other localities. With these acquisitions the Eggenbergs were prosperous not only in Habsburg hereditary lands but also within the Holy Roman Empire. Thus, the Eggenbergs now had the right to a seat in the Imperial Diet.

=== Decline of a dynasty ===
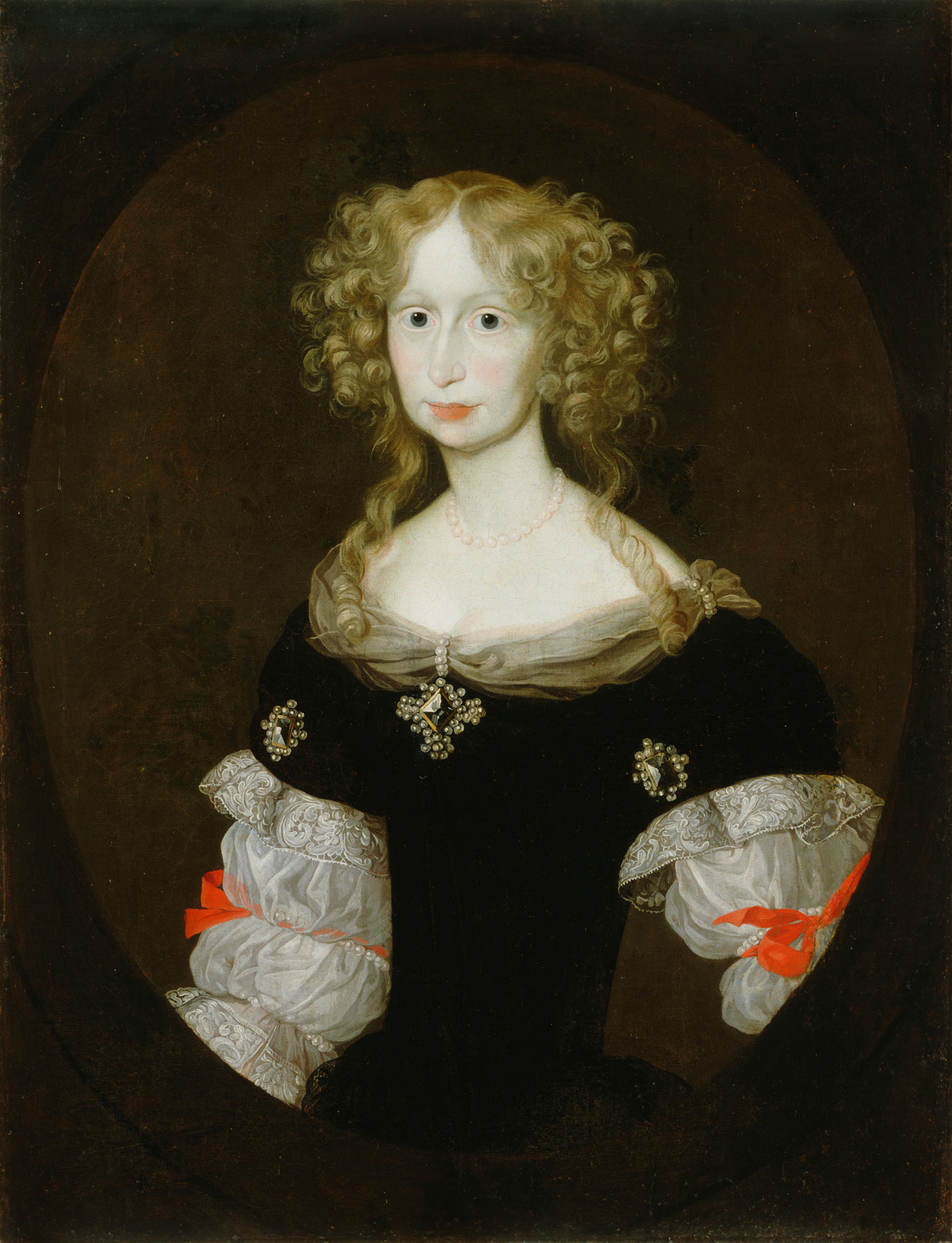
Portrait of Princess Eleonora Maria Rosalia of Eggenberg, née Princess of Liechtenstein (1647-1703)

After the unexpected death of Johann Anton I and on account of the absence of a valid last will, division of the Eggenberg holdings led to conflict among his two sons, Johann Christian and Johann Seyfried. They agreed on an equivalent division of the inheritance. Johann Christian received the Bohemian possessions and Johann Seyfried decided on the Inner Austrian possessions. The most serious disagreement arose over the fate of Gradisca, because, the seat in the Imperial Diet was tied to this possession. The quarrel would last until 1672, when they could finally agree on a new contract of inheritance. The division of properties remained as it was with Johann Seyfried receiving a larger capital. Johann Christian meanwhile would administer Gradisca, however, he would do so in the name of both brothers.

Johann Seyfried focused his primary attention on the splendid arrangement of the Inner Austrian possessions awarded to him, above all, the completion of the accouterments of the Graz residence. Under his regency Schloss Eggenberg received its first magnificent accouterments and the first garden was established. Most probably Johann Seyfried's most important task was to provide his residence as host for the imperial bride of Emperor Leopold I in 1673. During the course of the only imperial wedding to be held in Graz, future Empress, Archduchess Claudia Felicitas of Tyrol resided in the new family residence of the Eggenbergs. Johann Seyfried spared no expense for either his princely patronage or the imperial visit. While his brother, Johann Christian, knew how to increase his wealth with the typical Eggenberg cunning, Johann Seyfried did not seem to have inherited the economic talent of his family. Within a few decades he brought himself to almost complete ruin. Only by the sales of most of his various possessions and by the narrow connections with the imperial house was he able to escape his misfortune time and again. After the death of Johann Christian, Johann Seyfried received the income from the Bohemian possessions as the sole heir of the House of Eggenberg at which time his financial position was again comfortable.

After the death Johann Seyfried in 1713 the continuance of the House of Eggenberg was thought to still be secured through male descendants. However, in 1716 his ailing son, Johann Anton II died at the age of 47. Only one year later his only son, the last Prince of Eggenberg, Johann Christian II, died at the age of 13 due to a severe case of appendicitis. Johann Seyfried's brother, Johann Christian in Krumau, left no heirs upon his death in 1710 and in his will stipulated that the profitable Bohemian possessions pass to the nephew of his widow, Adam II Franz Karl a Prince of Schwarzenberg. Thus with the death of Johann Christian II in 1717, the House of Eggenberg's male heritage came to an end.

Subsequently, the decay of the vast Eggenberg possessions began. One of the two sisters of Johann Christian II, Maria Eleonore, Imperial Princess to Eggenberg, married her third husband, Johann Leopold Count Herberstein. Her spouse was named her sole heir upon her death without issue in 1774. The Styrian possessions, which included Schloss Eggenberg in Graz, thereby passed to a branch of the Herberstein family. Other possessions were sold to pay off debt and Gradisca, which could not be passed to a female heir, was taken out of Eggenberg possession. Thus by 1774 the arguably most famous noble dynasty of Styria had become extinct.

=== Coat of arms ===
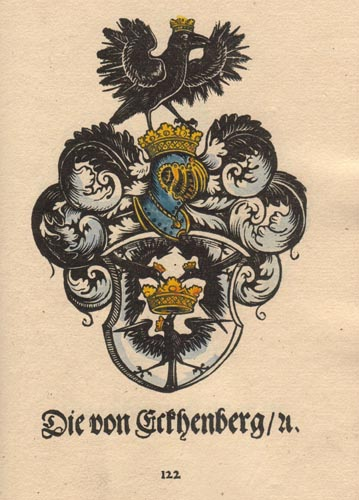
Eggenberg coat of arms

Blazon: In the middle of a silver field a golden helmet-crown, trefoil shaped, accompanied by three golden-crowned, black-highlighted, red-tongued ravens, in the posture of a normal heraldic eagle each with head to crown. On the crowned helmet with black-silver coverings a golden-crowned, black-highlighted and red-tongued raven, flying up, already in the posture of a spread-eagle.

It is thought that the coat of arms, which is found already on the tombstone of Balthasar Eggenberger, was granted sometime after 1479 through his relationship with Mathias Corvinus, King of Hungary. What is unusual is the prominent use of this coat of arms on the grave of a middle-class merchant citizen whose family would not achieve noble status until the next generation.

== Notable family members ==
1. Christoph von Eggenberg to Ehrenhausen († 1553)
2. Helena von Eggenberg to Ehrenhausen († vor 1568), born von Fieger, wife of 1st
3. Hans Christoph von Eggenberg to Ehrenhausen († 1581), son of 1st
4. Maria von Eggenberg to Ehrenhausen, born Galler, wife of 3rd
5. Bartholomaeus von Eggenberg to Ehrenhausen († 1583), son of 1st
6. Justina von Eggenberg, born von Breuner, wife of 5th
7. Freiherr Ruprecht von Eggenberg to Ehrenhausen († 1611), Field Colonel General of the Artillery
8. Freiherr Wolff von Eggenberg to Ehrenhausen († 1615), Colonel General and nephew of 7th
9. Fürst Hans Ulrich von Eggenberg (†1634), President of the Geheimrat of Ferdinand II, Holy Roman Emperor
10. Fürst Johann Anton (I) († 1649), son of 9th, first Eggenberg in the Imperial Diet
11. Fürstin Anna Maria von Eggenberg, née Brandenburg-Bayreuth († 1680), wife of 10th
12. Fürst Johann Christian (I) von Eggenberg († 1710), first son of 10th & 11th
13. Fürst Johann Seyfried von Eggenberg († 1713), second son of 10th & 11th
14. Fürstin Maria Charlotte von Eggenberg († 1755), wife of the last prince of Eggenberg
15. Fürstin Maria Theresia von Eggenberg († 1774), daughter of 13th, married as the Countess of Leslie

== Fürsten (Princes) of Eggenberg ==
- Hans Ulrich von Eggenberg (1568–1634), 1598 - Baron, 1623 - Prince of Eggenberg, 1628 - Duke of Krumlov; ∞ Baroness Maria Sidonia von Thannhausen, daughter of the Baron Konrad von Thannhausen and Dorothea von Teuffenbach
- Johann Anton I (1610–1649), son of Hans Ulrich, Prince of Eggenberg, Duke of Krumlov, Princely Count of Gradisca; ∞ Margravine Anna Maria von Eggenberg, née Brandenburg-Bayreuth, daughter of Margrave Christian von Brandenburg-Bayreuth
- Johann Christian I (1641–1710), son of Johann Anton I, Prince of Eggenberg ∞ Princess Maria Ernestina to Schwarzenberg, daughter of Prince Johann Adolf I, Prince of Schwarzenberg
- Johann Seyfried (1644–1713), brother of Johann Christian I, Prince of Eggenberg; ∞ 1st Maria Eleonore Rosalia, Princess of Liechtenstein; ∞ 2nd Maria Josepha Antonia, Countess of Orsini-Rosenberg
- Johann Anton II Josef (1669–1716), nephew of Johann Christian I, Prince of Eggenberg; ∞ Countess Maria Karolina of Sternberg, daughter of Oldřich Adolf Vratislav, Count of Sternberg 1661,

......

== See also ==
- Eggenberg's golden carriage

== Sources ==
- Schloss Eggenberg. By Barbara Kaiser. Graz: Christian Brandstätter Verlag, 2006. ISBN 3-902510-80-3 (English Edition) or ISBN 3-902510-96-X (German Edition)
- Hans Ulrich Fürst von Eggenberg: Freund und erster Minister Kaiser Ferdinand II. By Hans von Zwiedineck-Südenhorst. Charleston, SC: BiblioBazaar, 2009. (new edition of digitally preserved original German text printed in Vienna in 1880, printed in Leipzig by Amazon Distribution GmbH) ISBN 1-113-02782-7
- Ein Staat in Alt-Österreich: Besitzungen der Eggenberger. By Franz Kammerhofer. Graz: Franz Kammerhofer, 1998. ISBN 3-9500808-1-3
- Die Fürsten und Freiherren zu Eggenberg und ihre Vorfahren. By Walther Ernest Heydendorff. Graz: Verlag Styria, 1965.
- Schloss Eggenberg: Lernbehelf für Guides. By Barbara Kaiser. Graz: Landesmuseum Joanneum, 2001.
- Inaugural-Dissertation. Die Fürsten zu Eggenberg. By Gerhard Bernd Marauschek. Graz: 1968. (dissertation available at the university library of Karl-Franzens University in Graz)
- Eggenberg. By Franz von Krones. In: Allgemeine Deutsche Biographie (ADB). Volume 5. Leipzig: Duncker & Humblot, 1877.
- ŽUPANIČ, Jan; STELLNER, František; FIALA, Michal. Encyklopedie knížecích rodů zemí Koruny české. Praha : Aleš Skřivan ml., 2001. 340 s. ISBN 80-86493-00-8.
- "I Principi di Eggenberg sovrani di Gradisca 1647–1717" (Comune di Gradisca d'Isonzo – Assessorato alla Cultura)
- M. Masau Dan – "Fortezza di Gradisca" (Consorzio per la salvaguardia dei castelli storici del Friuli-Venezia Giulia)
