= Four last things =

Stages of the soul in Christian theology

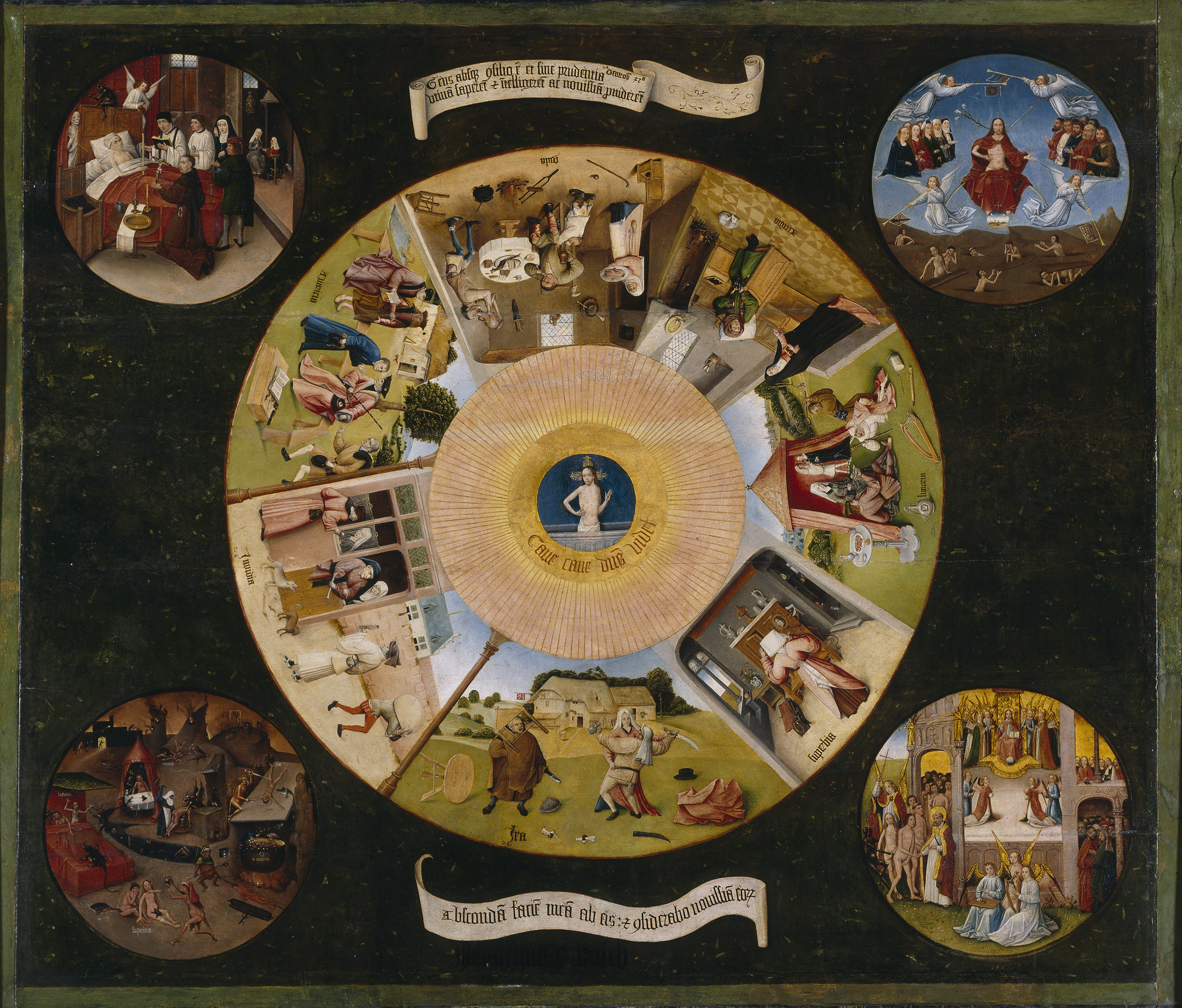
Hieronymus Bosch's 1500 painting The Seven Deadly Sins and the Four Last Things. The four outer discs depict (clockwise from top left) Death, Judgment, Heaven, and Hell.

In Christian eschatology, the Four Last Things (Latin: quattuor novissima) are Death, Judgment, Heaven, and Hell, the four last stages of the soul in life and the afterlife. They are often commended as a topic for pious meditation; Saint Philip Neri wrote, "Beginners in religion ought to exercise themselves principally in meditation on the Four Last Things". Traditionally, the sermons preached on the four Sundays of Advent were on the Four Last Things, although this connection has been largely lost in recent decades.

The 1909 Catholic Encyclopedia states "The eschatological summary which speaks of the 'four last things' (death, judgment, heaven, and hell) is popular rather than scientific. For systematic treatment it is best to distinguish between (A) individual and (B) universal and cosmic eschatology, including under (A): (1) death; (2) the particular judgment; (3) heaven, or eternal happiness; (4) purgatory, or the intermediate state; (5) hell, or eternal punishment; and under (B): (6) the approach of the end of the world; (7) the resurrection of the body; (8) the general judgment; and (9) the final consummation of all things." Pope John Paul II wrote in 1984 that the "judgment" component encompasses both particular judgment and general judgment.

== Books ==
Numerous theologians and Christian apologists have written on the Four Last Things; published accounts include:

=== 16th century and earlier ===
- Cordiale quattuor novissimorum (15th century) attributed to Gerardus de Vliederhoven and to Denis le Chartreux; translated into French by Jean Miélot and thence into English as Cordiale, or Four Last Things by Anthony Woodville, 2nd Earl Rivers in 1479
- The Four Last Things (1522) by Thomas More; unfinished (published posthumously).

=== 17th century ===
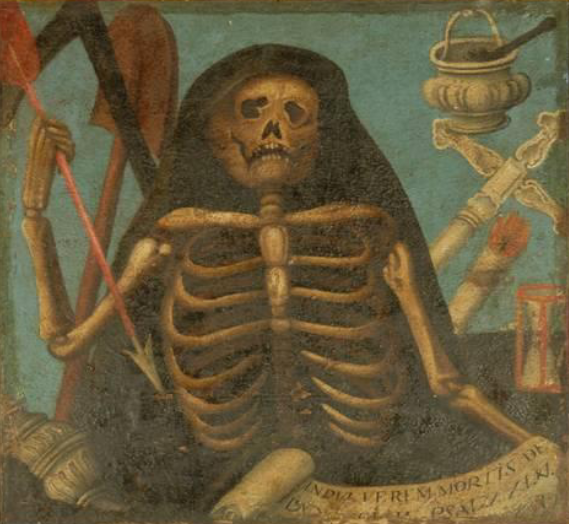
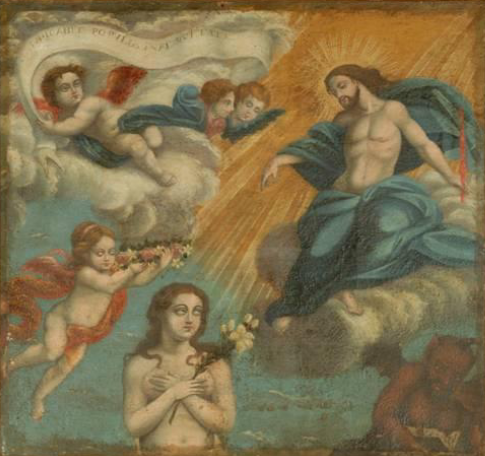
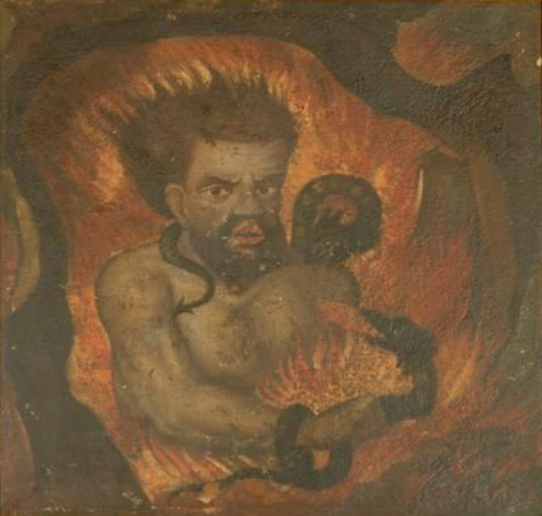
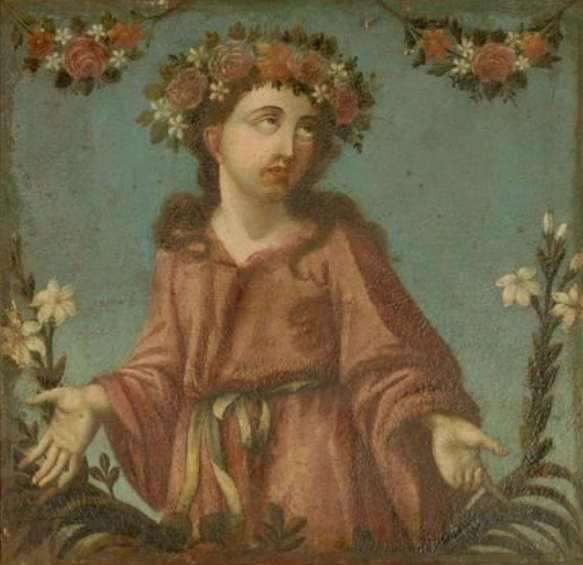
The Four Last Things in a 1793 series of paintings by Portuguese Brazilian artist José Gervásio de Sousa Lobo, in Ouro Preto, Minas Gerais, Brazil; clockwise from top left: Death, Judgment, Heaven, and Hell.
- The Four Last Things: Death, Judgment, Hell, and Heaven (1631) by Robert Bolton; published posthumously in 1639
- The four last things: death, judgment, hell, heaven by Martin of Cochem
- Four Last Things (1649) by William Sheppard, whose preface supported the Rump Parliament against the Presbyterians
- Sinnliche Beschreibung der vier letzten Dinge ("A Sensuous Representation of the Four Last Things") (1675) by Angelus Silesius
- Four Last Things–Death, Judgment, Heaven, and Hell (1691) by William Bates

=== 18th century ===
- Myfyrdodau bucheddol ar y pedwar peth diweddaf ("Devout musings on the four last things") (1714) by John Morgan
- Thoughts upon the Four Last Things (1734) by Joseph Trapp
- Four discourses on the four last things (1751) by Thomas Greene

=== 20th century ===
- The Four Last Things (1960) by Harry Williams
- L'eternelle vie et la profondeur de l'ame (1947) by Reginald Garrigou-Lagrange. Published in English as Life Everlasting: A Theological Treatise on the Four Last Things: Death, Judgement, Heaven, Hell
- The Last Things: Concerning Death, Purification After Death, Resurrection, Judgment, and Eternity (1965) by Romano Guardini

A Catholic sermon on the Four Last Things features in James Joyce's novel A Portrait of the Artist as a Young Man (1916); a "hellfire" sermon in the Protestant revivalist tradition appears in Stella Gibbons's Cold Comfort Farm (1932).

== The four last things ==
=== Death ===
Martin of Cochem explains that "there are three principal reasons why all sensible people fear death so much: First, because the love of life, the dread of death is inherent in human nature. Secondly, because every rational being is well aware that death is bitter, and the separation of soul and body cannot take place without inexpressible suffering. Thirdly, because no one knows whither he will go after death, or how he will stand in the Day of Judgment."

Or as Alphonsus Liguori wrote in his meditations: "We must die: how awful is the decree! We must die. The sentence is passed: It is appointed for all men once to die. Heb. 9:27"

=== The Last Judgment ===
Of the final judgment, Alphonsus Liguori writes that, "the last day is called in Scripture a day of wrath and misery; and such it will be for all those unhappy beings who shall have died in mortal sin; for on that day their most secret crimes will be made manifest to the whole world, and themselves separated from the company of the saints, and condemned to the eternal prison of hell, where they will suffer all the agonies of ever dying yet always remaining alive."

=== Heaven ===
Of heaven, Richard Challoner in his famous work Think Well On't writes, " Consider, that if God's justice is so terrible in regard to his enemies, how much more will his mercy, his goodness, his bounty declare itself in favour of his friends! Mercy and goodness are his favourite attributes, in which he most delights: his tender mercies says the royal prophet, Ps. 144. are over all his works.

=== Hell ===
Luis de la Puente writes concerning The nature of hell: "Hell is a perpetual prison, full of fire and of innumerable and very terrible torments, to chastise perpetually such as die in mortal sin. Or, again, hell is an eternal state, wherein sinners, for the punishment of their sins, want all that good which they may desire for their content, and endure all kinds of evils which they may fear for their torment. So that in hell is joined together the privation of all that good which men enjoy in this life and angels in the other, and the presence of all those evils which afflict men in this life and the devils in the other."

== Artworks ==
The Four Last Things are a common theme of artistic and literary works as well as theological works.

Works about the Four Last Things
Work	Type	Creator	Year	Notes	Refs
The Seven Deadly Sins and the Four Last Things	Painting	Hieronymus Bosch	c.1500		
Christ painting the Four Last Things in the Christian Heart	Engraving	Anton Wierix	1585	One of 18 copperplate engravings published as Cor Iesu amanti sacrum	
"One Thing is Needful, or Serious Meditations upon the Four Last Things"	Poem	John Bunyan	1683		
The Four Last Things (German: Die vier letzten Dinge)	Sculpture	Anton Neu, based on ideas from the Asam brothers	1751	Stucco cartouches in the vestibule of Weltenburg Abbey chapel	
The Four Last Things	Sculpture	Josef Stammel	c.1760	In Admont Abbey	
Novissima (Portuguese: Novíssimos)	Paintings	José Gervásio de Sousa Lobo	1792–3	Originally made for the sacristy of the Church of Our Lady of the Rosary of the Black Men in Ouro Preto; currently in the Minor Basilica of Our Lady of the Pillar in the same city.	
Die vier letzten Dinge	Oratorio	Joseph Leopold Eybler	1810		
Die letzten Dinge	Oratorio	Louis Spohr	1826		
Cantata of the Last Things of Man	Cantata	Ladislav Vycpálek	1920–22	Czech title Kantáta o posledních věcech člověka	
The Four Last Things	Poetry collection	Madeleva Wolff	1959	Poems with theological themes	
No. 18 (unfinished)	Film	Harry Everett Smith	1990s	Intended as his masterwork	
"Die vier letzten Dinge (Quasi una Sinfonia da Requiem)"	Symphony	Horst Lohse	1996–97	For organ and orchestra	
