= Admont Abbey Library =

Library in Admont, Austria

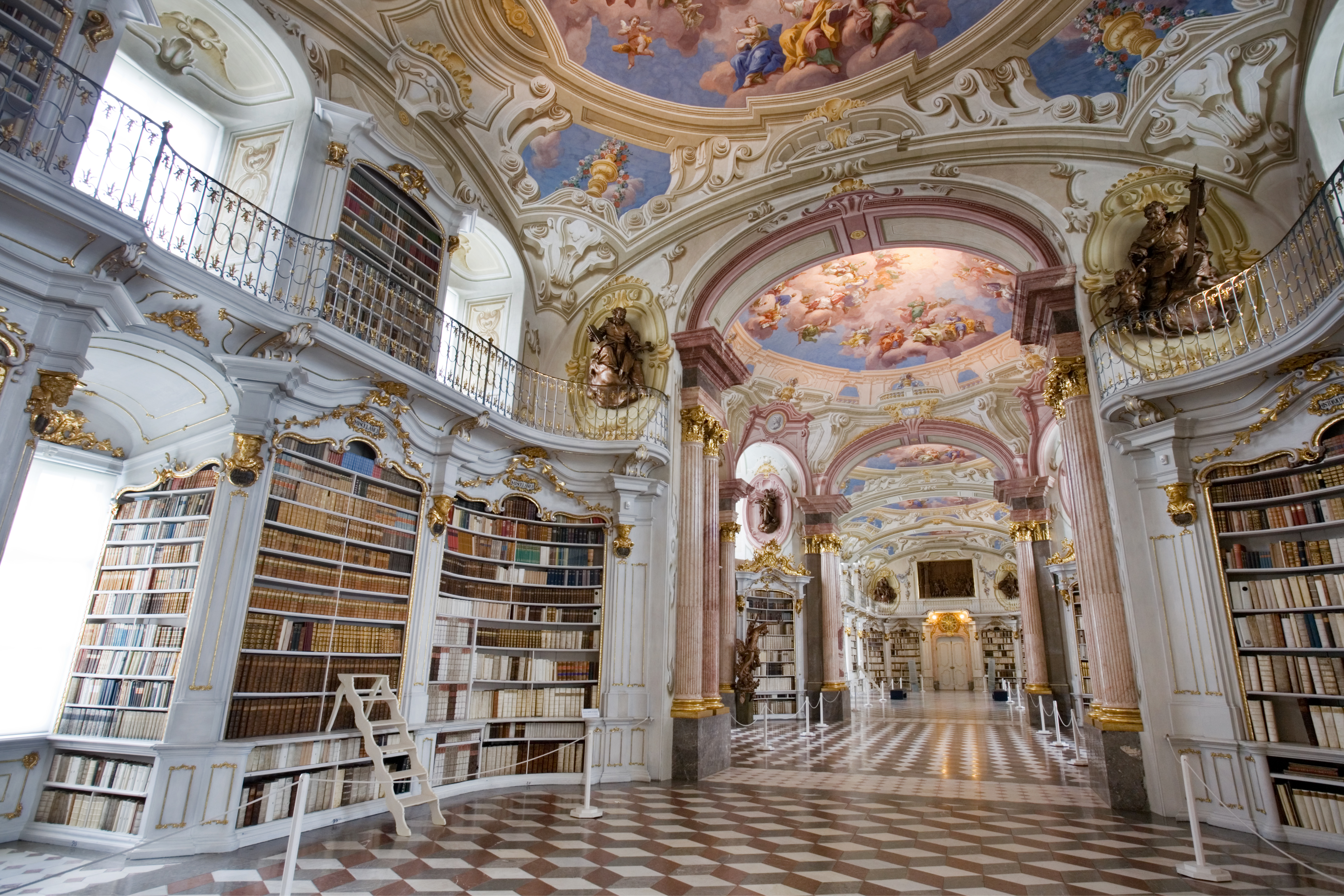
- 47.5759°N 14.4624°E
- Location: Admont, Austria
- Type: Baroque-style library
- Established: 1776
- Architect: Josef Hueber

Other information
- Website: www.stiftadmont.at

The Admont Abbey Library (Deutsch: Stiftsbibliothek Admont) is a monastic library located in Admont, a small town next to the Enns River in Styria, Austria, and is attached to the Admont Abbey.

Admont Abbey Library is the largest monastic library in the world, and is noted for its Baroque art, architecture and manuscripts.

== History ==
Admont Abbey Library, modelled on the Imperial Court Library in Vienna, was designed by Josef Hueber, for the abbey which was founded by Archbishop Gebhard of Salzburg. Construction of the library began in 1774 and was completed in 1776. The library holds in the region of 200,000 books.

The abbey made a deliberate decision to focus on the library as an online attention-grabber in 2018, launching a publicity strategy on multiple platforms. Its followers on Facebook increased from 4,500 in 2018 to 160,000 in 2022; in the same period, ticket sales for entry rose from ten thousand to sixty thousand.
