= Joseph Hueber =

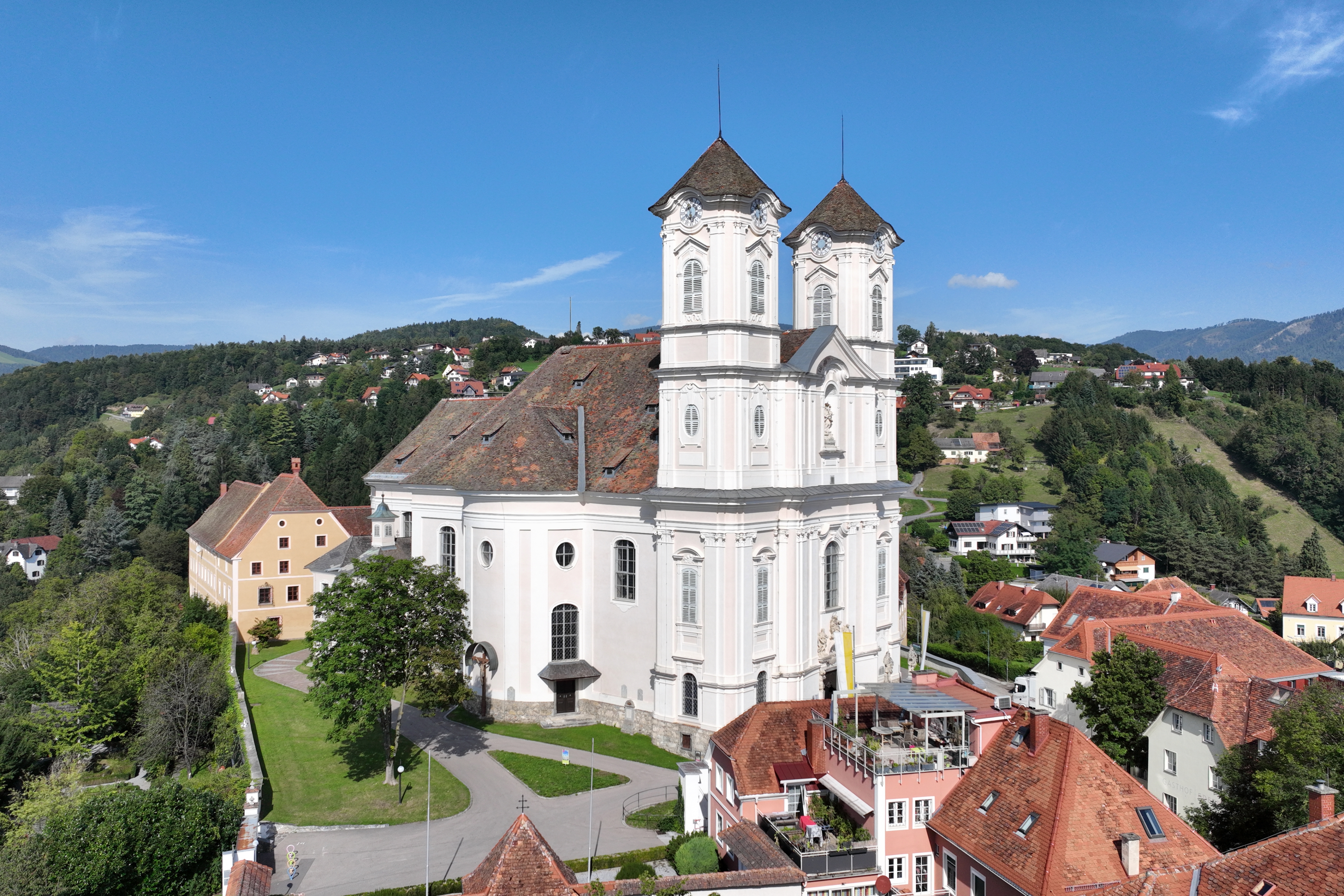
- Weizberg Church in Weiz, Styria, Austria
- Born: 1715 or 1717; Vienna, Austria
- Died: September 26, 1787; Graz, Styria, Austria
- Occupation: Architect
- Buildings: Admont Abbey Library, Schloss Eggenberg Pavilion, Herberstein City Palace (Graz)
- Projects: two tower façade of the Mariahilferkirche, Graz, conversion to Baroque style of Bistrica Castle in Slovenska Bistrica, Slovenia

Joseph Hueber (1715 or 1717–1787) was a significant Austrian baroque master builder who studied under Johann Lukas von Hildebrandt.

== Buildings & Projects ==
Among his most notable achievements are the Parish Church of Our Lady on the Weizberg in the Styrian town of Weiz and the Pilgrimage Church of St. Veit in Sankt Veit am Vogau. His most significant work is the famous library at the Admont Abbey. He also supervised the construction of a baroque pavilion for the park at Schloss Eggenberg in the Styrian capital of Graz as well as the conversion of the Schloss Eggenberg theater into a baroque palace chapel, Our Lady of the Snows.

== Literature ==
- "Der Barockbaumeister Joseph Hueber". in: Bilder aus Vergangenheit und Gegenwart. Beiträge zur Kultur- und Wirtschaftsgeschichte. (Weiz - Geschichte und Landschaft in Einzeldarstellungen. Hrsg. v. Leopold Farnleitner. 5), Weiz 1958, p.40–44.
