= Josef Stammel =

Austrian sculptor in the Baroque style

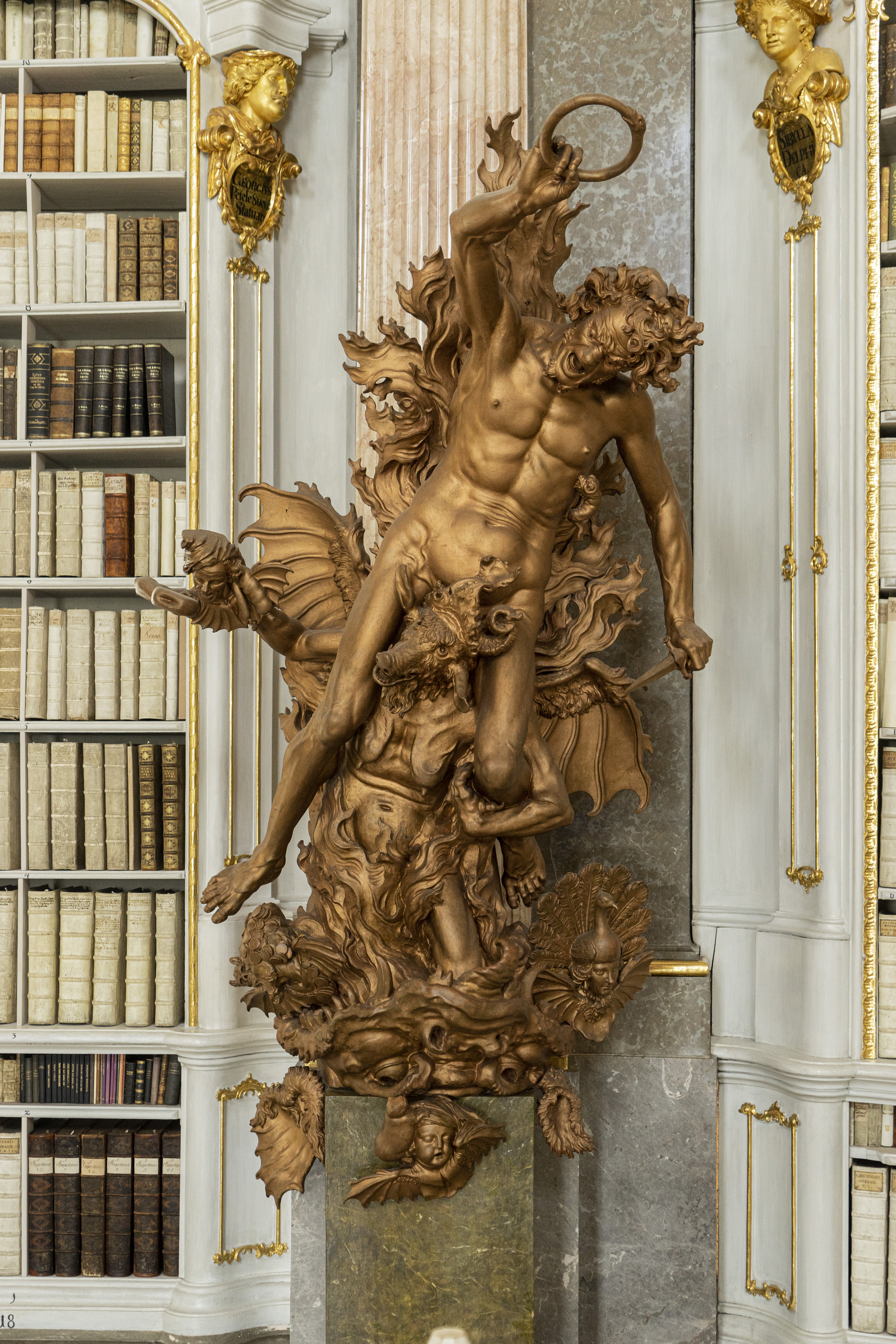
Hell; one of the "Four Last Things" at the Abbey Library, Admont

Josef Anton Stammel or, in some sources, Josef Thaddäus Stammel (baptized 9 September 1695, Graz - 21 December 1765, Admont) was an Austrian sculptor in the Baroque style who was born and died in the Duchy of Styria.

== Life and work ==
He was the third of six children born to the Bavarian sculptor, Johann Georg Stämbl (c. 1660-1707), and his wife Katharina; daughter of the court sculptor at Eggenberg Palace, Andreas Marx (died 1701). Little is known of his early life. The sculptors Johann Zeilinger (or Zeiringer) and Johann Jacob Schoy have been named as possible teachers. Between 1718 and 1725, he is known to have been taking a study trip throughout Italy. After 1726, he worked almost exclusively for the Benedictines at Admont Abbey and its parishes.

His work was a combination of two styles; Alpine, showing the influence of Thomas Schwanthaler and Meinrad Guggenbichler, and Italian, with influences that can be traced to Gianlorenzo Bernini and Giuseppe Maria Mazza. He was also an admirer of the works of Albrecht Dürer. The only fully-documented influence on him came from the painter and engraver, Gottfried Bernhard Göz, who also worked at the Abbey and provided the sketches for some of Stammel's sculptures.

He used wood, as well as stone, often modelled in wax, and his figures are noted for their strong emotional expressions. Groups of figures are often theatrically staged.

Although "Thaddäus" is sometimes given as his middle name, it was apparently a nickname of unknown origin. It first appeared in 1834, in a work by Ignaz Kollmann (1775-1837), a poet and novelist who also wrote art criticism.

== Sources ==
- Regina Ahlgrimm-Siess, Winfried Schwab (2003). "Stammel (Stämbl, Stämel, Stäml, Stämmel), Josef Anton". In Bautz, Traugott (ed.). Biographisch-Bibliographisches Kirchenlexikon (BBKL) (in German). Vol. 22. Nordhausen: Bautz. cols. 1265–1274. ISBN 3-88309-133-2.
- Michael Braunsteiner (Ed.): "Famosus statuarius Josef Stammel. 1695–1765. Barockbildhauer im Auftrag des Benediktinerstiftes Admont", Schriften zur Kunst- und Kulturgeschichte des Benediktinerstiftes Admont, Vol.1, Benediktinerstift, Admont 1996.
- Michael Braunsteiner (Ed.): "Barockbildhauer Josef Stammel. 1695–1765. Spurensuche", Schriften zur Kunst- und Kulturgeschichte des Benediktinerstiftes Admont, Vol. 4. Benediktinerstift, Admont 1997
- Horst Schweigert: Die Barockbildhauer Johannes Georg und Josef Stammel. Eine stilkritische und rezeptionsgeschichtliche Untersuchung, Leykam, Graz 2004, ISBN 3-7011-7428-8
- Constantin von Wurzbach: "Stammel (Bildhauer)." In: Biographisches Lexikon des Kaiserthums Oesterreich (Biographical Lexicon of the Empire of Austria). Part 37 Kaiserlich-königliche Hof- und Staatsdruckerei, Vienna 1878, p. 114 f. (digitalised).
- Anton Mayr (Ed.): Die Werke des Plastikers Josef Thaddäus Stammel in Admont und anderen Orten (gest. 1765), Vienna, Schroll, 1912

== Gallery ==
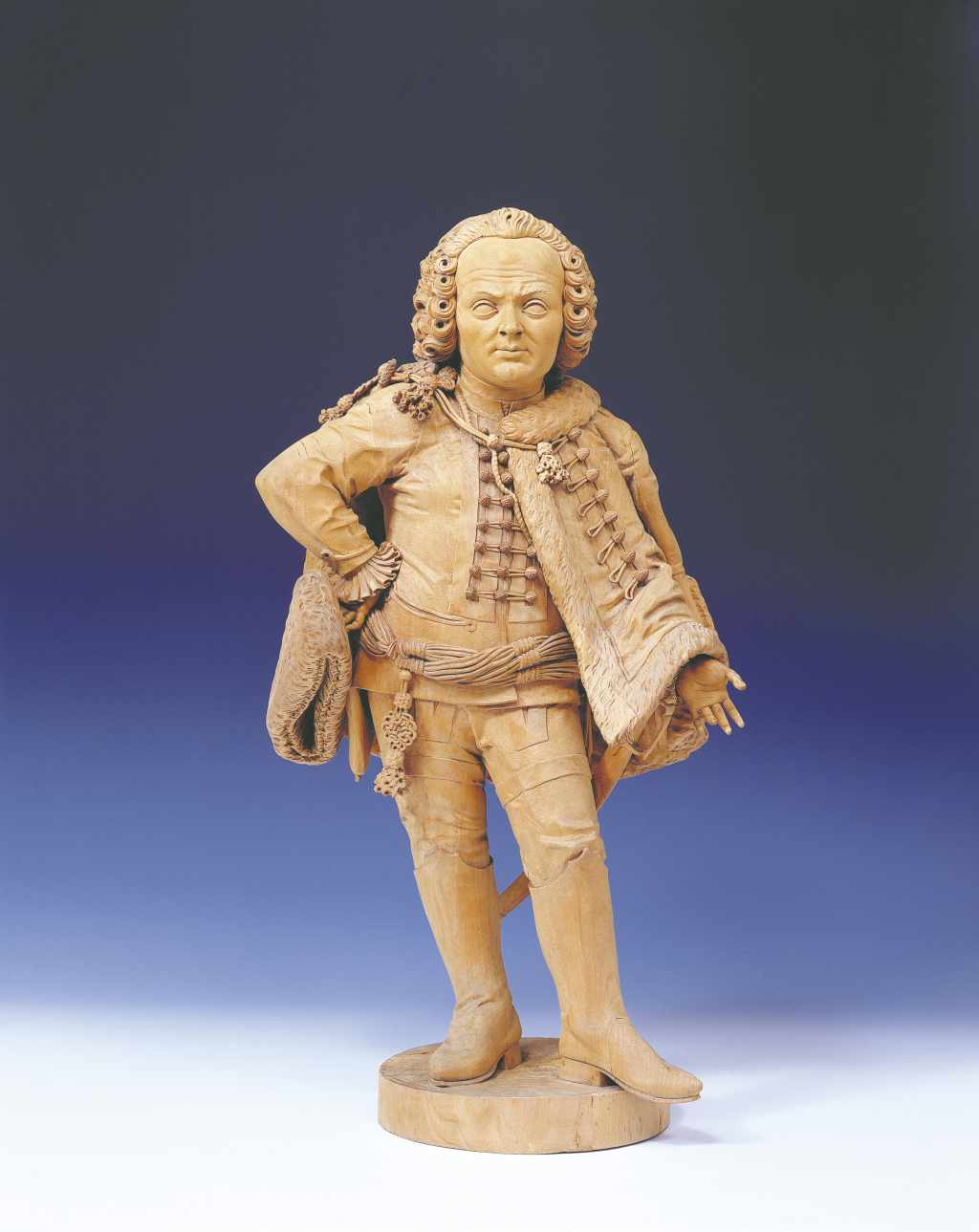
