= John Morgan (poet) =

John Morgan (also known as John Morgan Matchin or John Morgan of Matchin) (7 February 1688 – 28 February 1733 or 1734) was a Welsh clergyman, scholar and poet.

== Life ==
Morgan was born at Llangelynnin, Merionethshire, the younger son of the local curate. He studied at Jesus College, Oxford, from 1704 to 1708, and is thought to have been influenced by Edward Lhuyd, the antiquary, whilst he was there. He was ordained in 1709 and spent a year as curate of Llandegfan, Anglesey. From 1710 to 1713, he was curate of Llanfyllin, Montgomeryshire, before becoming curate (1713) and then vicar (1728) of Matching, Essex, a position he held until his death in February 1733 or 1734. This led to his commonly being known as John Morgan Matchin. He was buried in the parish church in Matching.

== Work ==
Morgan had a particular interest in Welsh literature, and was one of the "London Welsh", a group intent on preserving and promoting Welsh culture in the capital, from around the time of his appointment to Matching. He wrote poetry, but was also a prose writer and translator. His best known work is Myfyrdodau bucheddol ar y pedwar peth diweddaf (‘Devout musings on the four last things’), first published in 1714, became a minor classic, with an eighth edition appearing in 1830, almost one hundred years after his death. Other works include a collection of proverbs and colloquialisms and, it is thought, some translations of Tertullian and Cyprian published in 1716. He was concerned about the English-only education policy of the Society for Promoting Christian Knowledge, saying in letters to his Oxford contemporary Moses Williams that the result would be "barbarism". He also discussed matters of literature and antiquary, and these letters were studied later in the eighteenth century by those involved in the cultural revival of Wales at that time.
