= Zora Janžekovič =

Slovene surgeon

- Born: 30 September 1918; Slovenska Bistrica, Austria-Hungary
- Died: 17 March 2015 (aged 96); Slovenska Bistrica, Slovenia
- Known for: Tangential excision
- Medical career
- Field: Surgery
- Research: Burns

Zora Janžekovič (30 September 1918 – 17 March 2015) was a Slovenian surgeon who did innovative research in burn wound debridement. Under anaesthesia, she carefully shaved away thin layers of dead tissue until healthy, well-perfused tissue was reached, leaving a regenerative skin base. This method is now called tangential excision.

== Early life and education ==
Zora Janžekovič was born in Slovenska Bistrica on 30 September 1918, one of four children of a teacher, Matko and his wife Helena. She spent her early childhood in Ritoznoj, selling apples to earn the money needed to move to Zagreb and pursue medical studies. She graduated from the Faculty of Medicine, University of Zagreb in 1947.

== Career ==
Janžekovič completed her internship at Maribor General Hospital. In 1957 she became a plastic surgeon at the University of Ljubljana.

She did innovative research in burn wound debridement. Under anaesthesia, she carefully shaved away thin layers of dead tissue until healthy, well-perfused tissue was reached, leaving a regenerative skin base. This method is now called tangential excision.

== Death and legacy ==
Janžekovič died on 17 March 2015. The Golden Razor award is named in her honour.

== See also ==
- American Burn Association

== Selected publications ==
- "A new concept in the early excision and immediate grafting of burns". The Journal of Trauma. 10 (12): 1103–1108. December 1970. ISSN 0022-5282. PMID 4921723.
- "The burn wound from the surgical point of view". The Journal of Trauma. 15 (1): 42–62. January 1975. ISSN 0022-5282. PMID 1090743.
- "Az égés kezelése tegnap és ma" [Burn management past and present]. Magyar Traumatologia, Orthopaedia Es Helyreallito Sebeszet (in Hungarian). 18 (4): 260–264. 1975. ISSN 0025-0317. PMID 1589.
- "Once upon a time ... how west discovered east". Journal of Plastic, Reconstructive & Aesthetic Surgery. 61 (3): 240–244. 2008. doi:10.1016/j.bjps.2008.01.001. ISSN 1748-6815. PMID 18243082.
