= Engelbert of Admont =

Abbot of the Benedictine monastery of Admont

Engelbert (c. 1250 – 12 May 1331) was Abbot of the Benedictine monastery of Admont in Styria.

== Life ==
He was born of noble parents at Wolkersdorf im Weinviertel, and entered the monastery of Admont about 1267. Four years later he was sent to Prague to study grammar and logic. After devoting himself for two years to these studies he spent nine years at the University of Padua studying philosophy and theology.

In 1297 he was elected Abbot of Admont, and after ruling thirty years he resigned this dignity when he was almost eighty years old, in order to spend the remainder of his life in prayer and study. Engelbert was one of the most learned men of his times, and there was scarcely any branch of knowledge to which his versatile pen did not contribute its share.

== Works ==
His literary productions include works on moral and dogmatic theology, philosophy, history, political science, the Bible, the natural sciences, pedagogy, and music.

The best known of Engelbert's works is his historico-political treatise De ortu, progressu et fine Romani imperii, which was written during the reign of Emperor Henry VII (1308–1313). It puts forth the following political principles: a ruler must be a learned man; his sole aim must be the welfare of his subjects; an unjust ruler may be justly deposed; emperor and pope are, each in his sphere, independent rulers; the Holy Roman Empire is a Christian continuation of the pagan empire of ancient Rome; there should be only one supreme temporal ruler, the emperor, to whom all other temporal rulers should be subject. He bewails the gradual decline of both imperial and papal authority, prophesies the early coming of Antichrist and with it the ruin of the Holy Roman Empire and a wholesale desertion of the Holy See. The work was published repeatedly.

Other works of Engelbert include:

- De gratus et virtutibus beatae et gloriosae semper V. Marie
- De libero arbitrio
- De causâ longaevitatis hominum ante diluvium
- De providentiâ Dei
- De statu defunctorum
- Speculum virtutis pro Alberto et Ottone Austriae ducibus
- Super passionem secundum Matthaeum
- De regimine principum, a work on political science, containing suggestions on education in general;
- De summo bono hominis in hâc vitâ
- Dialogus concupiscentiae et rationis
- Utrum sapienti competat ducere uxorem
- De musica tractatus, a treatise on music, illustrating the great difficulties with which teachers of music were beset in consequence of the complicated system of the hexachord with its solmization and mutation. The treatise was inserted by Gerbert in his Scriptores ecclesiastici de musicâ sacrâ
