= Martin of Cochem =

German Capuchin theologian, preacher and ascetic writer

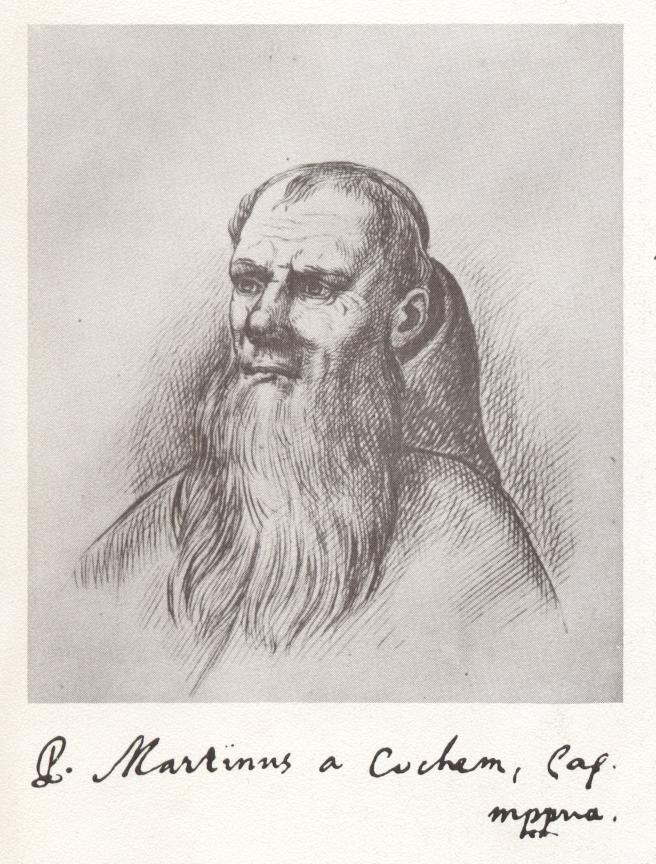
Photo of Martin of Cochem

Martin of Cochem (born at Cochem on the Mosel, 13 December 1630 or 1634; died in the convent at Waghäusel, 10 September 1712) was a German Capuchin theologian, preacher, and ascetic writer.

== Life ==
He came from a Catholic family, and while still young entered the novitiate of the Capuchins. After his ordination to the priesthood, he was assigned to a professorship of theology.

In 1666, he was involved in the care of plague victims, and began to compose short popular religious treatises. Martin then made a specialty of popular preaching and religious writing in the Archdiocese of Trier and Archdiocese of Ingelheim. He continued up to the time of his death, hearing confessions with the aid of an ear-trumpet.

== Works ==
The most voluminous is an ecclesiastical history in 2 vols, fol., composed for apologetic purposes and provoked by the attacks made upon the Catholic Church by Protestantism. However, the author brought it down only to the year 1100.

Father Martin's other works embrace a great variety of subjects: the life of Christ, legends of the saints, edifying narratives, the setting forth of certain points in Christian asceticism, forms of prayer, methods to be followed for the worthy reception of the sacraments, etc. The best known is "Die heilige Messe", on which, according to his own statement, he spent three years.

The works published during Father Martin's lifetime are:

- "Die Kirchenhistorie nach der Methode des Baronius und Raynaldus bis 1100" (Dillingen, 1693):
- "Die christliche Lehre";
- "Heilige Geschichten und Exempel";
- "Wohlriechender Myrrhengarten" (Cologne, 1693);
- "Büchlein über den Ablass" (Dillingen, 1693);
- "Exorcismen und für Kranke" (Frankfort, 1695);
- "Goldener Himmelsschlüssel" (Frankfort, 1695);
- "Gebetbuch für Soldaten" (Augsburg, 1698);
- "Anmuthungen während der heiligen Messe" (Augsburg, 1697);
- "Das grössere Krancken=Buch, denen Gesunden so wohl als Krancken sehr nützlich und nothwenig." (Frankfurt am Main, 1701);
- "Die Legenden der Heiligen" (Augsburg, 1705);
- "Leben Christi" (Frankfort, 1689; Augsburg, 1708);
- "Gebete unter der heiligen Messe" (Augsburg, 1698);
- "Kern der heiligen Messe" (Cologne, 1699);
- "Liliengarten" (Cologne, 1699);
- "Gebetbuch für heilige Zeiten" (Augsburg, 1704);
- "Die heilige Messe für die Weitleute" (Cologne, 1704);
- "Traktat über die göttlichen Vortrefflichkeiten" (Mainz, 1707);
- "Geistlicher Baumgarten" (Mainz and Heidelberg, 1709);
- "Neue mystische Goldgruben" (Cologne, 1709);
- "Exemepelbuch" (Augsburg, 1712).

In English:

- Four Last Things: Death - Judgement - Hell - Heaven (Imprimatur: Michael Augustine - Archbishop of New York: New York 5 October 1899. Benziger Brothers).
- The Incredible Catholic Mass: An Explanation of the Mass / Published by TAN Books

This list does not include all the author's writings. In 1896 there appeared a small work never before published, "Das Gebet des Herzens", which at the end of its third year went into a seventh edition.
