= Admont Abbey =

Benedictine monastery in Styria, Austria

- Stift Admont
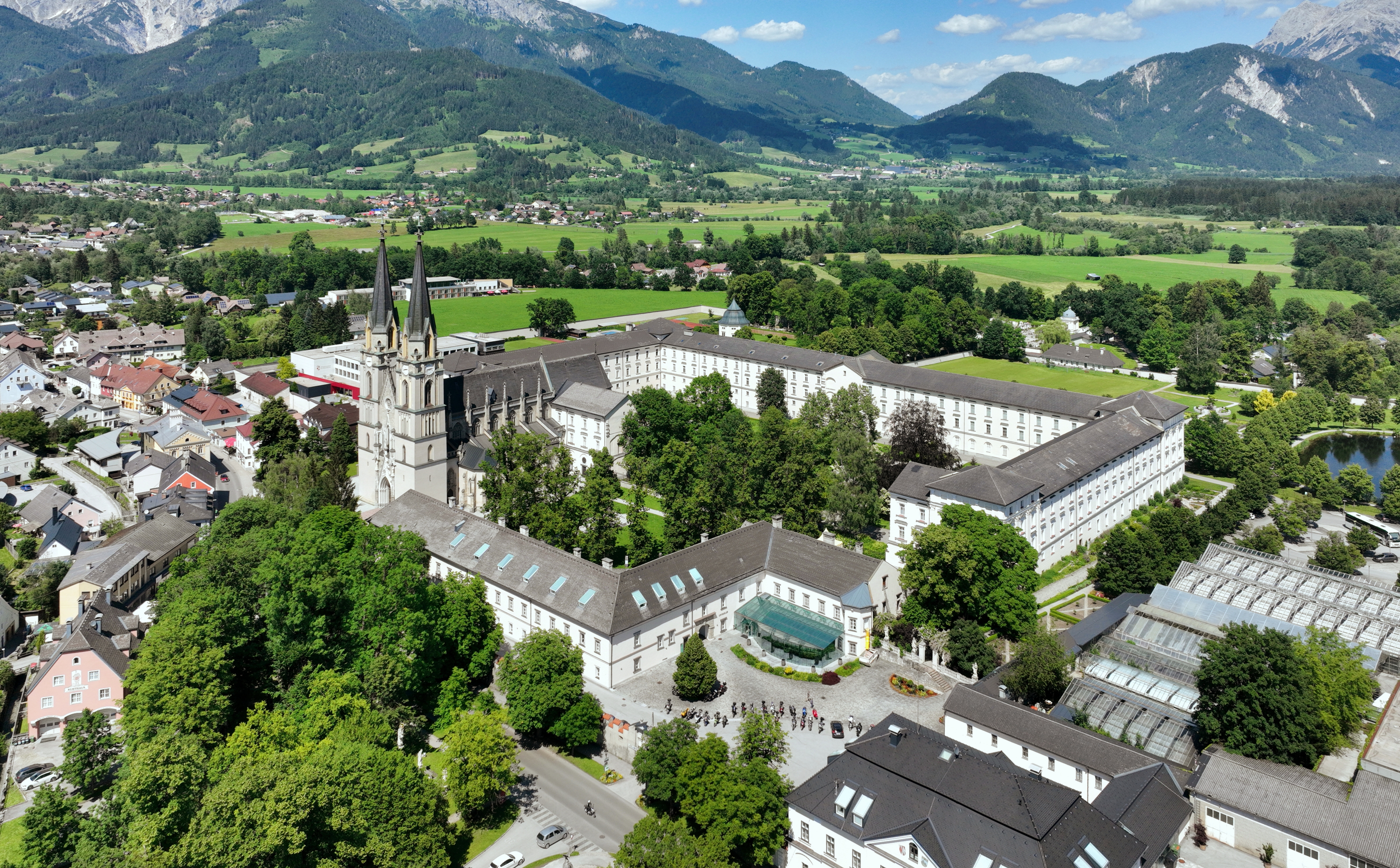
- Southwest view of the Admont Abbey
- Interactive map of Admont Abbey

Monastery information
- Order: Benedictine

Site
- Location: Admont
- Country: Austria
- Coordinates: 47.575176133452594°N 14.463253888557226°E
- Website: stiftadmont.at

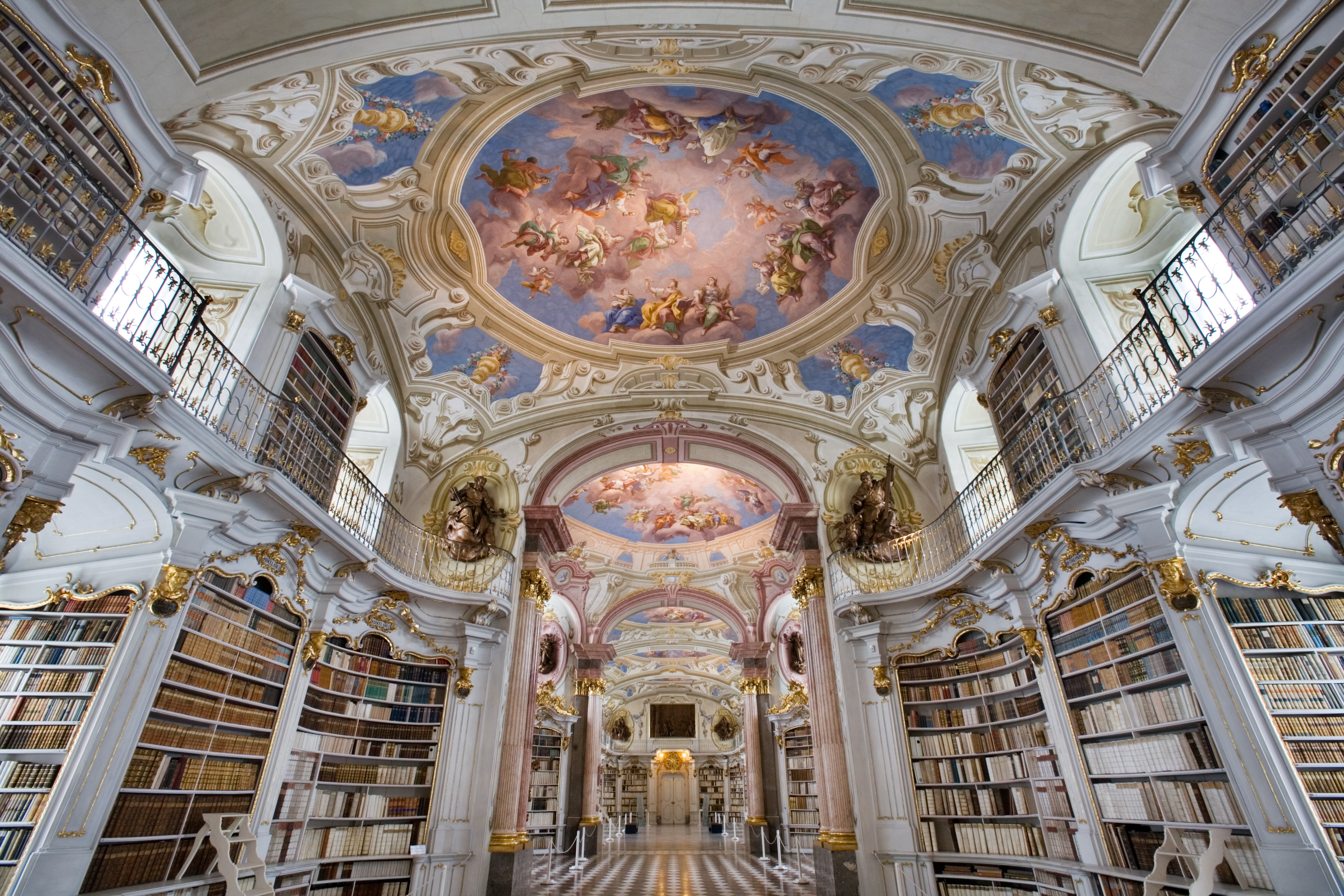
Interior of the Admont Library.

Admont Abbey (German: Stift Admont, IPA: [ʃ͡tɪft ˈaːdˌmont]) is a Benedictine monastery located on the Enns River in the town of Admont, Styria, Austria. The oldest remaining monastery in Styria, Admont Abbey says it contains the largest monastic library in the world as well as a long-established scientific collection. It is known for its Baroque architecture, art, and manuscripts.

The abbey's location borders the mountainous Gesäuse National Park (the name Admont derives from the Latin expression "ad montes", which means "at the mountains").

== History ==
Dedicated to Saint Blaise, Admont Abbey was founded in 1074 by Archbishop Gebhard of Salzburg on land left by Hemma of Gurk, and settled by monks from St. Peter's Abbey in Salzburg under abbot Isingrin. The second abbot, Giselbert, is said to have introduced the Cluniac reforms here. Another of the early abbots, Wolfhold, established a convent for the education of girls of noble families, and the educational tradition has remained strong ever since. The monastery prospered during the Middle Ages and possessed a productive scriptorium. Abbot Engelbert of Admont (1297–1327) was a notable scholar and author of many works.

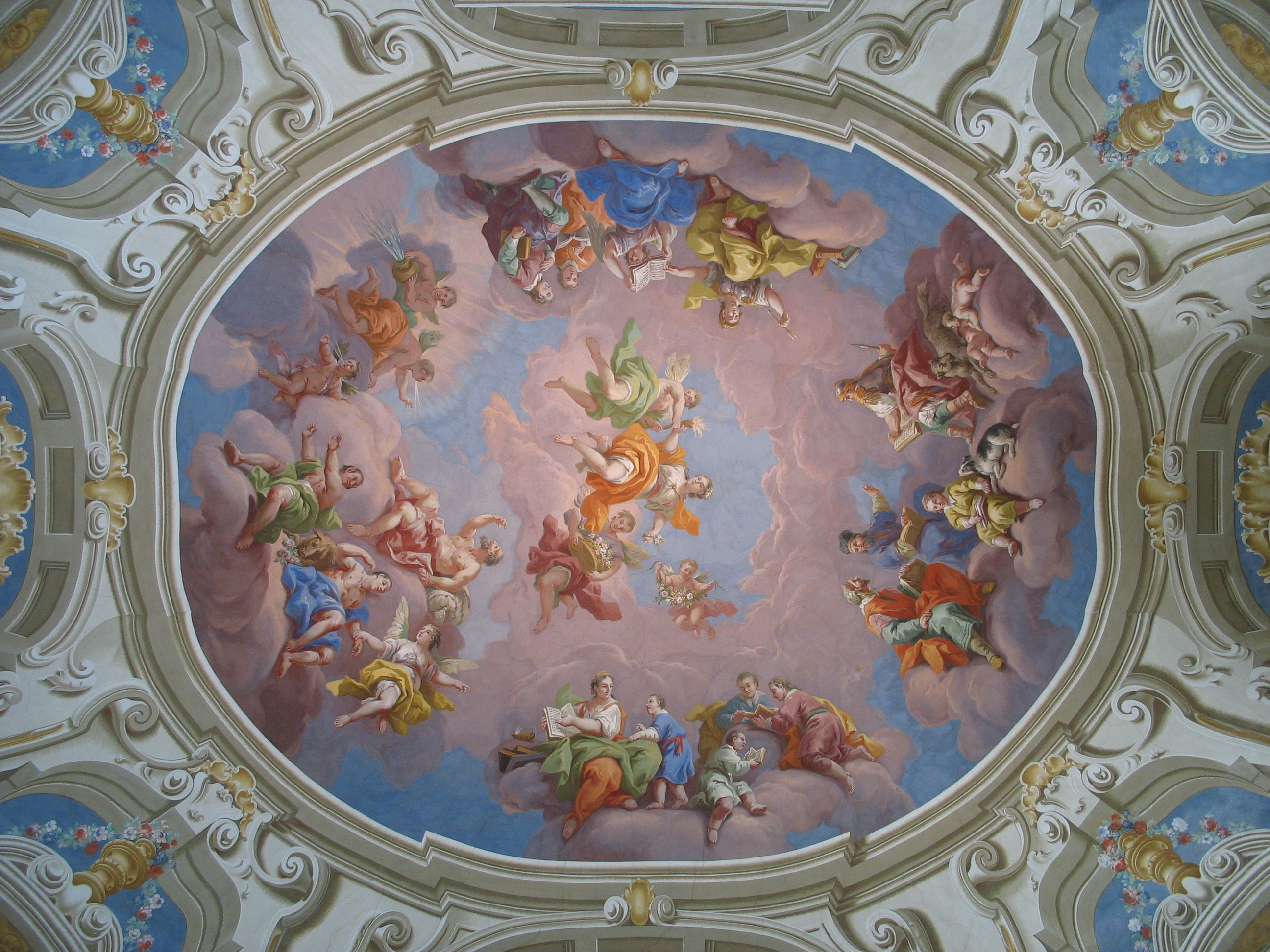
One of the seven ceiling frescoes painted by Bartolomeo Altomonte in his 80th year for the library. An allegory of the Enlightenment, it shows Aurora, goddess of dawn, with the geniuses of language in her train awakening Morpheus, god of dreaming, a symbol of man. The geniuses are Grammar, Didactic, Greek, Hebrew, and Latin.

The wars against the Ottoman Empire and the Reformation (Abbot Valentine was obliged to resign because of his Reformed views) caused a lengthy decline, but with the Counter-Reformation the abbey flourished once again. In addition to the secondary school, which later moved to Judenburg, there were faculties of theology and philosophy. Abbot Albert von Muchar was well known as an historian and taught at the University of Graz.

In the 17th and 18th centuries, the abbey reached a high point of artistic productivity, with the works of the world-famous ecclesiastical embroiderer Brother Benno Haan (1631–1720) and the sculptor Josef Stammel.

On 27 April 1865, a fire destroyed almost the entire monastery. While the monastic archives burned, the library could be salvaged. Reconstruction began the following year but was still not complete by 1890.

The economic crises of the 1930s forced the abbey to sell off many of its art treasures, and during the period of the Nazi government the monastery was dissolved and the monks evicted. They were able to return in 1946 and the abbey today is again a thriving Benedictine community.

From 1641, the abbey was a member of the Salzburg Congregation, which in 1930 was merged into the present Austrian Congregation of the Benedictine Confederation.

== Abbey church ==
The church was designed by the architect Wilhelm Bücher to replace the former church after the fire of 1865. The two west towers are 67 metres tall, and the facade contains figures of Saint Benedict and Saint Scholastica. The figure of the church's patron, Saint Blaise, tops the pinnacle of the west door.

The interior consists of a central aisle and two side aisles, off each of which are five side chapels and six altars. The picture on the altar of Mary, Maria Immaculata, is by Martino Altomonte (1657–1745).

A statue of Saint Blaise stands on top of the high altar of white Carrara marble. The choir is decorated with early 18th century tapestries by Benno Haan. In the Chapel of St. Benedict is a Baroque Corpus Christi from the workshop of Johann Meinrad Guggenbichler.

== 21st century ==
As of July 2025, the community at Admont consisted of 26 monks and the abbot was Gerhard Hafner.

== Library ==
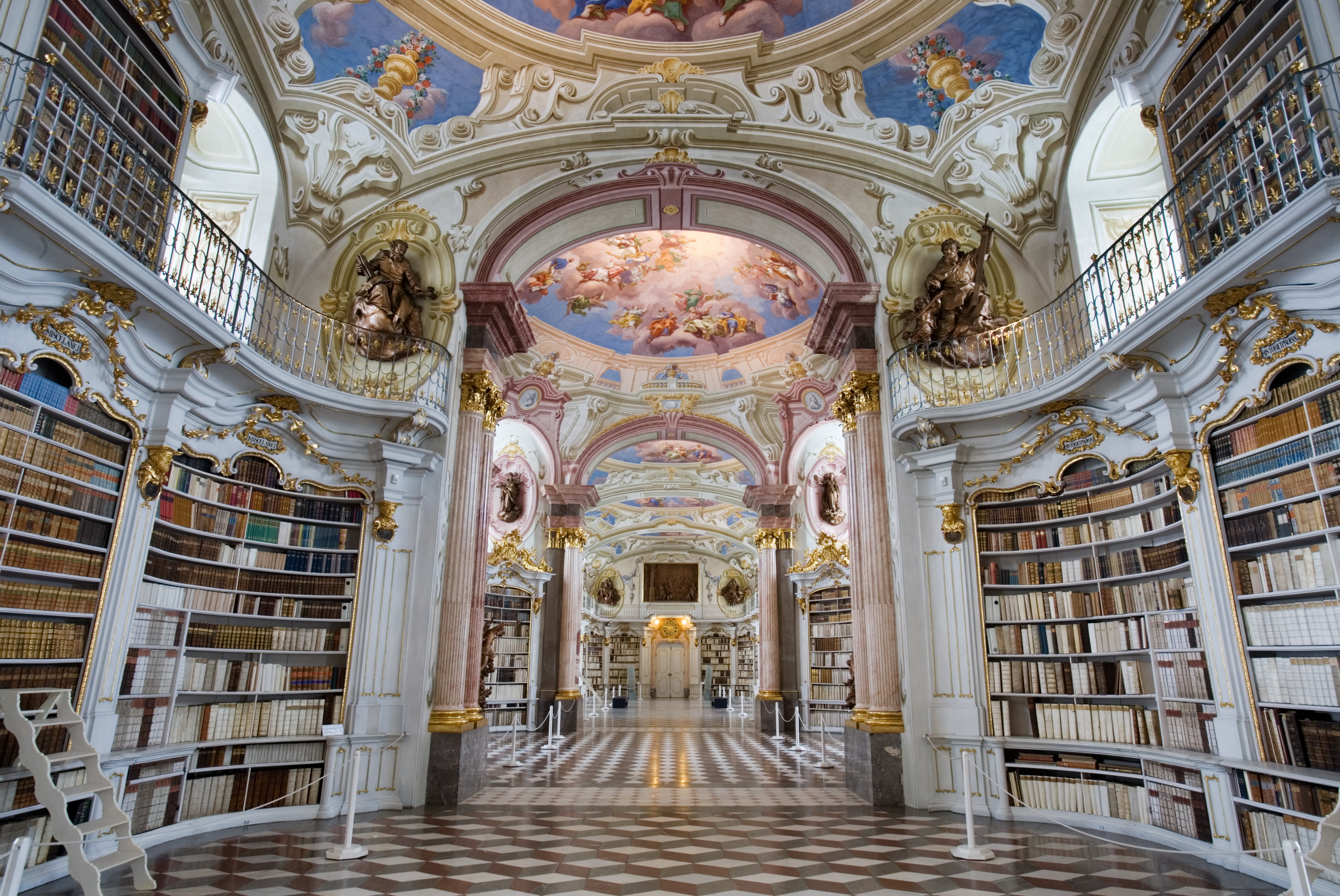
Admont Abbey Library

The library hall was built in 1776 to designs by the architect Joseph Hueber and is of late-baroque gilded style. It is 70 metres long, 14 metres wide and 13 metres high. It contains c. 70,000 volumes of the monastery's entire holdings of c. 200,000 volumes. The ceiling consists of seven cupolas, decorated with frescoes by Bartolomeo Altomonte.

The abbey possesses over 1,400 manuscripts as well as over 900 incunabulae.

== Burials ==
- Gebhard of Salzburg
- Engelbert of Admont
- Anastasia of Kiev
- Conrad of Babenberg

== Museums ==
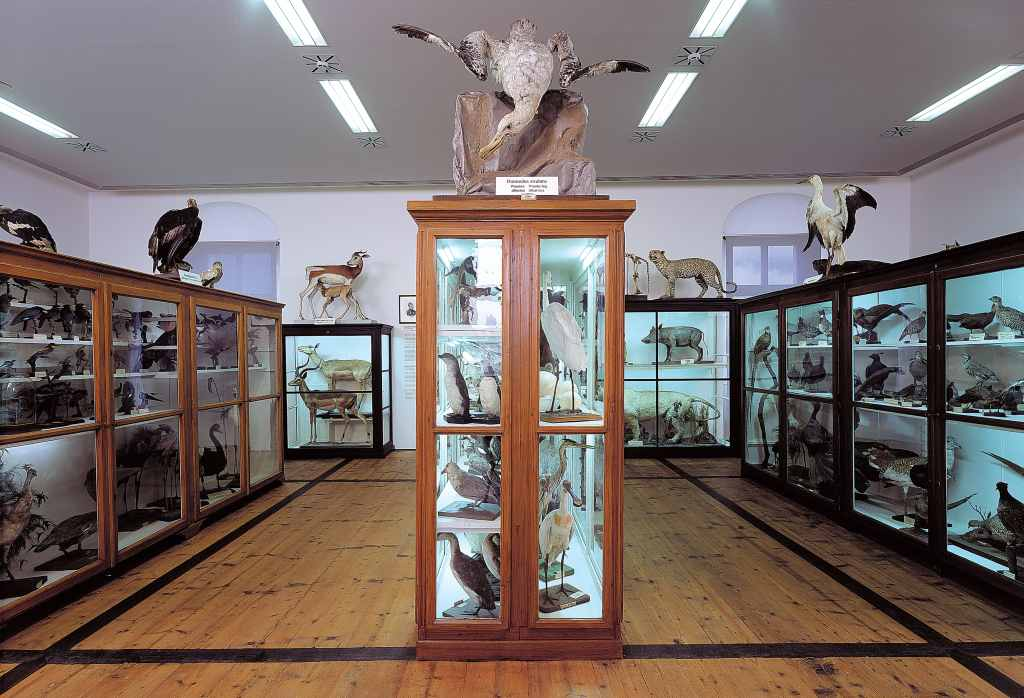
Natural History Museum

Since the Baroque period the abbots had accumulated a collection of "curiosities" and scientific specimens of various sorts, which were entirely destroyed in the fire of 1865. As part of the reconstruction, Father Gabriel Strobl determined to replace the lost collections, and so formed the nucleus of the modern museums. Father Strobl was himself a botanist but also worked on building up the insect collection, so much so that he became one of the great entomologists of his day. The Natural History museum now contains over 250,000 insect specimens, including one of the three largest collections of flies, or Diptera, in Europe.

== Gallery ==
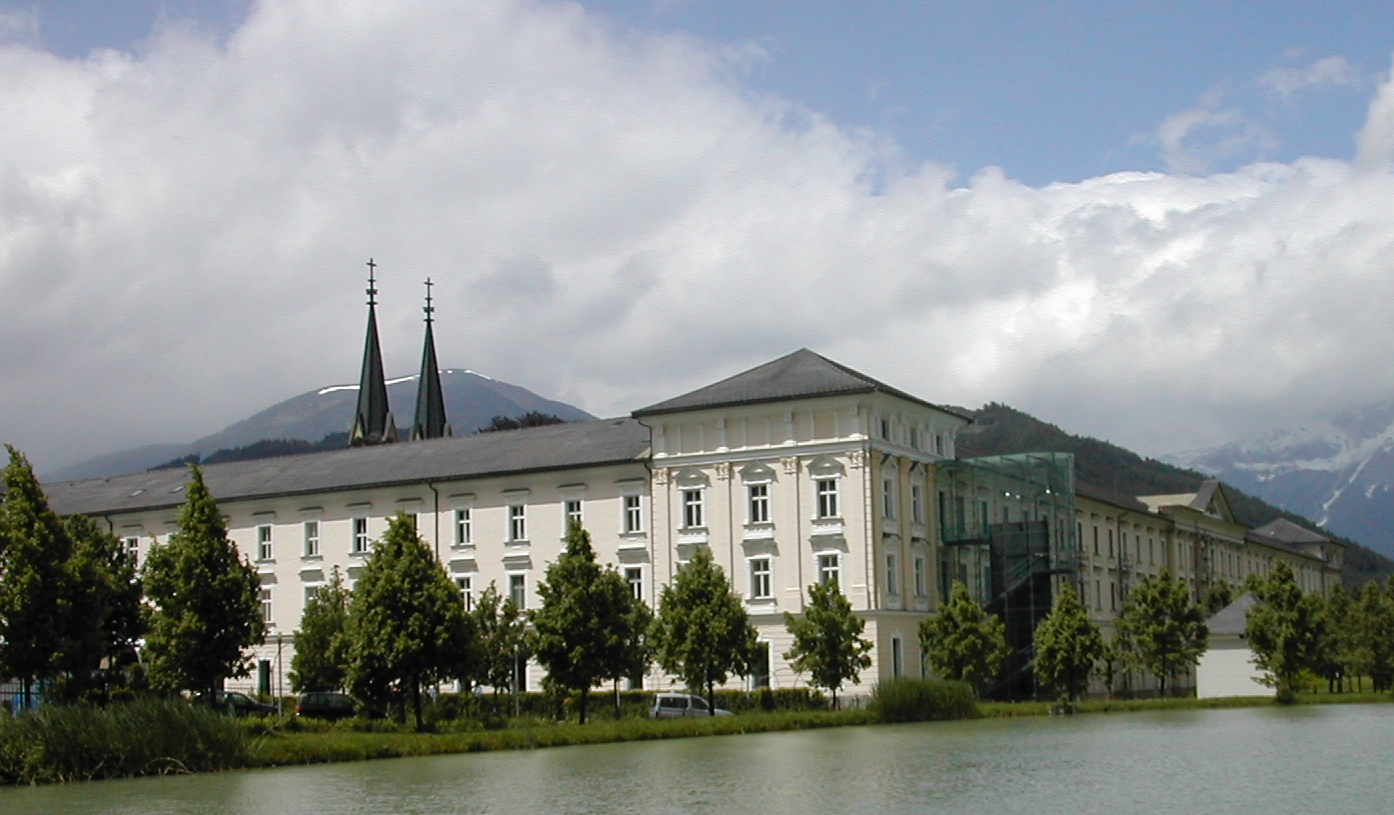
Admont Abbey

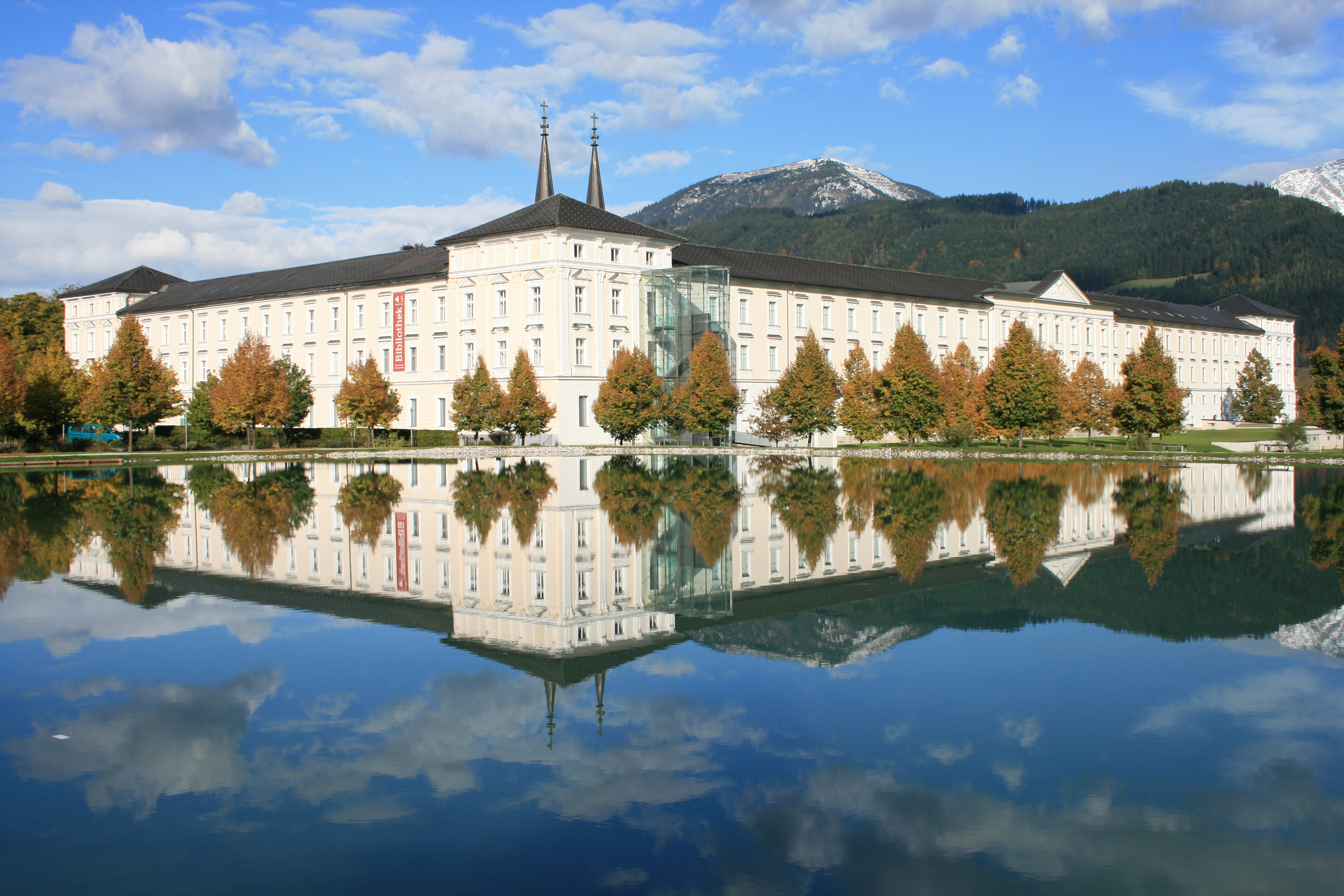
Admont Abbey

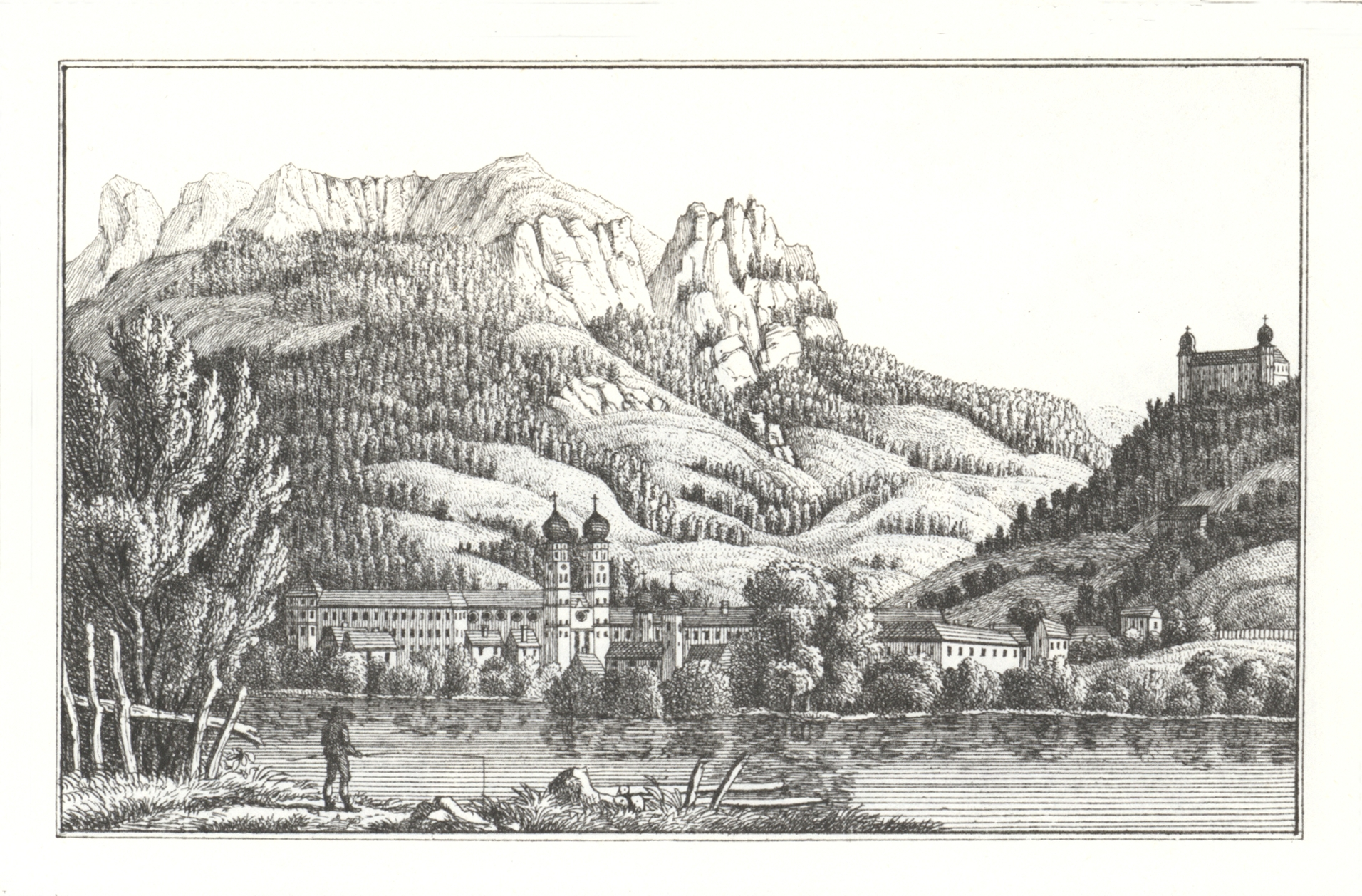
Lithograph by Joseph Franz Kaiser, 1825

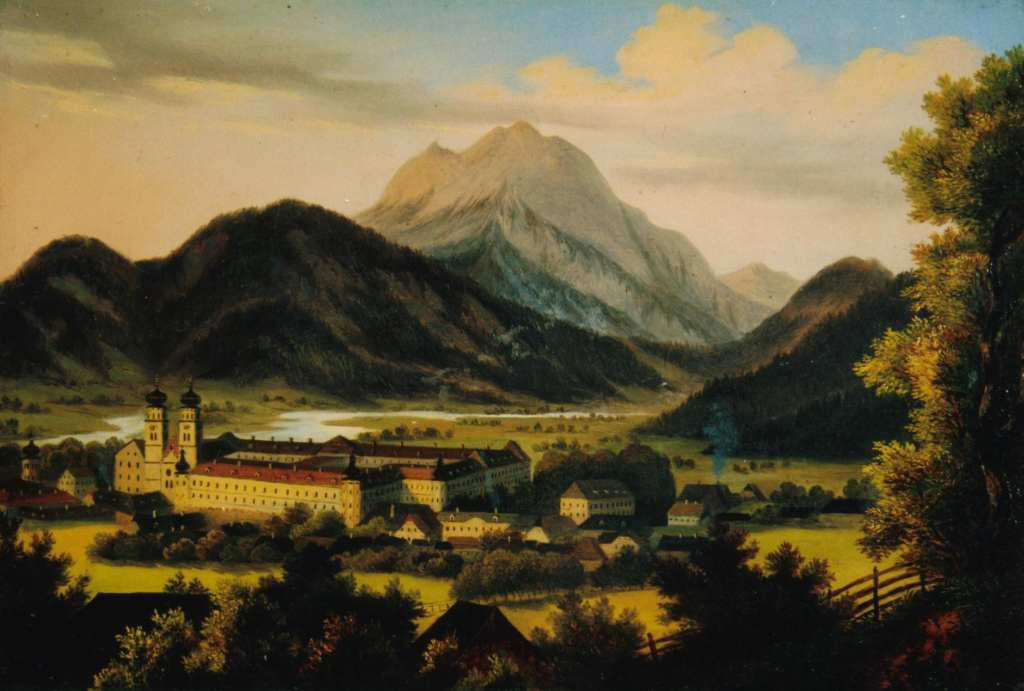
Oil painting by Anton Schiffer, 1840

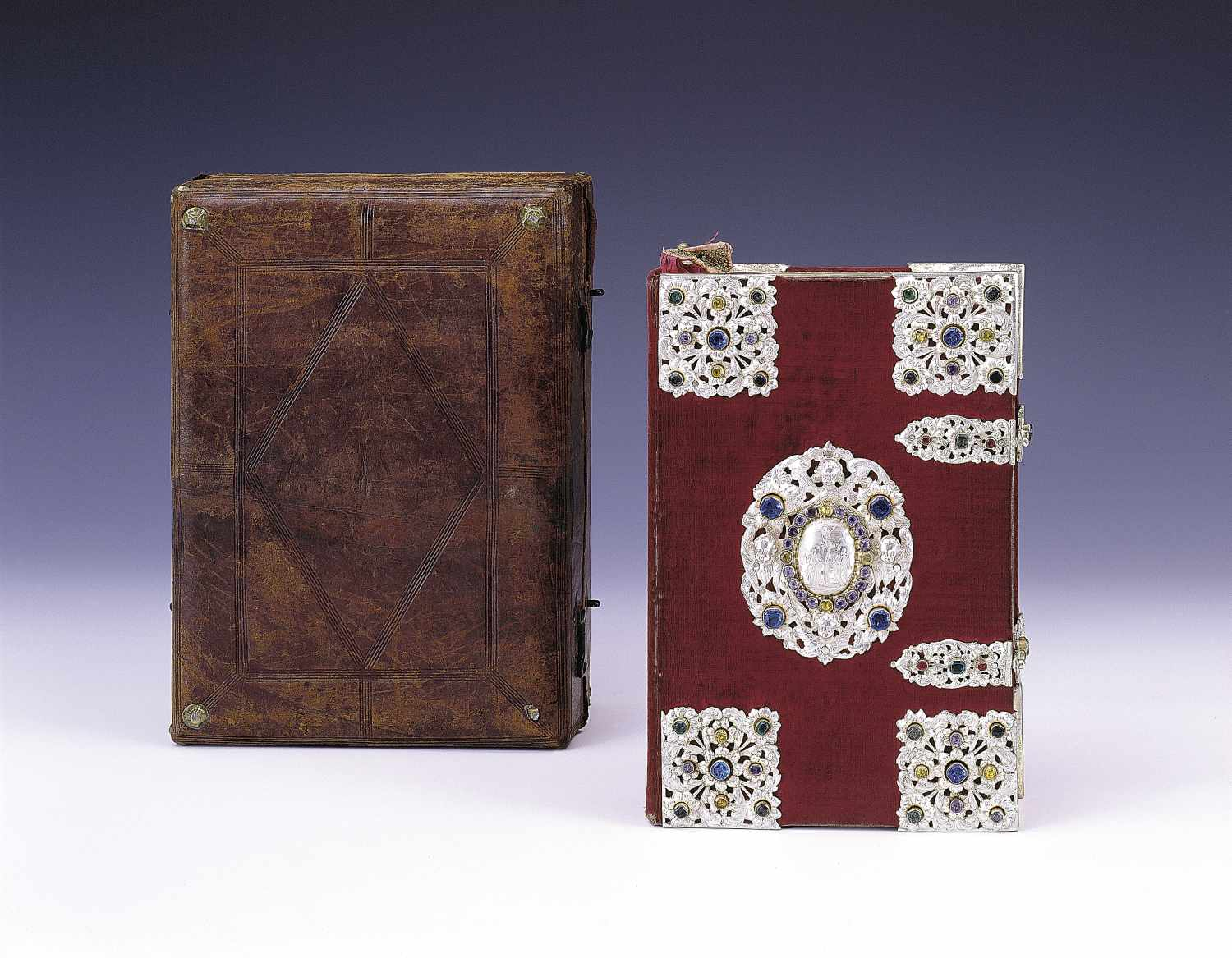
Handschriften und Inkunabeln

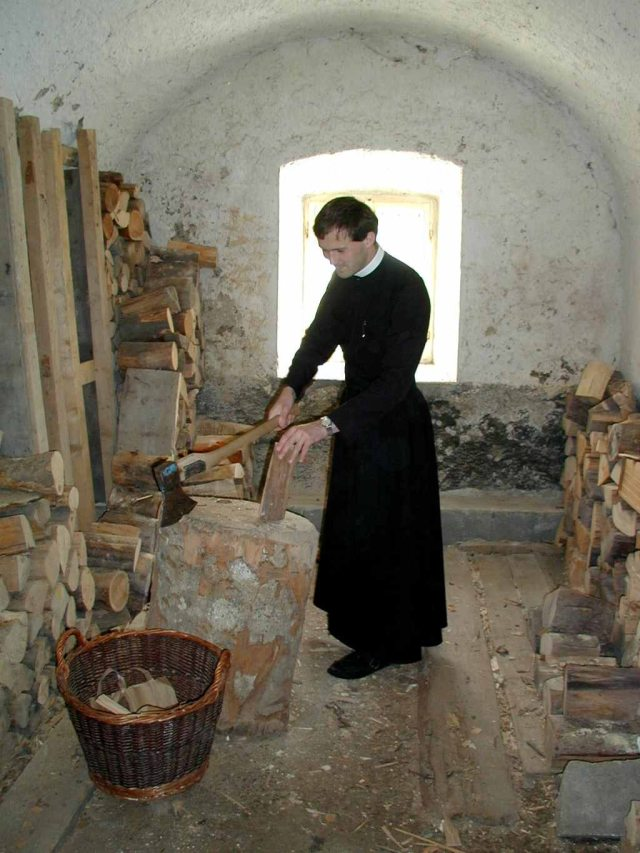
Ora et labora

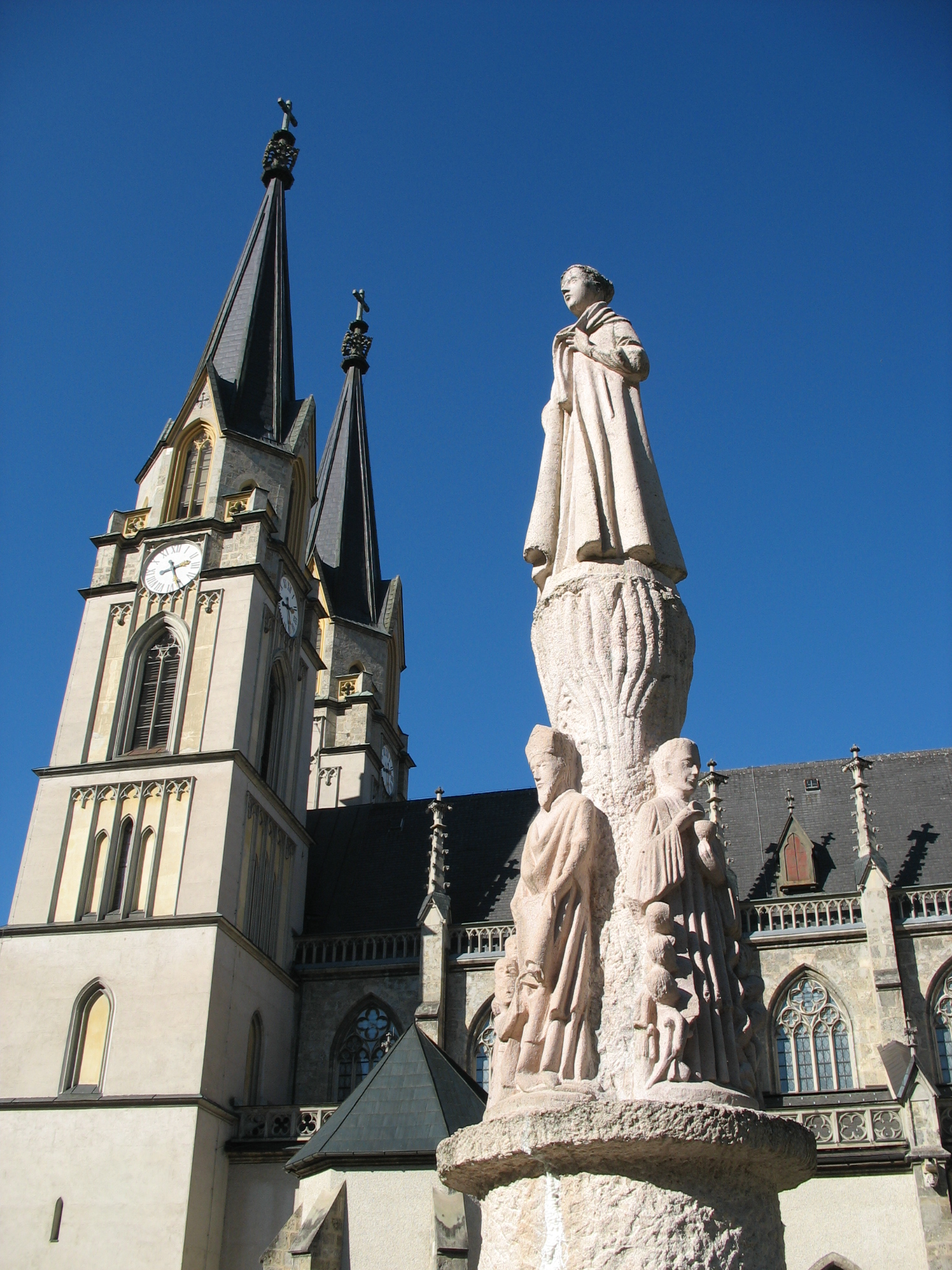
Hemma Statue

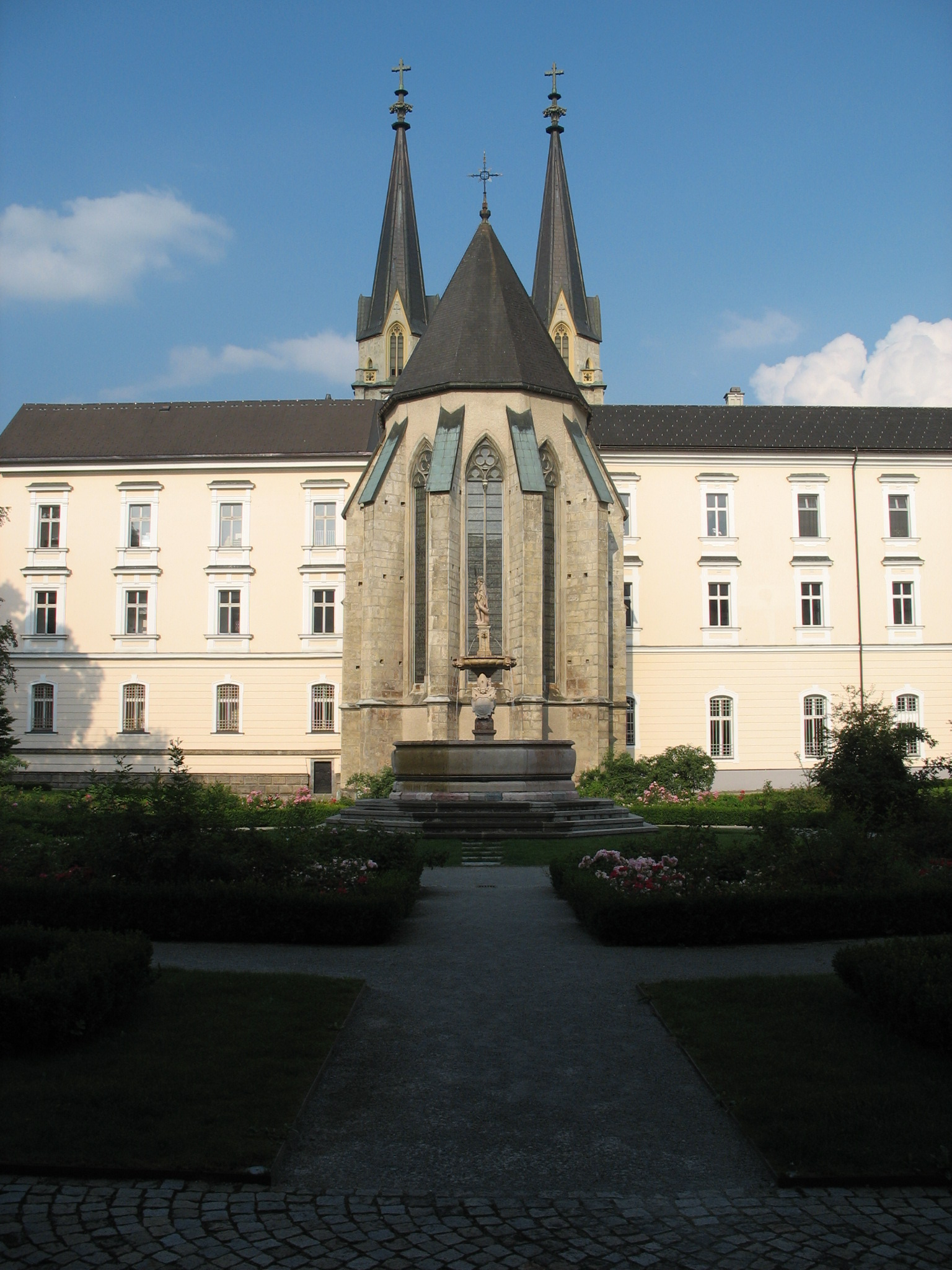
Rosarium

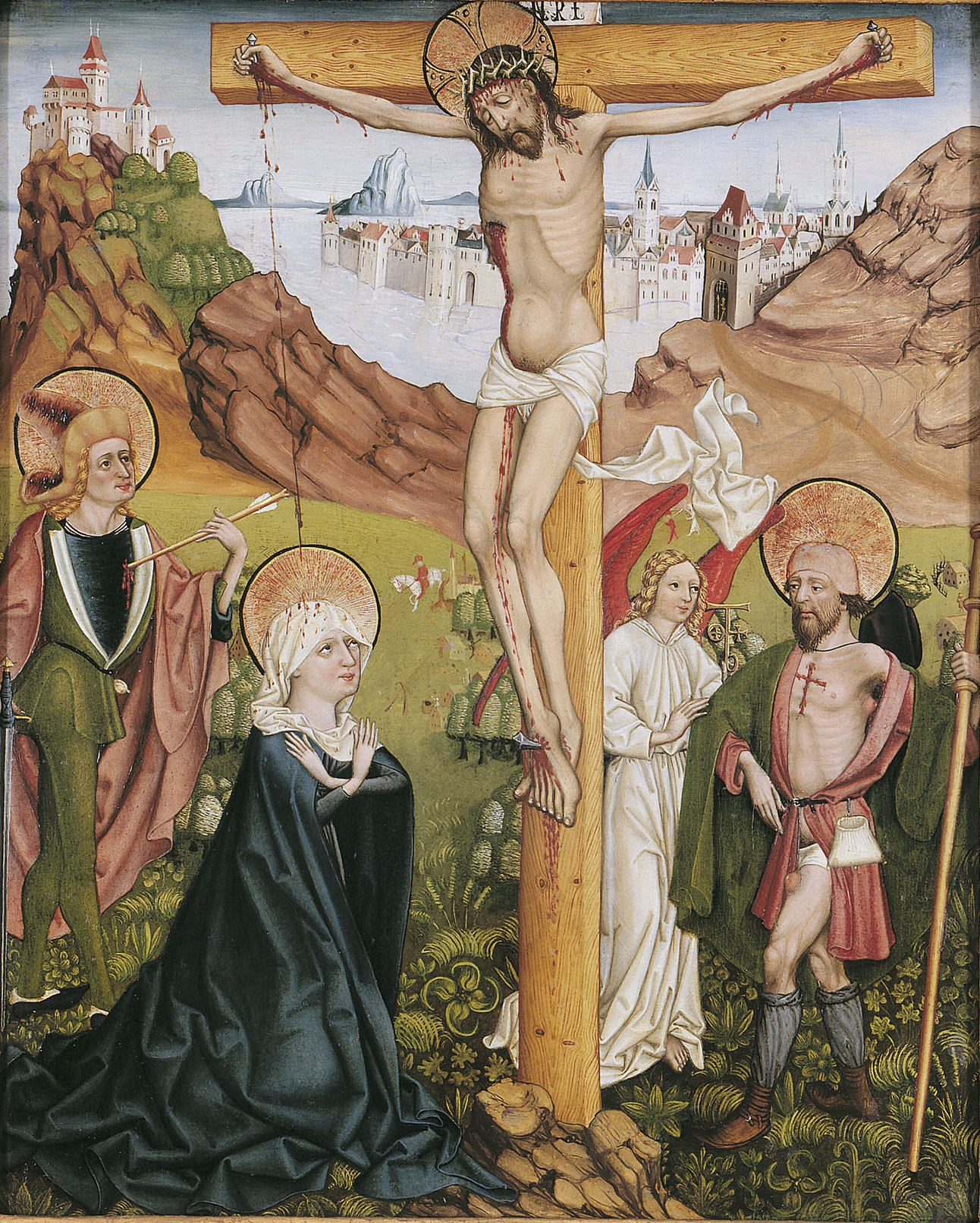
Admont Crucifixion
