= Slovenska Bistrica Castle =

Building in Slovenska Bistrica, Slovenia

Coordinates: 46°23′37.95″N 15°34′15.43″E

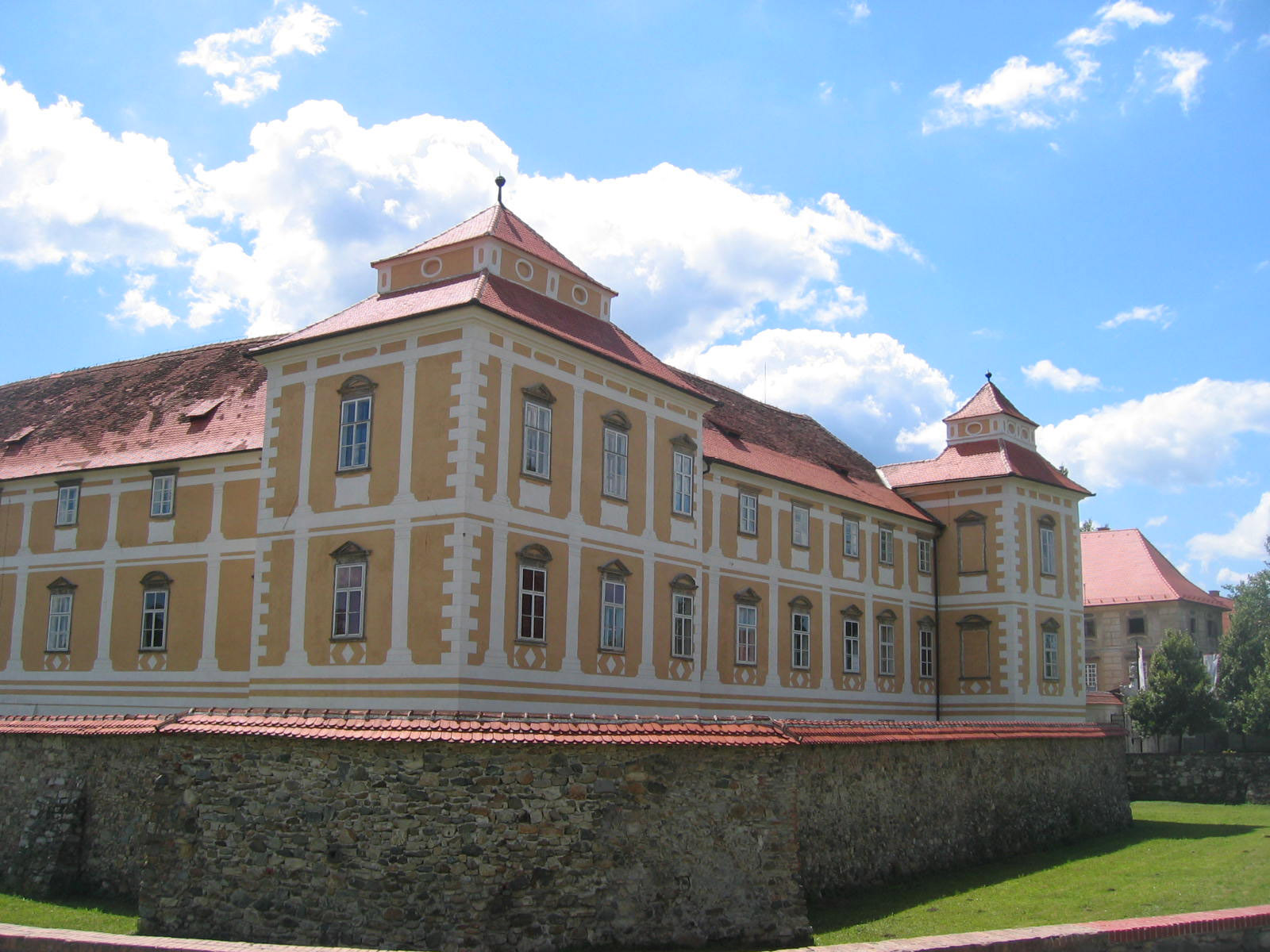
Slovenska Bistrica Castle

Slovenska Bistrica Castle (Slovene: Grad Slovenska Bistrica, German: Schloss Windische Feistritz), also known as Bistrica Castle (Slovene: Grad Bistrica, German: Schloss Feistritz), is a Renaissance-Baroque palace outside the town of Slovenska Bistrica in northeastern Slovenia. Its name derives from the Slovene word bistra 'clear'.

== History ==
The predecessor of the current Slovenska Bistrica castle is first mentioned in 1265, when emperor Rudolf gave it and the adjoining town in fief to count (from 1286 duke of Carinthia) Meinhard of Gorizia. In 1313, it passed to the Habsburgs, who leased the castle and town to the House of Walsee, an old Austrian noble family. After 1368, the lordship was obtained by the Counts of Celje; after their extinction in 1456 it reverted to the ducal lands. In 1587, the town and castle were bought by Hans Vetter; in 1717 the castle only was sold to the Counts of Attems, who retained until the end of World War II, when it was nationalized.

During the Attems tenure, the castle was the home of the painter and historian Countess Maria von Attems-Petzenstein (born 1893).

In 1996 the castle became the seat of the Cultural Institute of Slovenska Bistrica.

== Architecture ==
The mansion is located on the northwest side of the mediaeval old town of Slovenska Bistrica. Rebuilt into a renaissance mansion in the 17th century, the foundations of the current building adjoin one of the defensive towers of its fortified predecessor.

The layout is trapezoidal, with a turret at each corner and an arcaded inner courtyard. The entire building is surrounded with a moat, now dry. The surrounding estate was planted with rare trees, now neglected, and a hornbeam tree row. The Attems decorated the interior in the early 18th century; the castle features a painted staircase, a chapel dedicated to the Virgin Mary, and a richly appointed great hall.
