= Slovenska Bistrica =

Town in Styria, Slovenia

- Town
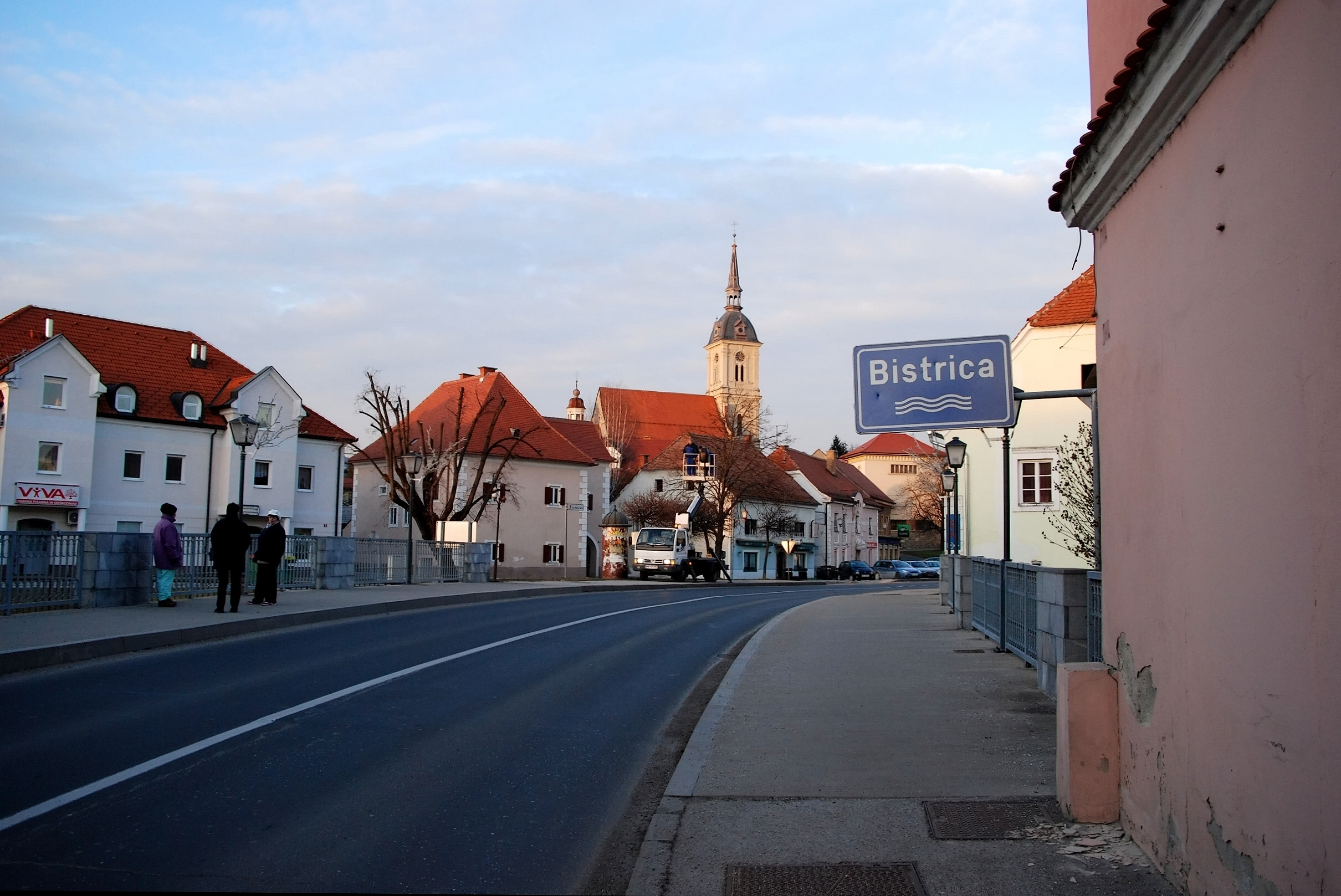
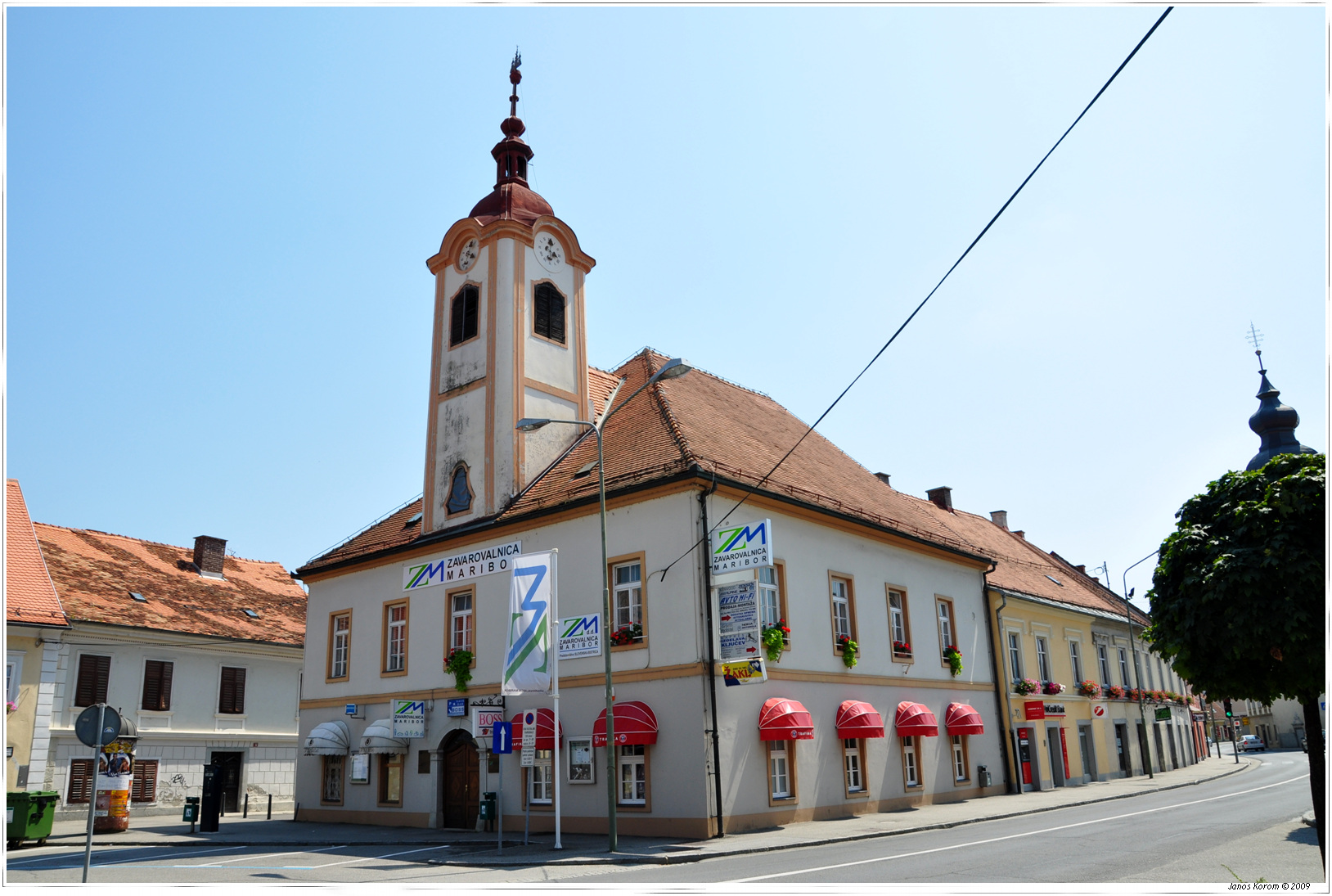
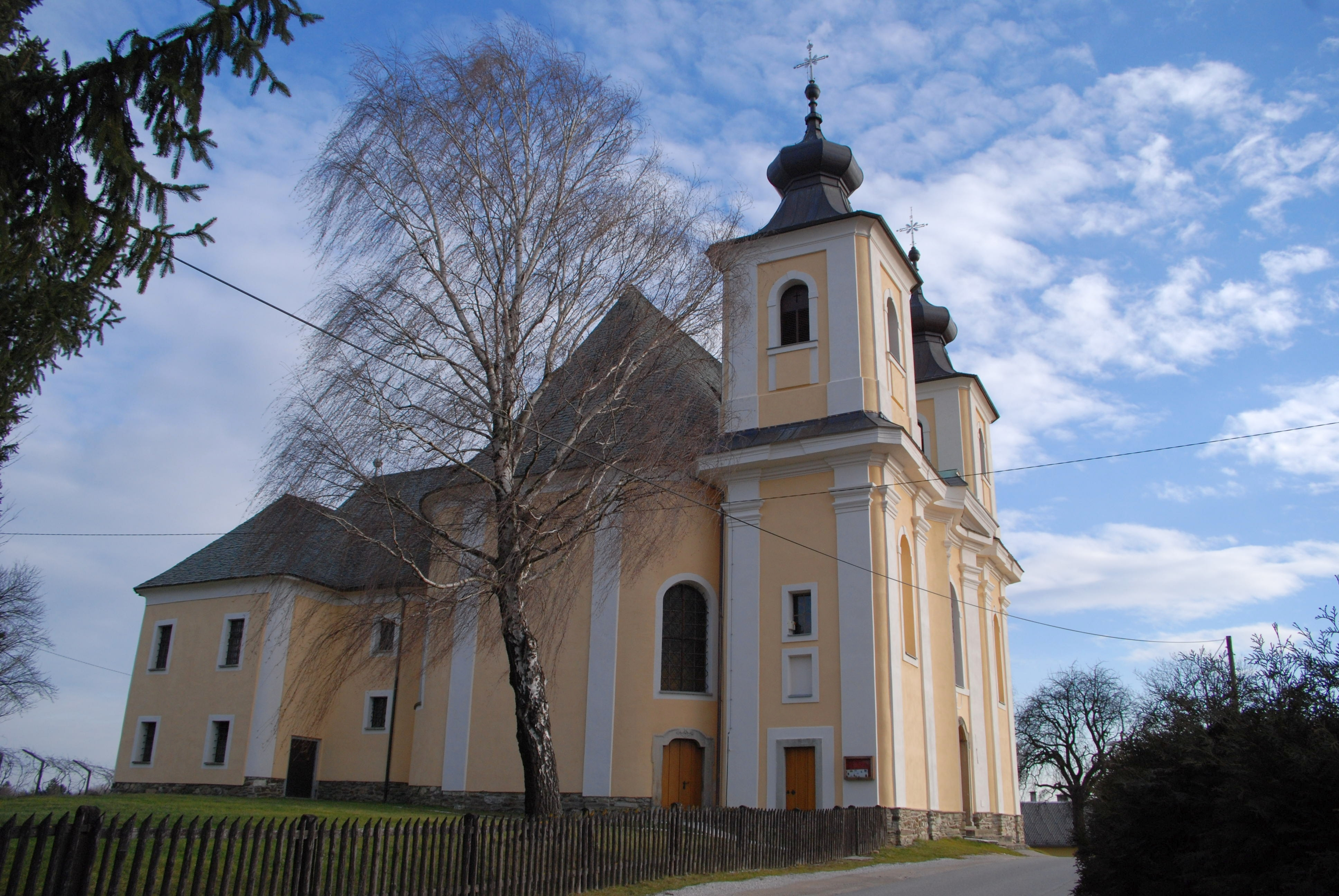
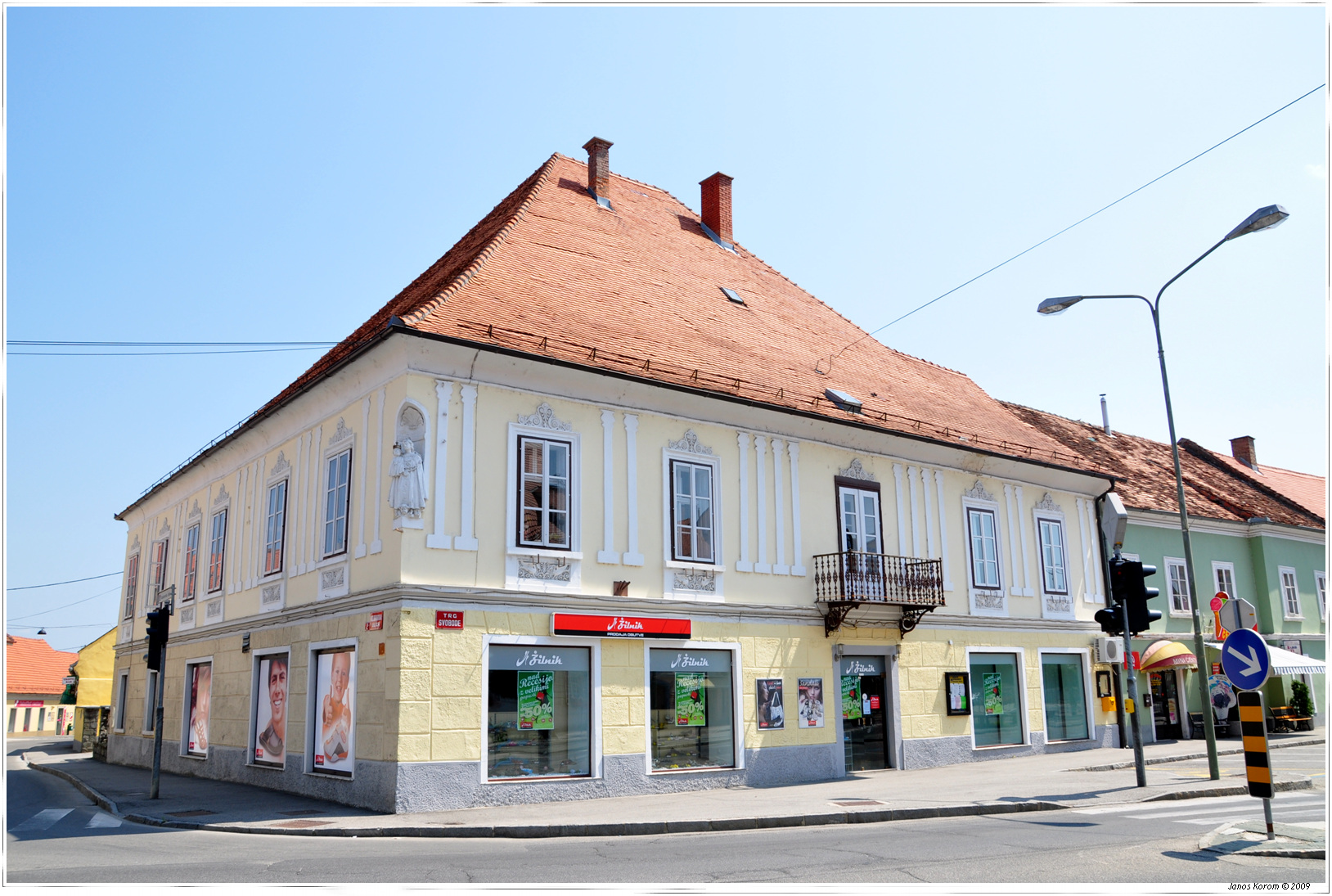
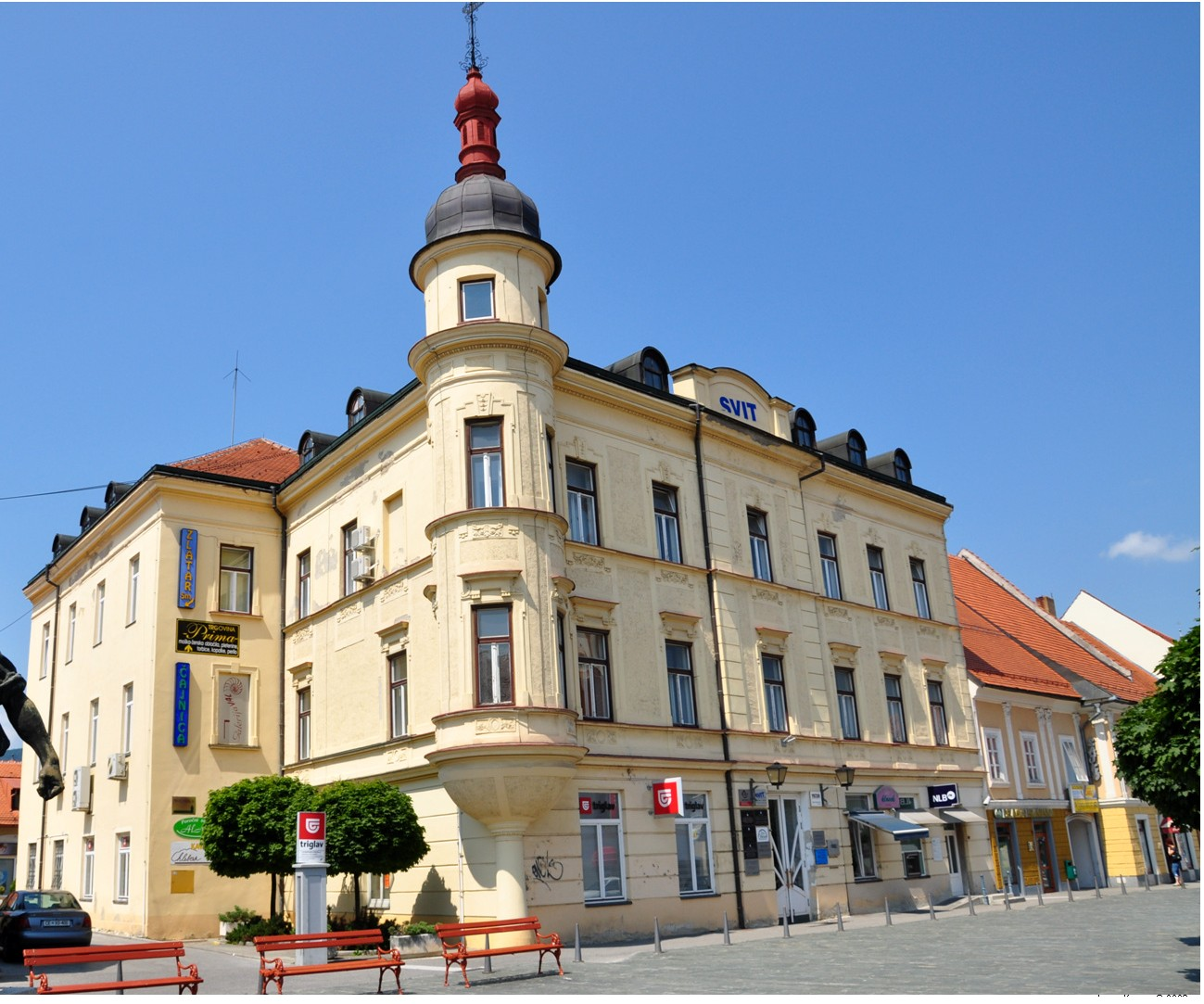
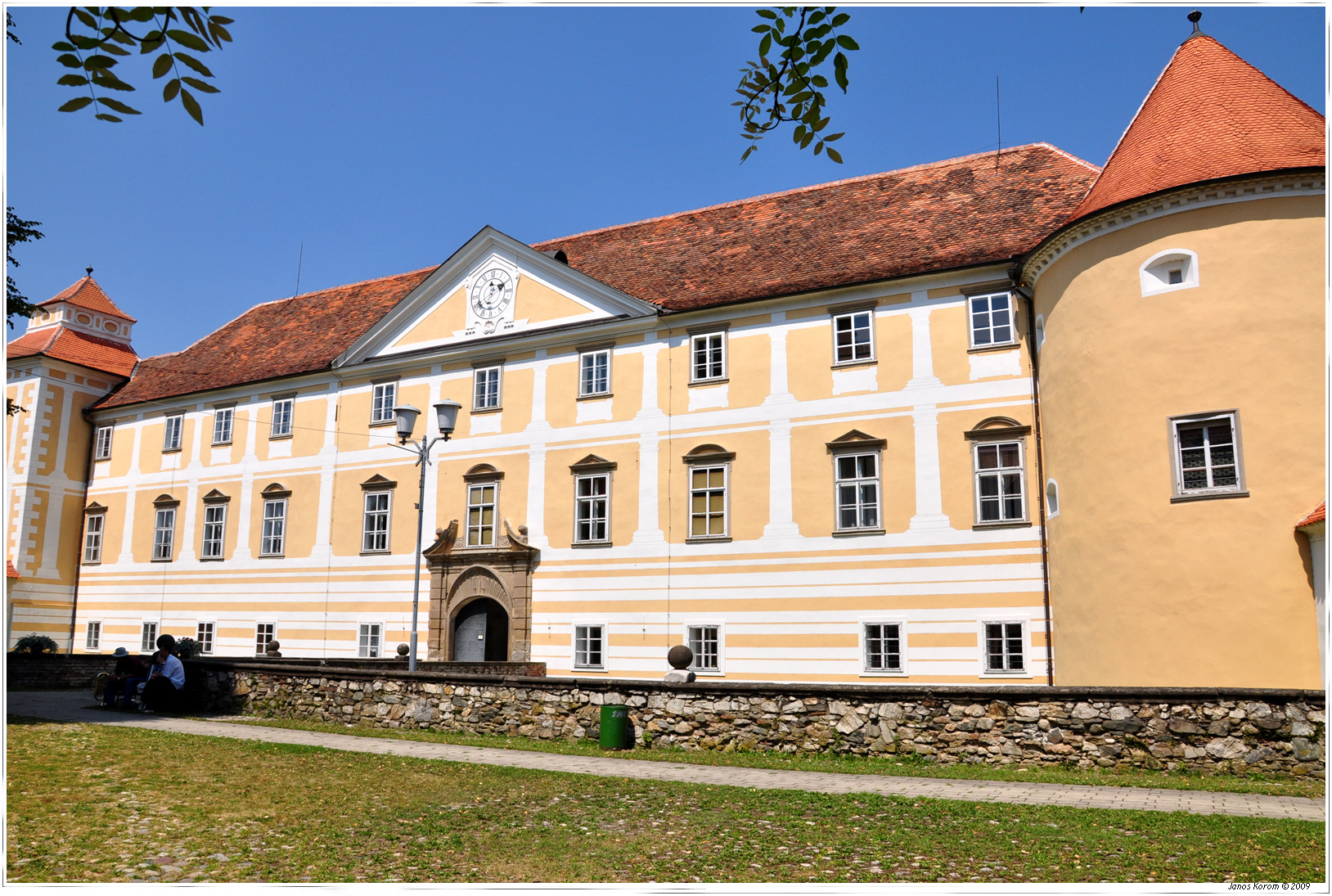
- From top, left to right: Bridge over Bistrica river into town, Town Manor, St. Joseph's Church, Town Center House, Former Hotel, Bistrica Castle

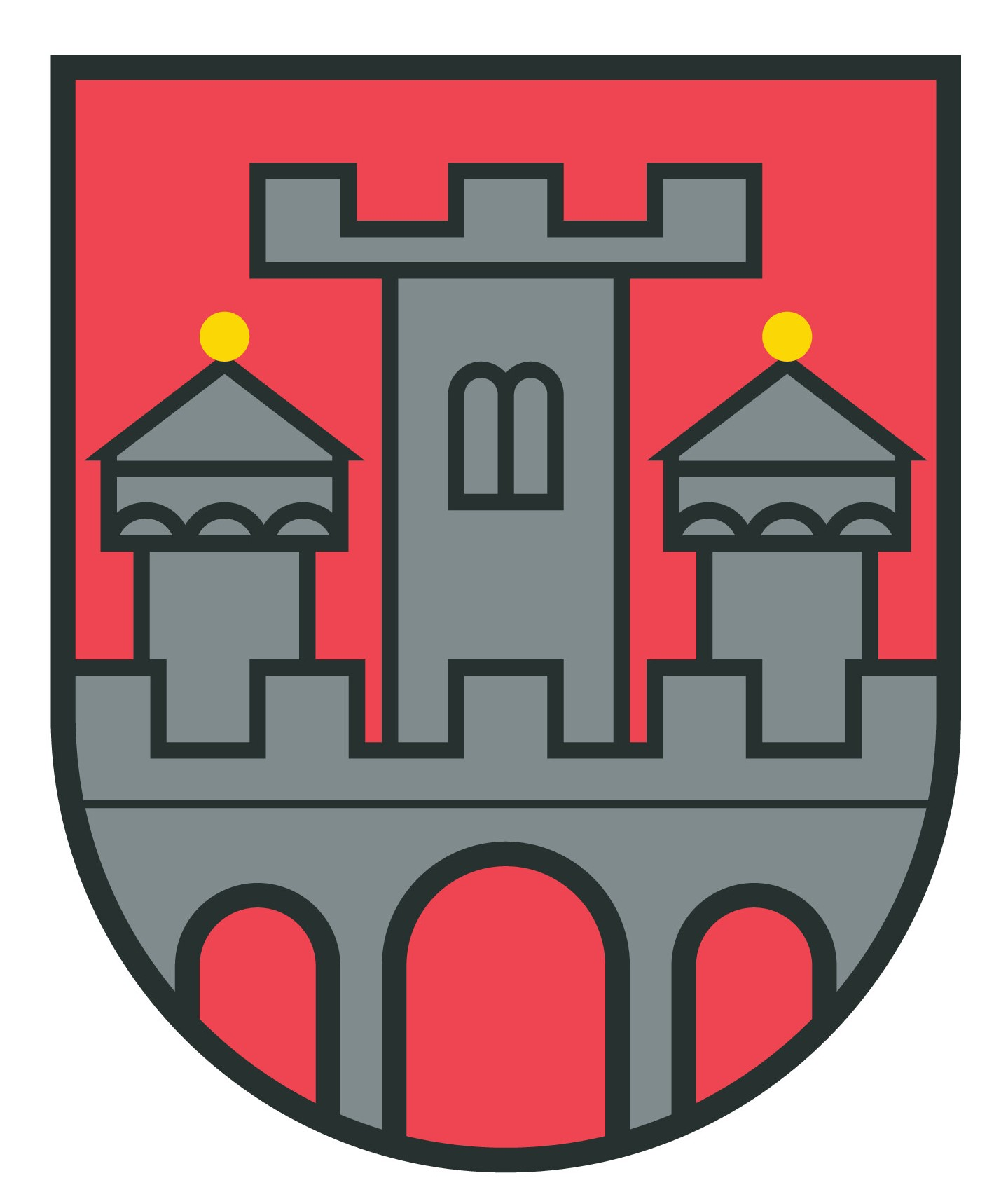
- Coat of arms

- Location in Slovenia
- Coordinates: 46°23′25″N 15°34′30″E
- Country: Slovenia
- Traditional region: Styria
- Statistical region: Drava
- Municipality: Slovenska Bistrica

Government
  - Mayor: Ivan Žagar (SLS)

Area
  - Total: 7.97 km^{2} (3.08 sq mi)
- Elevation: 274.9 m (902 ft)

Population (2019)
  - Total: 8,118
  - Density: 1,020/km^{2} (2,640/sq mi)
- Time zone: UTC+1 (CET)
  - Summer (DST): UTC+2 (CEST)
- Postal code: 2310
- Area code: 02 (+386 2 if calling from abroad)
- Vehicle registration: MB
- Website: https://www.slovenska-bistrica.si/

Slovenska Bistrica (pronounced [slɔˈʋèːnska ˈbíːstɾitsa]; German: Windisch-Feistritz) is a town south of Maribor in eastern Slovenia. It is the seat of the Municipality of Slovenska Bistrica, one of the largest municipalities in Slovenia. The area is part of the traditional region of Styria. The town is included in the Drava Statistical Region. Together with neighboring Slovenske Konjice they form a regional centre of the Upper Dravinja valley and southern Pohorje, sometimes referred to as the Dravinja region (Dravinjska).

== History ==
The town was established in the 13th century on the trade road between Maribor and Celje, and was granted market rights in 1313. It was originally called just "Bistrica", a common toponym for rapid-flowing streams and rivers in South Slavic languages; the present name of Slovenska Bistrica (German: Windisch-Feistritz) first appears in records dating from 1565.

Before 1918, the town had a German-speaking majority (in the last Austrian census of 1910, 57.7% of the inhabitants declared German as their language of daily communication), while the surrounding countryside was almost exclusively Slovene-speaking.

== Demographics ==
The town has a population of 8,016 (in 2018). Many locals commute to Maribor for work, less than an hour's drive away.

Historical population
Year	Pop.	±%
1948	2,261	—
1953	2,570	+13.7%
1961	2,694	+4.8%
1971	2,974	+10.4%
1981	6,320	+112.5%
1991	6,711	+6.2%
2002	6,591	−1.8%
2011	7,454	+13.1%
2021	8,252	+10.7%
Population size may be affected by changes in administrative divisions.

== Landmarks ==
The town offers several interesting sights, including Bistrica Castle, churches, a Roman road, and the Ancient Roman fort of Ančnik. It serves as a starting point for hiking excursions to nearby Mount Boč.

=== Parish church ===
The parish church in the settlement is dedicated to Saint Bartholomew (Slovene: sveti Jernej) and belongs to the Roman Catholic Archdiocese of Maribor. It is first mentioned in written documents dating to 1240, but was greatly rebuilt and extended in the Baroque style in the 18th century. The belfry dates to the 19th century. Two other larger churches in the town are dedicated to Our Lady of the Seven Sorrows and Saint Joseph. They date to the 15th and 18th centuries.

== Notable people ==
Notable people that were born or lived in Slovenska Bistrica include the following:

- Herta Haas (1914–2010), one of the wives of Josip Broz Tito
- Urška Žigart (born 1996), professional cyclist
- Kaja Korošec (born 2001), international footballer
- Zora Janžekovič (1918–2015), surgeon
